= List of ship launches in 1809 =

The list of ship launches in 1809 includes a chronological list of some ships launched in 1809.

Date	Ship	Class	Builder	Location	Country	Notes
3 January	Rhodian	Sloop-of-war	Robert Guillaume	Northam	United Kingdom	For Royal Navy.
6 January	Venus	West Indiaman	Caleb Smith & Co.	Lancaster	United Kingdom	For private owner.
January	Friends	Brig		Liverpool	United Kingdom	For Dawson, Humble & Co.
January	Iphigénie	Privateer		Bayonne	France	For private owner.
1 February	Sarpedon	Cherokee-class brig-sloop	John Warwick	Eling	United Kingdom	For Royal Navy.
12 February	Basque	Curieux-class brig	Jean Baudry	Bayonne	France	For French Navy.
16 February	Beaver	Cherokee-class brig-sloop	Jabez Bailey	Ipswich	United Kingdom	For Royal Navy.
18 February	Arachne	Cruizer-class brig-sloop	Thomas Hills	Sandwich	United Kingdom	For Royal Navy.
28 February	Marinham	Merchantman	T. & J. Brocklebank	Whitehaven	United Kingdom	For private owner.
February	Aimable Joséphine	Privateer	Louis & Mathurin Crucy	Nantes	France	For private owner.
February	La Patrie	Merchantman			France	For private owner.
3 March	Royal Transit	Merchantman		Ipswich	United Kingdom	For private owner.
3 March	San Domingo	Courageux-class ship of the line	Edward Sison	Woolwich Dockyard	United Kingdom	For Royal Navy.
4 March	Nereus	Fifth rate	Simon Temple	Jarrow	United Kingdom	For Royal Navy.
4 March	Royal Oak	Fame-class ship of the line	John Dudman	Deptford	United Kingdom	For Royal Navy.
6 March	Malacca	Apollo-class frigate		Prince of Wales Island, Penang	India<--Penang was part of India at the time-->	For Royal Navy.
24 March	Mouche No. 20	Mouche No. 2-class schooner-aviso		Toulon	France	For French Navy.
24 March	Mouche No. 21	Mouche No. 2-class schooner-aviso		Toulon	France	For French Navy.
31 March	Triomphant	Téméraire-class ship of the line		Rochefort	France	For French Navy.
1 April	Milford	Third rate	Philemon Jacobs	Milford Haven	United Kingdom	For Royal Navy.
4 April	Aid	Aid-class storeship	Thomas Brindley	King's Lynn	United Kingdom	For Royal Navy.
8 April	Lady Carrington	Merchantman	Hilhouse	Bristol	United Kingdom	For Messrs. Anderson & Swan.
18 April	Néréide	Piémontaise-class frigate		Saint-Malo	France	For French Navy.
April	Bacchus	Brig		Liverpool	United Kingdom	For Morrall & Borland.
April	Lydia	Full-rigged ship	Hall, Buchan & Co.	Aberdeen	United Kingdom	For private owner.
1 May	Astrée	Pallas-class frigate	Jean Michel Segondat	Cherbourg	France	For French Navy.
2 May	Ajax	Vengeur-class ship of the line	Perry	Blackwall Yard	United Kingdom	For Royal Navy.
2 May	Persian	Cruizer-class brig-sloop	Daniel List	Cowes	United Kingdom	For Royal Navy.
4 May	Abo	Corvette	D. V. Kuznetsov	Nicolaev	Russia	For Imperial Russian Navy.
9 May	Ne Tron Menia	Selafail-class ship of the line	A. M. Kurochkin	Arkhangelsk	Russia	For Imperial Russian Navy.
9 May	Pobedonosets	Third rate	A. M. Kurochkin	Arkhangelsk	Russia	For Imperial Russian Navy.
9 May	Trekh Ierarkhov	Selafail-class ship of the line	A. M. Kurochkin	Arkhangelsk	Russia	For Imperial Russian Navy.
10 May	Vsevolod	Vsevolod-class ship of the line	A. M. Kurochkin	location	Russia	For Imperial Russian Navy.
19 May	Saratov	Vsevolod-class ship of the line	A. M. Kurochkin	location	Russia	For Imperial Russian Navy.
25 May	Ulm	Téméraire-class ship of the line		Toulon	France	For French Navy.
29 May	Castilan	Cruizer-class brig-sloop	Thomas Hills	Sandgate	United Kingdom	For Royal Navy.
30 May	Hecate	Cruizer-class brig-sloop	John King	Upnor	United Kingdom	For Royal Navy.
May	Martin	Bermuda-class sloop	David McCallan	Bermuda	(United Kingdom of Great Britain and Ireland) Bermuda	For Royal Navy.
2 June	Endeavour	Boat		Bowness-on-Windermere	United Kingdom	For John Wilson.
20 June	Bulmer	Transport ship	Smith	Newcastle upon Tyne	United Kingdom	For private owner.
29 June	John of Gaunt	West Indiaman	Brocklebank	Whitehaven	United Kingdom	For private owner.
29 June	Scylla	Cruizer-class brig-sloop	Robert Davy	Topsham	United Kingdom	For Royal Navy.
June	Hopewell	Sloop		Borrowstoneness	United Kingdom	For private owner.
June	Leeds	Merchantman		Bridlington	United Kingdom	For private owner.
1 July	Echo	Cruizer-class brig-sloop	John Pelham	Frindsbury	United Kingdom	For Royal Navy.
3 July	Hesper	Cormorant-class ship-sloop	Benjamin Tanner & John Crook	Dartmouth	United Kingdom	For Royal Navy.
15 July	Mouche No. 22	Mouche No. 2-class schooner-aviso	François Peste	Genoa	Kingdom of Italy	For French Navy.
15 July	Partridge	Cormorant-class ship-sloop	John Avery	Dartmouth	United Kingdom	For Royal Navy.
15 July	Thracian	Cruizer-class brig-sloop	Josiah & Thomas Brindley	Frindsbury	United Kingdom	For Royal Navy.
15 July	Trinculo	Cruizer-class brig-sloop	Scott Blake	Bursledon	United Kingdom	For Royal Navy.
29 July	Welton	Merchantman	W. Gibson	Hull	United Kingdom	For T. Barkworth & Co.
July	Royal George	Sloop-of-war	John Dennis	Kingston Royal Naval Dockyard	(United Kingdom of Great Britain and Ireland) Upper Canada	For Provincial Marine.
2 August	Mouche No. 23	Mouche No. 2-class schooner-aviso		Bayonne	France	For French Navy.
12 August	Mouche No. 24	Mouche No. 2-class schooner-aviso	Jean Baudry	Bayonne	France	For French Navy.
12 August	Orpheus	Apollo-class frigate	Robert John Nelson	Deptford Dockyard	United Kingdom	For Royal Navy.
12 August	Rifleman	Cruizer-class brig-sloop	John King	Upnor	United Kingdom	For Royal Navy.
14 August	Sviatoslav	Selafail-class ship of the line	A. M. Kurochkin	Arkhangelsk	Russia	For Imperial Russian Navy.
15 August	Adrienne	Pallas-class frigate	François-Frédéric Poncet	Toulon	France	For French Navy.
28 August	Charybdis	Cruizer-class brig-sloop	John Davidson & Mark Richards	Hythe	United Kingdom	For Royal Navy.
29 August	Mouche No. 26	Mouche No. 2-class schooner-aviso		Bayonne	France	For French Navy.
30 August	Girafe	Var-class storeship		La Ciotat	France	For French Navy.
8 September	Sophie	Cruizer-class brig-sloop	John Pelham	Frindsbury	United Kingdom	For Royal Navy.
11 September	Berwick	Vengeur-class ship of the line	John Perry	Blackwall	United Kingdom	For Royal Navy.
12 September	Manilla	Man-of-war	Edward Sison	Woolwich	United Kingdom	For Royal Navy.
18 September	Sveaborg	Fifth rate	I. V. Kurepanov	Saint Petersburg	Russia	For Imperial Russian Navy.
20 September	Archduke Charles	Merchantman	Simon Temple	Jarrow	United Kingdom	For S. Temple & M. Lindsay.
23 September	Curacoa	Apollo-class frigate	Robert Guillaume	Northfleet	United Kingdom	For Royal Navy.
24 September	Zephyr	Crocus-class brig-sloop	Nicholas Diddams	Portsmouth Dockyard	United Kingdom	For Royal Navy.
25 September	Alpha	Merchantman	Alexander Sime & Co.	Leith	United Kingdom	For private owner.
27 September	Crane	Cruizer-class brig-sloop	Josiah & Thomas Brindley	Frindsbury	United Kingdom	For Royal Navy.
September	Persanne	Var-class transport ship	Chicallat & Jouvin	Marseille	France	For French Navy.
September	Venus	Merchantman	James MacRae	Chittagong	India	For private owner.
14 October	John Campbell	Full-rigged ship	John Scot & Sons	Glasgow	United Kingdom	For John Campbell Sr. & Co.
20 October	Mouche No. 27	Mouche No. 2-class schooner-aviso		Bayonne	France	For French Navy.
24 October	Earl of Chester	Merchantman		Chester	United Kingdom	For Clarke & Tods.
25 October	Muros	Crocus-class brig-sloop	Robert Seppings	Chatham Dockyard	United Kingdom	For Royal Navy.
October	The Jubilee	Merchantman	John Foster	Selby	United Kingdom	For private owner.
8 November	Trelawney	West Indiaman	John Barrey	Whitby	United Kingdom	For private owner.
9 November	Arcade	Merchantman	Pearson, Collinson & Co	Thorne	United Kingdom	For Messrs Moxons.
9 November	Leda	Apollo-class frigate	Edward Sison	Woolwich Dockyard	United Kingdom	For Royal Navy.
9 November	Mountaineer	Merchantman	Smales & Co.	Whitby	United Kingdom	For James Arry.
9 November	Prospero	Crocus-class brig-sloop	Edward Sison	Woolwich Dockyard	United Kingdom	For Royal Navy.
9 November	Trent	Merchantman	John Smith	Gainsborough	United Kingdom	For private owner.
21 November	Christopher	West Indiaman	Brockbank	Lancaster	United Kingdom	For Bradshaw & Co.
21 November	Coquette	Diligente-class corvette			France	For French Navy.
24 November	Hebe	West Indiaman	Thomas Steemson	Paull	United Kingdom	For Mr. Staniforth.
November	Mouche No. 28	Mouche No. 2-class schooner-aviso		Bayonne	France	For French Navy.
8 December	Golymin	Téméraire-class ship of the line	Caudan	Lorient	France	For French Navy.
8 December	Rodney	Vengeur-class ship of the line	Frances Barnard	Deptford	United Kingdom	For Royal Navy.
8 December	Saldanha	Apollo-class frigate	Temple	South Shields	United Kingdom	For Royal Navy.
9 December	Astell	East Indiaman	Peter Everitt Mestaer	Rotherhithe	United Kingdom	For British East India Company.
9 December	Poictiers	Vengeur-class ship of the line	John King	Upnor	United Kingdom	For Royal Navy.
20 December	Jalouse	Cormorant-class ship-sloop	Joseph Tucker	Plymouth Dockyard	United Kingdom	For Royal Navy.
22 December	Theban	Apollo-class frigate	George Parsons	Warsash	United Kingdom	For Royal Navy.
23 December	Belvidera	Apollo-class frigate	Robert John Nelson	Deptford Dockyard	United Kingdom	For Royal Navy.
December	Fidèle	Pallas-class frigate		Vlissingen	(Netherlands) Kingdom of Holland	For French Navy.
Unknown date	Accommodation	Paddle steamer	John Jackson & John Bruce	Montreal	(United Kingdom of Great Britain and Ireland) Lower Canada	For John Molson.
Unknown date	Achilles	Merchantman			United States	For private owner.
Unknown date	Ann	Merchantman	John & Philip Laing	Sunderland	United Kingdom	For Mr. Covey.
Unknown date	Ariel	Brig		Bombay	India	For British East India Company.
Unknown date	Aurora	Sloop	Bombay Dockyard	Bombay	India	For Bombay Marine.
Unknown date	Balfour	Barque	T. & J. Brocklebank	Whitehaven	United Kingdom	For Thomas & John Brocklebank.
Unknown date	Bombay	Merchantman		Bombay	India	For private owner.
Unknown date	Bona	Privateer			United States	For George J. Brown, John Gooding, William T. Graham, John Hollins, Charles Kalkman, Michael McBlair and James Williams.
Unknown date	Bramble	Shamrock-class schooner	Dell	Bermuda	(United Kingdom of Great Britain and Ireland) Bermuda	For Royal Navy.
Unknown date	British Hero	Transport ship	Simon Temple	Jarrow	United Kingdom	For British government.
Unknown date	Charles Grant	East Indiaman		Bombay	India	For British East India Company.
Unknown date	Diana	Schooner		Oswego, New York	United States	For Matthew McNair.
Unknown date	Elizabeth	West Indiaman	William James, Brice & Co.	Wapping	United Kingdom	For Robert Claxton & Sons.
Unknown date	Elizabeth	Merchantman	Buckle & Davies	Chepstow	United Kingdom	For Lowbridge and Richard Bright.
Unknown date	Ferret	Cutter	Josiah Fox	Norfolk Navy Yard, Norfolk, Virginia	United States	For United States Navy.
Unknown date	Ganges	Whaler		Haverhill, Massachusetts	United States	For private owner.
Unknown date	Hebe	Merchantman			United Kingdom	For Mr. Cheesewright.
Unknown date	Holly	Shamrock-class schooner	Nathaniel Tynes	Bermuda	(United Kingdom of Great Britain and Ireland) Bermuda	For Royal Navy.
Unknown date	John	west Indiaman		Chester	United Kingdom	For Hind & Co.
Unknown date	John O'Gaunt	Merchantman	John Brockbank	Lancaster	United Kingdom	For Worswick & Co.
Unknown date	John Tobin	Merchantman		Hull	United Kingdom	For Tobin & Co.
Unknown date	Le Fantôme	Privateer			France	For private owner.
Unknown date	Juniper	Shamrock-class schooner		Bermuda	(United Kingdom of Great Britain and Ireland) Bermuda	For Royal Navy.
Unknown date	Lord Wellington	Merchantman	R & J Bulmer	South Shields	United Kingdom	For Bulmer & Co.
Unknown date	Mariner	Merchantman		Philadelphia, Pennsylvania	United States	For private owner.
Unknown date	Mistletoe	Shamrock-class schooner	Hill	Bermuda	(United Kingdom of Great Britain and Ireland) Bermuda	For Royal Navy.
Unknown date	Monmouth	Barque	Laing & Co.	South Shields	United Kingdom	For private owner.
Unknown	Mouche No. 25	Mouche No. 2-class schooner-aviso		Bayonne	France	For French Navy.
Unknown date	Myrtle	Brigantine			United Kingdom	For private owner.
Unknown date	Nimrod	Merchantman		Montreal	(United Kingdom of Great Britain and Ireland) Upper Canada	For private owner.
Unknown date	Oneida	Brig	Christian Bergh & Henry Eckford	Oswego, New York	United States	For United States Navy.
Unknown date	Orange	Gunboat		Halifax	(United Kingdom of Great Britain and Ireland) Upper Canada	For Royal Navy.
Unknown date	Phénix	Privateer		Bordeaux	France	For private owner.
Unknown date	Ramoncita	Merchantman		South Shields	United Kingdom	For private owner.
Unknown date	Rosina	Brig	Hylton Ferry Co.	Sunderland	United Kingdom	For private owner.
Unknown date	Sappho	Full-rigged ship	John & Philip Laing	Sunderland	United Kingdom	For Sir F. Baring.
Unknown date	Tranby	Brig		Sunderland	United Kingdom	For Mr. Clarkson.
Unknown date	Trelawney	West Indiaman		Whitby	United Kingdom	For private owner.
Unknown date	Vautour	Sylphe-class brig		Vlissingen	France	For Royal Navy.
Unknown date	Vestal	Brig		Bombay Dockyard	India	For Bombay Marine.
Unknown date	Wasp	Brig		Hull	United Kingdom	For private owner.
Unknown date	William Rathbone	West Indiaman		Liverpool	United Kingdom	For Tobin & Co.
Unknown date	Yestal	Brig		Bombay	India	For British East India Company.
Unknown date	Name unknown	Merchantman		Boston, Massachusetts	United States	For private owner.
Unknown date	Name unknown	Merchantman		Boston, Massachusetts	United States	For private owner.
Unknown date	Name unknown	Merchantman			France	For private owner.
