= HMS Holly =

Two vessels of the Royal Navy have borne the name Holly:

- HMS Holly (1809) was a Shamrock-class schooner launched in Bermuda. She participated in the capture of San Sebastián in 1813, a campaign that resulted in the Admiralty awarding her crew the Naval General Service Medal. She was wrecked in January 1814.
- HMT Holly (T–19) was the trawler Kingston Coral that Cook, Welton & Gemmill, Beverley launched on 17 April 1930. The Royal Navy purchased her in November 1935 for use as a minesweeper and renamed her Holly. She was sold in 1947 and became the Norwegian trawler Dragaberg, which was wrecked off Faeringehavn, Greenland on 28 July 1961.
