= Thracia pubescens =

Scientific classification
- Kingdom: Animalia
- Phylum: Mollusca
- Class: Bivalvia
- Superfamily: Thracioidea
- Family: Thraciidae
- Genus: Thracia
- Species: T. pubescens

Binomial name
- Thracia pubescens (Pulteney, 1799)

Synonyms
- Anatina myalis Lamarck, 1818; Mya pubescens Pulteney, 1799; Thracia myalis J.B.P.A. Lamarck, 1818

Species of bivalve

Thracia pubescens is a bivalve mollusc in the family Thraciidae.

== Description ==
The ovate shell is oblong, transverse, equilateral, inequivalve and slightly inflated. it is of a reddish white color, covered with a browner shagreened epidermis, and marked with irregular and more or less numerous striae of increase. The beaks are short, and that of the right valve is notched at its summit to receive that of the left valve. The valves are pretty thick, rounded at the anterior, and truncated at the posterior side. The same side is separated from the upper surface by an obtuse angle, which arises from the posterior extremity of the beaks, and which descends obliquely as far as the lower extremity of the shell. The cardinal edge is rather thin, and destitute of teeth. It presents at the posterior side of the beaks an internal hollow, short and thick. The hollow is oblique and bounded outwardly by a little ridge, in which is inserted an external ligament, whilst another strong ligament is situated in the hollows of the valves. Interiorly they are white, smooth and polished. There exists upon the anterior side a muscular impression, long and very narrow in its middle, very near the edge. The posterior muscular impression is rounded and pretty large.

== Distribution ==
Thracia pubescens is found in the North Atlantic Ocean, off Spain, the Azores and the Canary Islands and West Africa. It is distributed widely round the coasts of Britain and Ireland where it burrows in sandy or muddy substrates, extending its siphons to the surface to breathe and feed. It is also found in the Mediterranean Sea (Greece, Italy).
