= Thracia (disambiguation) =

Thracia is the Latin name of Thrace. It may refer to:

- the (territory of the) Thracian Odrysian kingdom
- Roman Thrace
- the Roman/Byzantine Diocese of Thrace
- the Byzantine (medieval) theme of Thrace, see Thrace (theme)
- Thracia (bivalve), a bivalve genus
- Fire Emblem: Thracia 776, a game in the Fire Emblem series

== See also ==
- Thracians
- Eastern Thrace
- Western Thrace
- History of Bulgaria
