= Thracia corbuloidea =

Scientific classification
- Kingdom: Animalia
- Phylum: Mollusca
- Class: Bivalvia
- Superfamily: Thracioidea
- Family: Thraciidae
- Genus: Thracia
- Species: T. corbuloidea

Binomial name
- Thracia corbuloidea Blainville, 1827

Synonyms
- Anatina ovalis (Philippi, 1840); Thracia corbuloides Deshayes, 1830; Thracia corbuloides philippiana Nordsieck, 1969; Thracia ovalis Philippi, 1840; Thracia pholadomyoides Forbes, 1844

Species of bivalve

Thracia corbuloidea is a bivalve mollusc in the family Thraciidae.

== Authority ==
The name was introduced in Blainville's "Manuel de Malacologie et de Conchyliologie" page 565 (issued 1825), without a description but with reference to plate 76, fig. 7; it only became available when the plate was published in 1827. The same name was introduced again by Blainville (1829) in his article "Thracie" of "Dictionnaire des Sciences Naturelles" (vol. 54, p. 316) with a reference to plate 76, fig. 7 in the Atlas of "Conchyliologie et Malacologie" of the "Dictionnaire", identical to that of the "Manuel". Blainville wrote that the specimen on which the taxon is based belongs to Deshayes' collection, therefore it is presumably an objective synonym of Thracia corbuloides Deshayes, 1830.

== Description ==
The ovate shell is oblong, transverse, very inequivalve, inequilateral and very much inflated,. It ismarked with irregular lines of increase, entirely white, and covered with a grayish brown epidermis. The beaks of the valves are very large, protuberant and cordiform. The right valve, which is the larger, has its beak notched at its summit to receive the beak of the left valve. The cardinal edge is delicate. It presents upon its posterior side a nympha, which projects within the valves, and which receives a ligament partly internal and partly external. The anterior extremity of the shell is obtuse, rounded. The posterior extremity is truncated : this side is bounded outwardly by a very prominent obtuse angle, which extends obliquely from the beak to the lower part of the shell. Interiorly the valves are white. Two muscular impressions are seen, very much separated, the anterior of which is long and narrow.;The posterior is rounded. They are united by a palleal impression, deeply notched posteriorly.

== Distribution ==
Thracia corbuloidea is found in the North Atlantic Ocean, off Spain, the Azores and the Canary Islands; also off Florida. It is distributed widely round the coasts of Britain where it burrows in sandy or muddy substrates, extending its siphons to the surface to breathe and feed. It is also found in the Mediterranean Sea (Greece, Turkey).
