= Cleaver Bank =

Sandbank in the North Sea

Položaj Cleaver Banka na zemljovidu Sjevernog mora

The Cleaver Bank (Dutch: Klaverbank) is a sandbank in the North Sea about 160 kilometres (99 miles) off the west coast of the Netherlands and south of the Dogger Bank. The size of the bank is about 1235 km^{2}. The bank is 30–40 metres below sea level.

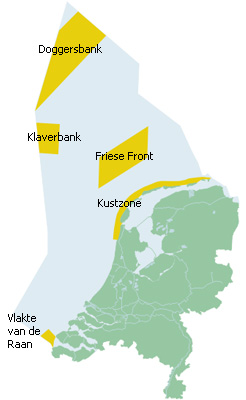
Location of the Cleaver Bank (Dutch: Klaverbank, in reference to the Dogger Bank and the Dutch coast.

The Cleaver Bank is an open-sea reef in the terms of the European Habitats directive and has been registered with the European Union as a Natura 2000 site. The bank originated as a terminal moraine of a glacier during one of the Ice Ages.

The surface of the bank partly consists of gravel and larger cobbles. Due to the relatively great depth of the Cleaver Bank, the soil is only seldom, in very heavy weather, moved by wave action. Because the gravel is relatively poor in silt and the transparency is great, there is enough light to allow for the growth of calcareous red algae. The benthic fauna on the bank contains species that live on a hard substrate, such as sea anemones and polyps. Rare species living on Cleaver Bank are Thracia convexa and the Rayed artemis. The bank is used by herring for spawning. In addition, the soft coral type dead man's finger is found here.

A 60-metre-deep channel, called the Botney Cut, runs through the Cleaver Bank. Animals like harbour porpoises, minke whales, and white-beaked dolphin live there, mainly in the summer.

== Conservation ==
In 2001, the Dutch government considered the Cleaver Bank as a potential area for mining gravel. After making an Environmental impact assessment the plan was abandoned. The Cleaver bank is in 2015 considered for protection as a Marine protected area. The Greenpeace organisation considered the actions of the Dutch government in this direction too slow and sank some large boulders on the seabed in May 2015 to increase the nature value. Dutch fishers lifted the boulders on 16 June 2015, because they were afraid the boulders would damage their fishing gear.
