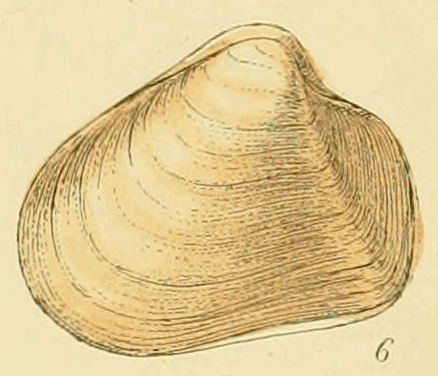
- Drawing of a shell of Thracia convexa

Scientific classification
- Kingdom: Animalia
- Phylum: Mollusca
- Class: Bivalvia
- Superorder: Anomalodesmata
- Superfamily: Thracioidea
- Family: Thraciidae
- Genus: Thracia; Blainville, 1824

Type species
- Mya pubescens Pulteney, 1799

Species
- See text

Synonyms
- Eximiothracia Iredale, 1924; Homoeodesma P. Fischer, 1887; Ixartia Leach, 1852 · accepted, alternate representation; Odoncineta O. G. Costa, 1830 · accepted, alternate representation; Osteodesma Blainville, 1827; Rupicola Fleuriau de Bellevue, 1802 (preoccupied by Rupicola Brisson, 1760 (Aves)); Thracia (Cetothrax) Iredale, 1949 · accepted, alternate representation; Thracia (Crassithracia) Soot-Ryen, 1941 · accepted, alternate representation; Thracia (Homoeodesma) P. Fischer, 1887 · accepted, alternate representation; Thracia (Ixartia) Leach in Gray, 1852 · accepted, alternate representation; Thracia (Odoncineta) O. G. Costa, 1830 · accepted, alternate representation; Thracia (Thracia) Blainville, 1824 · accepted, alternate representation

= Thracia (bivalve) =

Genus of bivalves

Thracia is a genus of bivalve mollusc in the family Thraciidae.

== Authority ==
The name is dated by Sherborn from Sowerby's "Mineral conchology of Great Britain" (1823: vol. 5 p. 20) but therein it is only a mention of a manuscript name by Leach, without a description. It is made available, with a full generic description, in Blainville's article "Mollusques" of "Dictionnaire des Sciences Naturelles" vol. 32, p. 347.

== Type species ==
The designation of the type species of Thracia is far from straightforward. The description by Blainville (1824) includes two species: his own T. corbuloidea and T. pubescens Leach. However, at that time T. corbuloidea was still a nomen nudum, and not available nomenclaturally. Also Leach did not publish the name pubescens, which is however available from Pulteney, 1799.

Later, Blainville (1827, p. 660, in the corrections and additions to his "Manuel de Malacologie") stated that Thracia pubescens should be excluded. However, ICZN article 69.4. says that "Elimination of all but one of the originally included nominal species from a nominal genus or subgenus does not in itself constitute type fixation".

The first formal fixation for this genus was by Deshayes (1830) in the entry for Thracia of "Dictionnaire classique d'histoire naturelle" vol. 16, where he wrote, "C'est de cette manière que nous avons su que cette belle espèce [Thracia pubescens] était devenue le type d'un nouveau genre du zoologiste anglais." However, Deshayes also describes Thracia pubescens as a new species, based on a specimen in the Brongniart collection with a manuscript label by Leach, which makes it separately available, homonymous and synonymous with Thracia pubescens Pulteney, also based on Leach's unpublished name.

== Description ==
The ovate shell is oblong, transverse, with unequal valves. The beaks are strongly recurved, that of the right valve notched to receive that of the opposite side. The right valve is more convex and larger than the left. The hinge has upon each valve a horizontal and narrow nympheal callosity, which sometimes expands into a spoon-shaped projection, and contains an internal ligament, which is prolonged, and slightly issues outwardly into the corselet. The shell shows two muscular impressions, the anterior depressed, elongated, contracted towards its middle, and united to the posterior, which is rounded, by a pallial impression, strongly notched at its posterior part.

The animal is oval, thick, enveloped in a very delicate mantle, diaphanous upon its sides, through which is distinctly seen the branchiae and the abdominal mass. The edges are swollen, lobed, and united in almost the whole of the circumference, so that they present only three openings. The first is found at the anterior and lower third of the median line. It forms a slit for the passage of the foot. The two others are seen at the posterior part, and give passage to two distinct tubes or tracheae, cylindrical, fleshy, approaching each other towards their origin. These two tracheae can be extended far out of the shell. The lower is larger and longer, and serves to supply the branchiae with water. The upper, which is nearer to the hinge, is shorter and straighter. It serves for excrement evacuations. At its upper and internal extremity, it has two small tubercles, formed like teats, and armed with small papillae, whose use is probably to prevent the entrance of small foreign bodies. This trachea has no communication with the lower. It is prolonged, moreover, into the interior of the cavity, where it is continued by a delicate, transparent valve, which extends even to the opening of the anus. These tracheae can be drawn into the portion of the mantle which surrounds them, the covering of which is loose, and gives this part the appearance of a vulva. It is surrounded by a tendinous, solid, and elastic ring. A similar apparatus exists for the passage of the foot.

The abdominal mass is voluminous, and is terminated by a small, oval foot, compressed, fringed in the form of a crest, and sub-anterior. The branchiae are voluminous, unequal upon the same side, and united in the whole of their length, at the upper surface. At the lower and internal surface corresponding to this part, they are divided into two, by a very distinct furrow. They are thick, long and wide, of a slightly oval form at the posterior part, and truncated obliquely at the anterior part: the lower is longer; the upper adheres at its middle part in the two anterior thirds near the union of this part with the lower; this connexion is indicated at the upper part by a slight ridge. The posterior third of the two branchiae is floating and free, and is continued as far as the entrance of the siphon. The lamellae are fine and very contiguous, undulated, and a little oblique from behind, forwards.

The mouth is small, transverse and oval. The lips are simple, and the two pairs of labial appendages are straight and elongated. The retracting muscle of the trachea of the right side has an oval form, and is continued upon the abdomen by becoming thin and uniting with the mantle. That of the left side is of an irregular, oval form, and adheres by its internal surface to a membranous, elastic fold which arises from the internal opening of the large trachea, enlarging as it continues, and terminates by a semicircle which exceeds by many lines the retractor muscle of that trachea. There, it joins the mantle. This apparatus is singular and thus remarkable. It is supposed that the animal, by contracting it, employs it to throw out the water in the cavity of the trachea with more force.

== Species ==
- Thracia adenensis Melvill, 1898
- Thracia anchoralis Kilburn, 1975
- Thracia anconensis Olsson, 1961
- Thracia angasiana E. A. Smith, 1876
- Thracia arienatoma Oliver & Holmes, 2004
- Thracia bereniceae Coan, 1990
- Thracia capensis G. B. Sowerby III, 1890
- Thracia challisiana Dall, 1915
- Thracia concinna Reeve, 1859
- Thracia condoni Dall, 1909
- Thracia conradi Couthouy, 1839
- Thracia convexa (W. Wood, 1815)
- Thracia corbuloidea Blainville, 1824
- Thracia cuneolus Reeve, 1859
- Thracia curta Conrad, 1837
- Thracia devexa G. O. Sars, 1878
- Thracia distorta (Montagu, 1808)
- Thracia gracilis Jeffreys, 1865
- Thracia hainanensis Xu, 1989
- Thracia imperfecta (Lamarck, 1818)
- Thracia itoi Habe, 1961
- Thracia kakumana (Yokoyama, 1927)
- Thracia kowiensis Turton, 1932
- Thracia koyamai (Habe, 1981)
- Thracia lincolnensis Verco, 1907
- † Thracia magna P. Marshall & R. Murdoch, 1921
- Thracia meridionalis Smith, 1885
- Thracia modesta Angas, 1868
- Thracia morrisoni R. E. Petit, 1964
- Thracia myodoroides E. A. Smith, 1885
- Thracia myopsis Møller, 1842
- Thracia phaseolina (Lamarck, 1822)
- Thracia pubescens (Pulteney, 1799)
- Thracia roumei Cosel, 1995
- Thracia salsettensis (Melvill, 1893)
- Thracia septentrionalis Jeffreys, 1872
- Thracia similis Couthouy, 1849
- Thracia speciosa Angas, 1869
- Thracia squamosa Carpenter, 1856
- Thracia stimpsoni Dall, 1886
- Thracia stutchburyi M. Huber, 2010
- Thracia trapezoides Conrad, 1849
- Thracia vegrandis Marshall and Murdoch, 1919
- Thracia villosiuscula (MacGillivray, 1827)
- Thracia vitrea (Hutton, 1873)

Species brought into synonymy

synonyms
- Thracia adamsi MacGinitie, 1959: synonym of Lampeia adamsi (MacGinitie, 1959)
- Thracia alciope Angas, 1872: synonym of Thracia imperfecta (Lamarck, 1818)
- Thracia anatinoides Reeve, 1859: synonym of Thracidentula anatinoides (Reeve, 1859)
- Thracia antarctica Melvill & Standen, 1898: synonym of Laternula elliptica (King, 1832)
- Thracia australica (Reeve, 1859): synonym of Hunkydora australica (Reeve, 1859)
- Thracia beaniana Récluz, 1845: synonym of Thracia phaseolina (Lamarck, 1818)
- Thracia beringi Dall, 1915: synonym of Thracia myopsis Møller, 1842
- Thracia brazieri G. B. Sowerby III, 1884: synonym of Thracia modesta Angas, 1868
- Thracia brevirostra Brown, 1844: synonym of Cuspidaria cuspidata (Olivi, 1792)
- Thracia brevis Deshayes, 1846: synonym of Thracia distorta (Montagu, 1803)
- Thracia carnea Mörch, 1860: synonym of Macoma siliqua (C. B. Adams, 1852)
- Thracia casani Aradas & Calcara, 1843: synonym of Thracia distorta (Montagu, 1803)
- Thracia colpoica Dall, 1915: synonym of Skoglundia colpoica (Dall, 1915)
- Thracia concentrica Récluz, 1853: synonym of Thracia distorta (Montagu, 1803)
- Thracia concinna Gould, 1861: synonym of Thracia concinna Reeve, 1859
- Thracia corbuloides Deshayes, 1830: synonym of Thracia corbuloidea Blainville, 1827
- Thracia couthouyi Stimpson, 1851: synonym of Thracia myopsis Møller, 1842
- Thracia crassa Becher, 1886: synonym of Thracia septentrionalis Jeffreys, 1872
- Thracia dalli Mansfield, 1929: synonym of Cyathodonta rugosa (Lamarck, 1818)
- Thracia declivis (Pennant, 1777) sensu Conrad, 1832: synonym of Thracia conradi Couthouy, 1839
- Thracia diegensis Dall, 1915: synonym of Asthenothaerus diegensis (Dall, 1915)
- Thracia dissimilis Guppy, 1869: synonym of Cyathodonta rugosa (Lamarck, 1818)
- Thracia durouchouxi Dautzenberg & H. Fischer, 1897: synonym of Thracia villosiuscula (MacGillivray, 1827)
- Thracia elongata Philippi, 1844: synonym of Tellimya ferruginosa (Montagu, 1808)
- Thracia fabula Philippi, 1844: synonym of Thracia distorta (Montagu, 1803)
- Thracia granulosa Adams & Reeve, 1850: synonym of Cyathodonta granulosa (Adams & Reeve, 1850)
- Thracia granulosa Hutton, 1873: synonym of Parilimya neozelanica (Suter, 1914)
- Thracia hiatelloides Brusina, 1886: synonym of Thracia distorta (Montagu, 1803)
- Thracia inequale C. B. Adams, 1842: synonym of Periploma inequale (C. B. Adams, 1842)
- Thracia jacksonensis G. B. Sowerby III, 1883: synonym of Thracia modesta Angas, 1868
- Thracia jacksoniana Smith, 1876: synonym of Thracia angasiana E. A. Smith, 1876
- Thracia kamayasikensis Hatai, 1940: synonym of Thracia trapezoides Conrad, 1849
- Thracia kanakoffi Hertlein & Grant, 1972: synonym of Thracia trapezoides Conrad, 1849
- Thracia kurosawaensis Hayasaka, 1957: synonym of Thracia trapezoides Conrad, 1849
- Thracia magnifica Jonas, 1850: synonym of Cyathodonta rugosa (Lamarck, 1818)
- Thracia maravignae Aradas & Calcara, 1843: synonym of Thracia convexa (W. Wood, 1815)
- Thracia mitella Gregorio, 1884: synonym of Thracia phaseolina (Lamarck, 1818)
- Thracia neozelanica Suter, 1914: synonym of Parilimya neozelanica (Suter, 1914)
- Thracia nitida A. E. Verrill, 1884: synonym of Cetoconcha bulla (Dall, 1881)
- Thracia nomurai Yamamoto & Habe, 1959: synonym of Trigonothracia pusilla (Gould, 1861)
- Thracia novozelandica Reeve, 1859: synonym of Hunkydora novozelandica (Reeve, 1859)
- Thracia oblonga Reeve, 1859: synonym of Thracia imperfecta (Lamarck, 1818)
- Thracia ovalis Philippi, 1840: synonym of Thracia corbuloidea Blainville, 1827
- Thracia ovata Brown, 1844: synonym of Thracia villosiuscula (MacGillivray, 1827)
- Thracia papyracea (Poli, 1791): synonym of Thracia phaseolina (Lamarck, 1818)
- Thracia papyracia: synonym of Thracia papyracea (Poli, 1791): synonym of Thracia phaseolina (Lamarck, 1818)
- Thracia pholadomyoides Forbes, 1844: synonym of Thracia corbuloides Deshayes, 1830: synonym of Thracia corbuloidea Blainville, 1827
- Thracia plicata Deshayes, 1832: synonym of Cyathodonta plicata (Deshayes, 1832)
- Thracia praetenuis: synonym of Cochlodesma praetenue (Pulteney, 1799)
- Thracia pusilla Gould, 1861: synonym of Trigonothracia pusilla (Gould, 1861)
- Thracia quentinensis Dall, 1921: synonym of Thracia curta Conrad, 1837
- Thracia rectangularis Soot-Ryen, 1941: synonym of Thracia gracilis Jeffreys, 1865
- Thracia reinga Crozier, 1966: synonym of Tellimya reinga (Crozier, 1966)
- Thracia rudis Reeve, 1859: synonym of Pelopina rudis (Reeve, 1859)
- Thracia rugosa d'Orbigny, 1846: synonym of Thracia similis Couthouy, 1839
- Thracia rushii Pilsbry, 1897: synonym of Asthenothaerus rushii (Pilsbry, 1897)
- Thracia scheepmakeri Dunker, 1852: synonym of Thracia convexa (W. Wood, 1815)
- Thracia sematana Yokoyama, 1922: synonym of Parvithracia sematana (Yokoyama, 1922)
- Thracia seminuda Scarlato, 1981: synonym of Thracia septentrionalis Jeffreys, 1872
- Thracia semirugosa Reeve, 1859: synonym of Cyathodonta rugosa (Lamarck, 1818)
- Thracia tenera Jeffreys, 1880: synonym of Cochlodesma tenerum Fischer, 1882
- Thracia tetragona Jonas, 1839: synonym of Periploma margaritaceum (Lamarck, 1801)
- Thracia transenna Suter, 1913: synonym of Hunkydora novozelandica (Reeve, 1859)
- Thracia transmontana Yokoyama, 1922: synonym of Myadoropsis transmontana (Yokoyama, 1922)
- Thracia trigona Aradas, 1847: synonym of Thracia convexa (W. Wood, 1815)
- Thracia trigonalis Adams & Reeve, 1850: synonym of Leptomya trigonalis (Adams & Reeve, 1850)
- Thracia truncata Mighels & C. B. Adams, 1842: synonym of Thracia septentrionalis Jeffreys, 1872
- Thracia turtoniana Récluz, 1845: synonym of Thracia distorta (Montagu, 1803)
- Thracia ventricosa Philippi, 1844: synonym of Thracia convexa (W. Wood, 1815)
- Thracia watsoni E. A. Smith, 1885: synonym of Phragmorisma watsoni (E. A. Smith, 1885)
