= Thracia phaseolina =

Scientific classification
- Kingdom: Animalia
- Phylum: Mollusca
- Class: Bivalvia
- Superfamily: Thracioidea
- Family: Thraciidae
- Genus: Thracia
- Species: T. phaseolina

Binomial name
- Thracia phaseolina (Lamarck, 1818)

Synonyms
- Amphidesma phaseolina Lamarck, 1818 (original combination); Peronaea textilis O. G. Costa, 1830; Tellimya fontemaggii Conti, 1864; Tellina papyracea Poli, 1791 (invalid: published in December 1791 and thus a junior homonym of Tellina papyracea Gmelin, 1791 [before May]); Thracia beaniana Récluz, 1845; Thracia mitella Gregorio, 1884; Thracia papyracea (Poli, 1791); Thracia papyracia (misspelling)

Species of bivalve

Thracia phaseolina is a bivalve mollusc in the family Thraciidae.

== Description ==
The ovate shell is oblong, transverse, equilateral and inequivalve. The beaks are small; that of the left, slightly notched. The valves are white, diaphanous and smooth, indistinctly marked with striae of increase, rounded at the anterior side, strongly truncated at the posterior side. The side is bounded outwardly by an obtuse angle, pretty prominent, extending obliquely from the beak to the lower part of the shell. The cardinal edge is thin, and without teeth. It presents upon the posterior side the beaks with a small, internal, short, triangular hollow, in which is attached a small internal ligament which is apparent externally. The valves are white and shining, internally. The anterior muscular impression is elongated, the posterior is rounded, and is united to the anterior by a pallial impression, deeply notched.

Right and left valve of the same specimen:

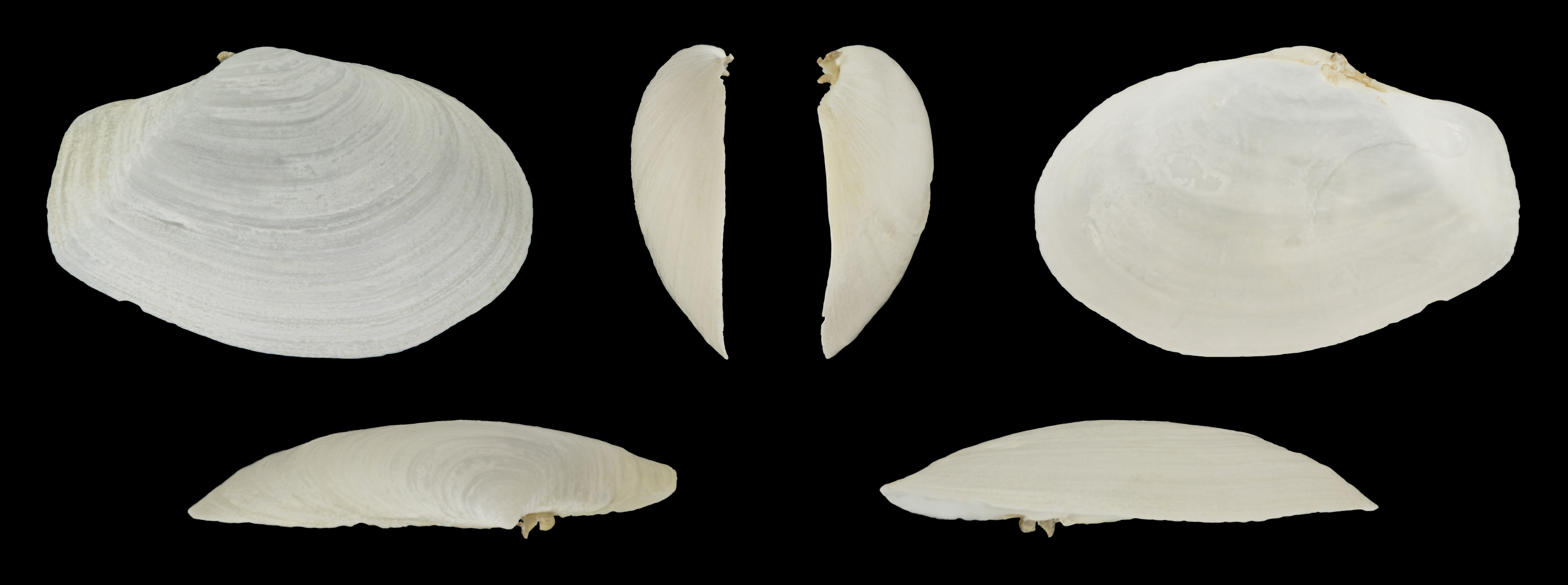
Right valve

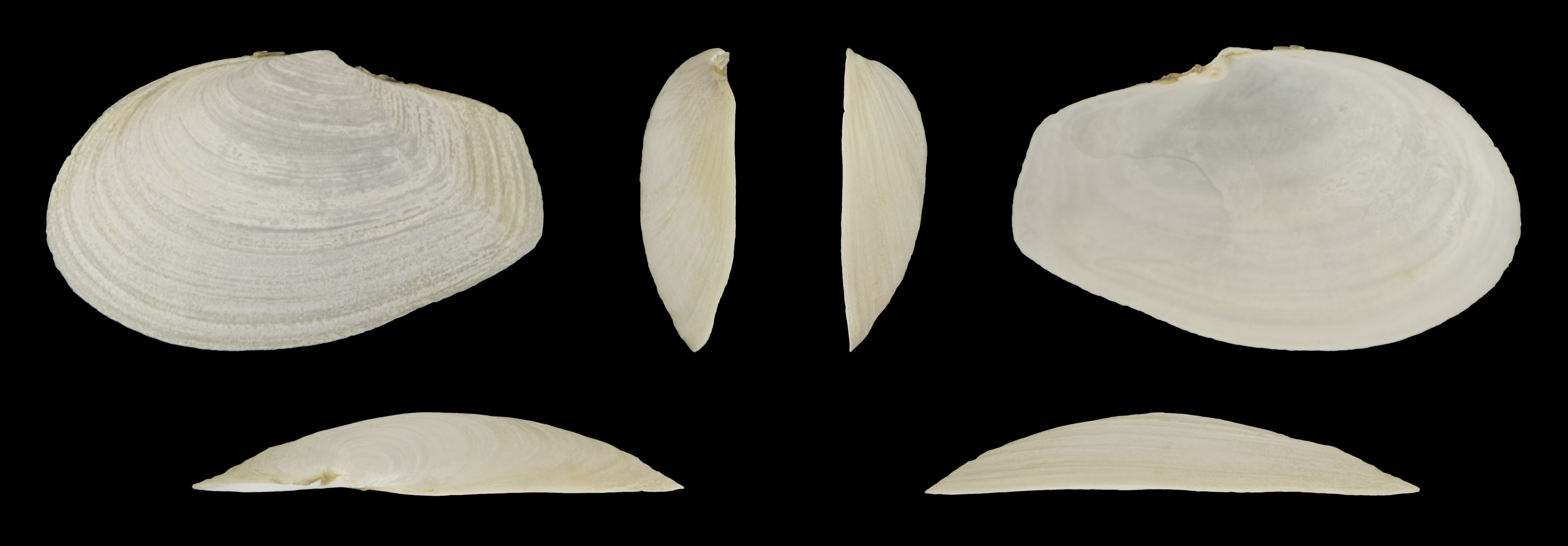
Left valve

== Distribution ==
Thracia phaseolina is found in the North Atlantic Ocean and in the North Sea. It is also found in the Mediterranean Sea and the Gulf of Mexico.
