= HMS Beagle (1804) =

Royal Navy Cruizer-class brig-sloop (1804–1813)

- Beagle

History

United Kingdom
- Name: HMS Beagle
- Namesake: The Beagle breed of dog
- Ordered: 22 May 1804
- Builder: Perry, Wells & Green, Blackwall Yard
- Laid down: June 1804
- Launched: 8 August 1804
- Completed: By 7 October 1804
- Commissioned: 1804
- Out of service: 1813
- Honours and awards: Naval General Service Medal clasps: "Basque Roads 1809"; "St. Sebastian"
- Fate: Sold on 21 July 1814

General characteristics
- Class & type: 18-gun Cruizer-class brig-sloop
- Tons burthen: 38282/94 (bm)
- Length: 100 ft (30.5 m) (gundeck); 77 ft 3 1/4 in (23.6 m) (keel)
- Beam: 30 ft 6 1/4 in (9.3 m)
- Depth of hold: 12 ft 10 1/2 in (3.92 m)
- Sail plan: Brig rigged
- Complement: 121
- Armament: 18 guns:16 × 32-pounder carronades + 2 × 6-pounder bow guns

HMS Beagle was an 18-gun Cruizer-class brig-sloop of the Royal Navy. She was launched in 1804, during the Napoleonic Wars. She played a major role in the Battle of the Basque Roads. Beagle was laid up in ordinary in 1813 and sold in 1814.

== Career ==
Beagle was commissioned in August 1804 under Commander John Burn, who sailed her to the Mediterranean. On 5 December Burn and Beagle captured the Spanish ship Fuenta Hermosa. Burn was temporarily relieved by Commander George Digby between June and August 1805, after which she joined Sir John Orde’s squadron off Cádiz.

On 14 January 1805, Beagle captured the Spanish ship Pastora Hermosa, which was carrying bullion.

Commander Francis Newcombe left the hired armed ship Lord Eldon to replace Burn in February 1806; Beagle remained in the Mediterranean until 1807. On 27 April 1806, Beagle and a number of other vessels were in company with Termagant when Termagant captured Anna Maria Carolina. Beagle then moved to the Downs where she operated between 1808 and 1809.

While under Newcombe's command Beagle captured three privateers in the English Channel. She captured Hazard, of 14 guns and 49 men, on 2 October 1808, Vengeur, of 16 guns and 48 men, on 24 January 1809, and Fortune, of 14 guns and 58 men, on 18 February.

- Hazard, which was under the command of Joseph Marie Lelong, had one man badly wounded before Beagle was able to capture her after a three-hour chase. Hazard had left Dieppe the day before and had captured two light colliers (the Trinity Yacht and Assistance), but Newcombe was unable to find and recapture them. Hazard had been Matthew, of Sunderland, and was carrying a cargo of coals.
- Vengeur was in company with Grand Napoleon, which escaped. Vengeur herself did not surrender until Beagle came alongside, though her captain, M. Bourgnie, was wounded. Vengeur had made no captures.
- Fortune, under Captain Tucker, had one man badly wounded. She was out of Calais and had made no captures.

=== Participation at the Battle of the Basque Roads ===
Beagle arrived at Basque Roads on 10 April, having escorted from the Downs the convoy of fireships that were to attack the French anchorage the next day. Beagle was the second ship (after the bomb vessel Aetna) to voluntarily arrive to aid Cochrane's Imperieuse after the successful fireship attack, her crew reportedly giving Cochrane three cheers upon arriving. The prize crew that took possession and later burnt the French ship-of-the-line Calcutta, was under the command of a lieutenant from Beagle and a midshipman from Imperieuse. Beagle also took part in the bombardment of the French ships Aquilon and Ville de Varsovie, skilfully manoeuvring to fire, unlike other British ships that were anchoring to engage.

Beagle was one of the few ships joining Cochrane in ignoring Rear-Admiral Robert Stopford's recall order. Cochrane tasked her with protecting Aetna during the move upriver. Newcombe therefore placed Beagle between Aetna and the grounded French battleships. As a result, Beagle took heavy damage to her rigging and expended nearly all of her powder. Beagle had one man wounded.

Newcombe's achievements and valour resulted in his receiving promotion to post-captain after the battle. (Note: Head money was paid in March 1819. An ordinary seaman received 13 shillings; a first-class share was worth £86 13s 2¼d.) In 1847 the Admiralty awarded the then-surviving participants in the battle the Naval General Service Medal with the clasp "Basque Roads 1809". Two of Beagle's sister ships, Dotterel and Foxhound were also present at the Basque Roads.

=== Later years ===
Later in 1809 Commander William Dolling took command of Beagle, following Newcombe's promotion. In July and August, Beagle took part in the Scheldt operations.

On 4 November Beagle and Echo recaptured Mount Royal, of Pool. On 8 February 1810 Beagle recaptured the brig Resource. (Note: Resource, of 148 tons (bm), Drabwell, master, had been launched at Newcastle in 1794. She had been taken off Beachy Head on her way back to London from Lisbon.) On 10 October Dollin and Beagle captured the smuggling lugger Ox, for which they received a reward from the Commissioners of His Majesty's Customs.

On 13 June 1810 Beagle captured the smuggling boat Fly, of Bexhill. Three days later she captured several smuggling galleys. Apparently the officers and crew of Beagle purchased the cargo of two of the galleys and sold it.

Commander John Smith took command of Beagle in August 1811. On 14 August 1813, Beagle, in company with President, the gun-brig Urgent, and the schooner Juniper, captured Marmion.

Beagle, Juniper, and Holly participated in the Siege of San Sebastián (7 July – 8 September 1813) as part of the fleet under Captain George Collier assigned to help Sir Arthur Wellesley's campaigns in Portugal and Spain. Beagle had one man dangerously wounded in the taking of the battery on Santa Clara Island. Later, the seamen from the squadron, under Smith's command, maneuvered 24-pounder guns from Surveillante up the steep scarp of Saint Clara Island to assemble their own battery facing San Sebastian, which allowed them to silence the guns there. Smith was slightly wounded while being in charge of the seamen on shore engaged in taking the French battery on Saint Clara Island and in the subsequent operations. In 1847 the Admiralty authorized the issuance of the Naval General service Medal with clasp "St. Sebastian" to surviving participants in the campaign.

On 30 November Beagle was in company with Rover when Rover captured the American brig Empress.

== Fate ==
Beagle was laid up in ordinary at Plymouth in 1813. She was sold there on 21 July 1814 for the sum of £900.
