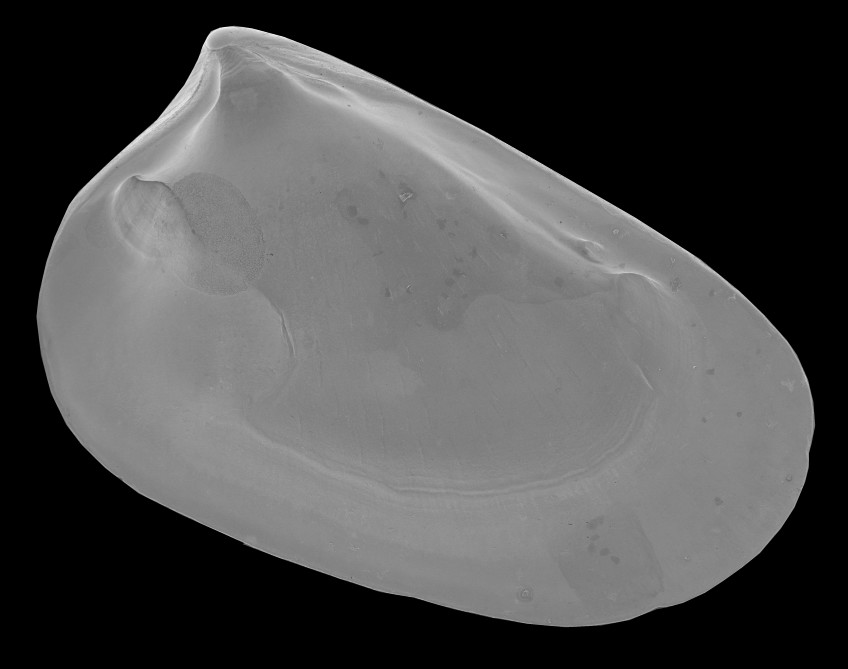
- Type specimen of Barythaerus biconvexus from the collections of Te Papa

Scientific classification
- Kingdom: Animalia
- Phylum: Mollusca
- Class: Bivalvia
- Family: Thraciidae
- Genus: Barythaerus
- Species: B. biconvexus

Binomial name
- Barythaerus biconvexus (Powell, 1927)

Synonyms
- Myadora biconvexa Powell, 1927

= Barythaerus biconvexus =

Species of bivalve

Barythaerus biconvexus is a marine bivalve mollusc of the family Thraciidae. It is endemic to New Zealand, with records off southern South Island and Stewart Island.

Barythaerus biconvexus measures up to 5.1 mm (0.20 in) in length. It is known from depths between 27–311 m (89–1,020 ft), with live specimens from bryozoan and shell substrates at intermediate depths (55–183 m).
