= Thomas Bradford =

British Army officer

General Sir Thomas Bradford GCB GCH
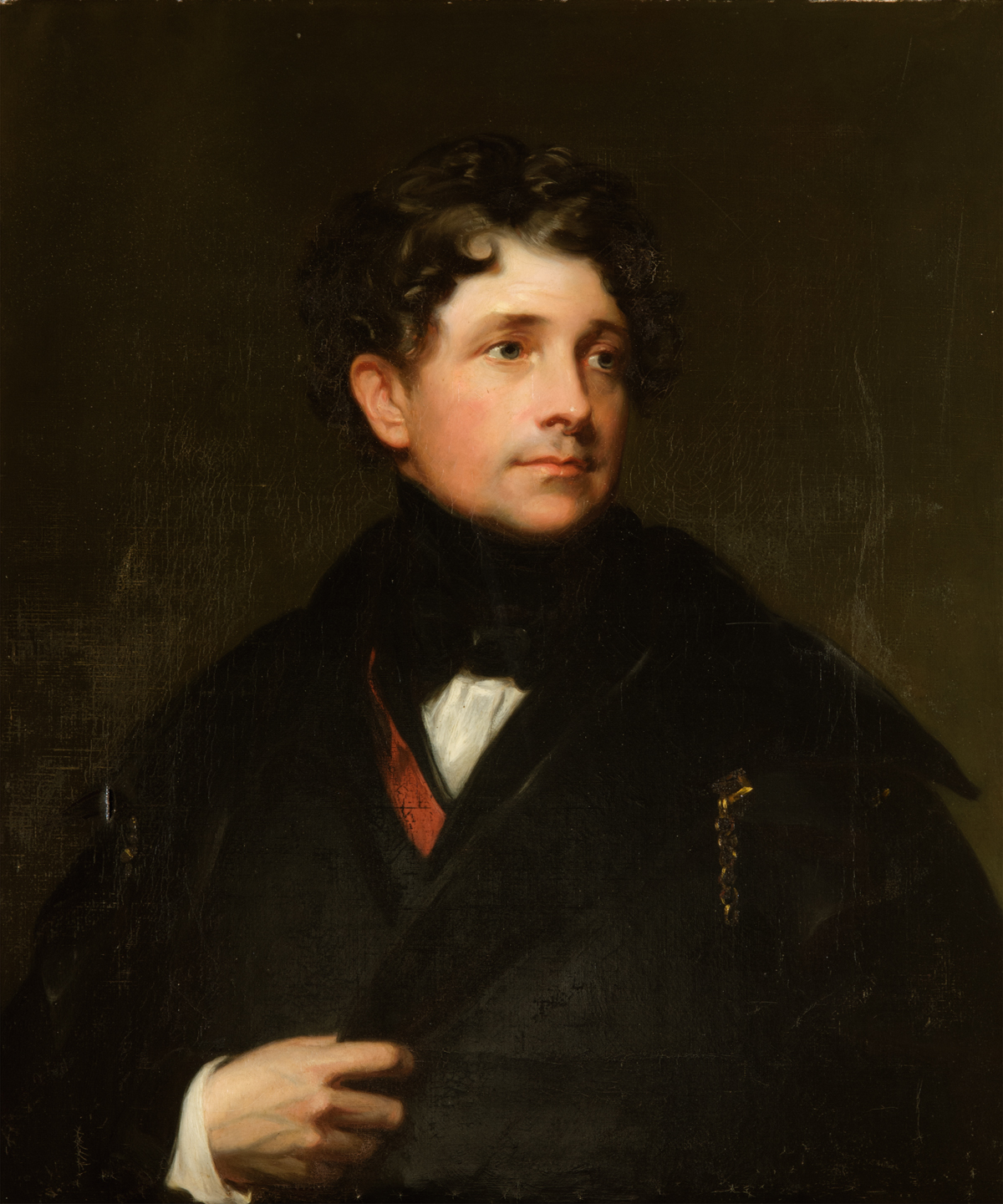
- Born: 1 December 1777
- Died: 28 November 1853 (aged 75); Eaton Square, London
- Relatives: Sir Henry Bradford (brother)
- Military career
- Allegiance: United Kingdom
- Branch: British Army
- Service years: 1792–1853
- Rank: General
- Commands: 34th Regiment of Foot; 82nd Regiment of Foot; 10th Portuguese Brigade; 3rd Division; 6th Brigade AOOF; 5th Brigade AOOF; Commander-in-Chief, Scotland; Bombay Army
- Conflicts: French Revolutionary Wars; Irish Rebellion of 1798; Napoleonic Wars; Hanover Expedition; British invasions of the River Plate; Battle of Montevideo; Second Battle of Buenos Aires; Peninsular War; Battle of Vimeiro; Battle of Corunna; Battle of Salamanca; Siege of Burgos; Siege of San Sebastián; Battle of Nive; Battle of Bayonne (WIA)
- Awards: Knight Grand Cross of the Order of the Bath; Knight Grand Cross of the Royal Guelphic Order; Army Gold Cross; Knight Commander of the Order of the Tower and the Sword (Portugal); Cruz da Guerra Peninsular (Portugal); Medalha De Distincao De Comando (Portugal)

General Sir Thomas Bradford GCB GCH (1 December 1777 – 28 November 1853) was a British Army officer.

== Military career ==
Bradford was commissioned as an ensign in the 4th (The King's Own) Regiment of Foot in October 1793 without purchase He took part in the suppression of the Irish Rebellion of 1798, the Buenos Aires Expedition of 1806 as well as the battle of Vimeiro in 1808, battle of Corunna in 1809 and battle of Salamanca in 1812 during the Peninsular War. He commanded a Portuguese division at the Battle of Vitoria, the Battle of San Sebastian and the Battle of the Nive, all in 1813. For his service in the Peninsular he was awarded the Gold Medal with one clasp.

He became general officer commanding the 7th Division of the Army of Occupation in France in 1815, Commander-in-Chief, Scotland in 1819 and Commander-in-Chief of the Bombay Army from 1825 to 1829. He was promoted to full general on 23 November 1841.

He was then colonel of the 94th Regiment of Foot (1823–29) and, after returning to England, colonel of the 30th Regiment of Foot (1829–46).

He exchanged the colonelcy of the 38th Foot for that of the 4th (The King's Own) Regiment of Foot in 1846, a position he held until his death in 1853.

== Family ==
He married Mary, the daughter of James Atkinson of Newcastle. His eldest son, James Henry Hollis Bradford, later changed his surname to Atkinson in compliance with the will of one Ralph Atkinson. His brother, Lieutenant-colonel Sir Henry Hollis Bradford, was also a distinguished soldier wounded at Waterloo.

== Sources ==
- Dalton, Charles (1904). The Waterloo roll call. With biographical notes and anecdotes. London: Eyre and Spottiswoode.

Military offices
Preceded by Sir Charles Colville	C-in-C, Bombay Army; 1826–1829	Succeeded by Sir Thomas Beckwith
Preceded by Sir John Hope	Commander-in-Chief, Scotland; 1819–1825	Succeeded by Sir Robert O'Callaghan
Preceded by John Hodgson	Colonel of the 4th (The King's Own) Regiment of Foot; 1846–1853	Succeeded by John Bell
Preceded by James Montgomerie	Colonel of the 30th (Cambridgeshire) Regiment of Foot; 1829–1846	Succeeded by George Hay, 8th Marquess of Tweeddale
Preceded by New regiment	Colonel of the 94th Regiment of Foot; 1823–1829	Succeeded by Sir John Keane, 1st Baron Keane
