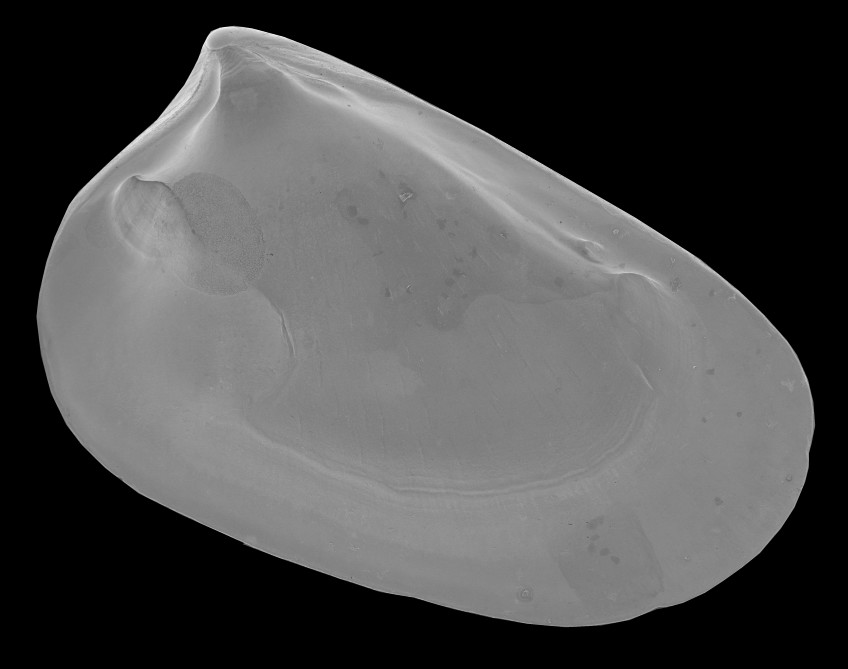
- Type specimen of Barythaerus biconvexus from the collections of Te Papa

Scientific classification
- Kingdom: Animalia
- Phylum: Mollusca
- Class: Bivalvia
- Family: Thraciidae
- Genus: Barythaerus; B. A. Marshall, 2002

Species
- 2 species (see text)

= Barythaerus =

Genus of bivalves

Barythaerus is a small genus of marine bivalve molluscs of the family Thraciidae. The genus is endemic to the waters off southern New Zealand. Shells have been found at depths of 27–805 m (89–2,641 ft). Live specimens have been found from bryozoan and shell substrates at intermediate depths (55–183 m).

== Species ==
There are two recognized species:

- Barythaerus biconvexus (A. W. B. Powell, 1927)
- Barythaerus cuneatus (A. W. B. Powell, 1937)

== Description ==
Barythaerus are small bivalves, with the larger species (Barythaerus cuneatus) reaching 5.5 mm (0.22 in) in length. The shell is stout with a beak located in the posterior 1/3–1/4 of the shell. Only the right valve has a prominent tooth. They resemble Parvithracia but are more stout and oblique.
