= Bushia =

Scientific classification
- Domain: Eukaryota
- Kingdom: Animalia
- Phylum: Mollusca
- Class: Bivalvia
- Superorder: Anomalodesmata
- Superfamily: Thracioidea
- Family: Thraciidae
- Genus: Bushia; Dall, 1886

Species
- See text.

Genus of bivalves

Bushia is a genus of saltwater clams in the family Thraciidae.

- Bushia elegans (Dall, 1886)
- Bushia rushii (Pilsbry, 1897)
