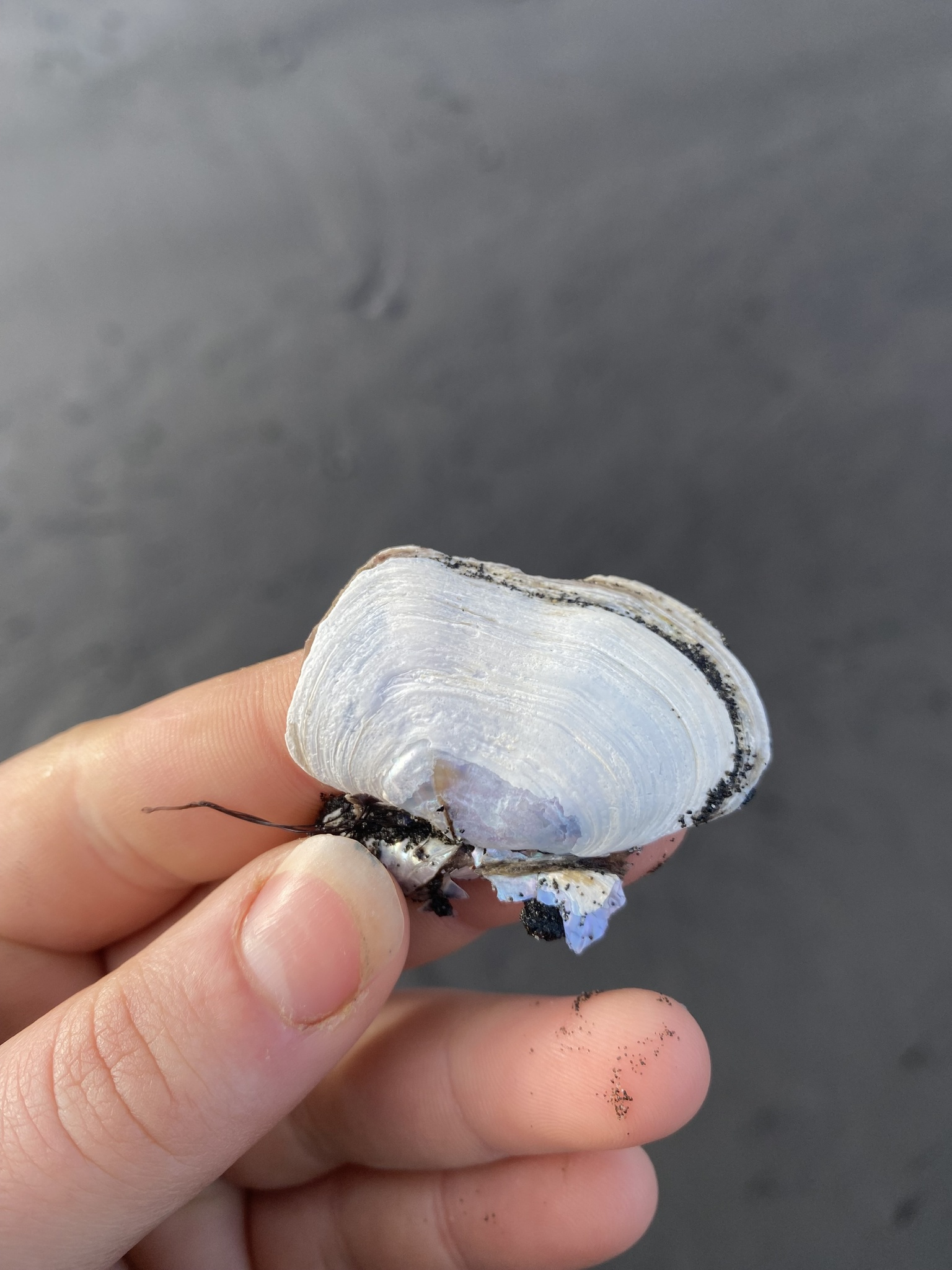

Scientific classification
- Kingdom: Animalia
- Phylum: Mollusca
- Class: Bivalvia
- Superfamily: Thracioidea
- Family: Laternulidae
- Genus: Laternula
- Species: L. elliptica

Binomial name
- Laternula elliptica (King & Broderip, 1832)

Synonyms
- Anatina elliptica King & Broderip, 1832; Anatina prismatica G.B. Sowerby I, 1834; Mya antarctica Melvill & Standen, 1914; Thracia antarctica Melvill & Standen, 1898

= Laternula elliptica =

Laternula elliptica Temporal range: Pliocene–Present

Species of bivalve

Laternula elliptica is a species of saltwater clam, a marine bivalve mollusc in the family Laternulidae, the lantern shells. It is the largest bivalve found under the surface of the seabed in the Southern Ocean.

== Discovery ==
The species was first described in 1832 by the captain of HMS Adventure, Phillip Parker King, and the English naturalist, William Broderip, having been discovered during the first exploration of the South American coastline in HMS Beagle. The title of the paper they published read "Description of Cirrhipedia, Conchifera and Mollusca, in a collection formed by the officers of H.M.S. Adventure and Beagle employed between the years 1826 and 1830 in surveying the southern coasts of South America, including the Straits of Magalhaens and the coast of Tierra del Fuego."

== Description ==
The shell of Laternula elliptica is thin, brittle, and slightly inflated and grows to a length of 10 centimetres (3.9 in). The left valve is slightly larger and more convex than the right. The general shape is an elongated oval with the posterior end somewhat truncated and narrower than the anterior end. The umbone is shallow and slightly nearer the posterior end and there is a characteristic short transverse crack in it. The internal ligament is supported by a diagonal ridge of shell and there are no teeth near the hinge. The exterior of the shell is white, slightly granular and sculptured with fine concentric lines. The interior of the shell is somewhat nacreous, with two adductor muscle scars and a pallial line that is slightly concave at the anterior end and has a broad pallial sinus at the posterior end. There is a gape at both ends of the shell and a pair of long siphons emerge from the posterior end being fused for their full length. The mantle margins are also fused apart from a small gap at the anterior end and the foot is small.

== Distribution and habitat ==
Laternula elliptica is found in the Southern Ocean, round Antarctica and the tip of Patagonia. It has been found in waters as shallow as the intertidal zone and as deep as the continental slope (~700 metres (2,300 ft)), but it is most common in shallow waters. It is found living in soft substrates such as muddy sand and gravel in which it burrows deeply. It is sometimes found in densities of upward of 100 individuals per square metre.

== Biology ==
Like other members of the family Laternulidae, Laternula elliptica is a filter feeder. It lies beneath the substrate with its siphons extended to the surface. Water is drawn in through the inhalant siphon by a pumping action of the gills. As it passes over the gill flaps, gaseous exchange takes place and phytoplankton and detritus are captured by cilia and moved in a flow of mucus to the mouth. The water then emerges through the exhalant siphon.

Laternula elliptica is a hermaphrodite. Fertilisation is external and epidemic spawning events sometimes occur. These greatly increase the concentration of gametes in the water and raises the rate of successful fertilisation of eggs. The embryos are lecithotrophic and the larvae remain inside the egg capsules and feed on the yolks of the eggs for some months before hatching direct into juveniles and settling on the seabed.

The concentric sculptured lines on the shell have been shown by radioactive carbon and oxygen dating to occur annually and have been used to tell the age of the animal. It has been found to live for up to twenty years.

== Fossil record ==
Fossils of Laternula elliptica dating back to the late Pliocene are common in certain sedimentary rocks on Cockburn Island and the James Ross Island group off the Antarctic Peninsula. Some of these fossils are still in the positions the molluscs occupied when alive and it has been found that they are all orientated in roughly the same direction, many with a variance of only 10° and all within a 66° range. This orientation is similar to the way in which the soft-shell clam (Mya arenaria) places itself at right angle to the main water movements it experiences, a positioning that is believed to optimise water flow through the siphons. Another bivalve, the freshwater pearl mussel (Margaritifera margaritifera), is not exposed to the ebb and flow of the tide and locates itself so that the inhalant siphon is upstream of the exhalant siphon. This rheotaxis may help Laternula elliptica maximise energy gain in the summer in an environment where the food availability and consequent growth of organisms varies greatly at different times of the year. The orientation of modern Laternula elliptica has not yet been studied.
