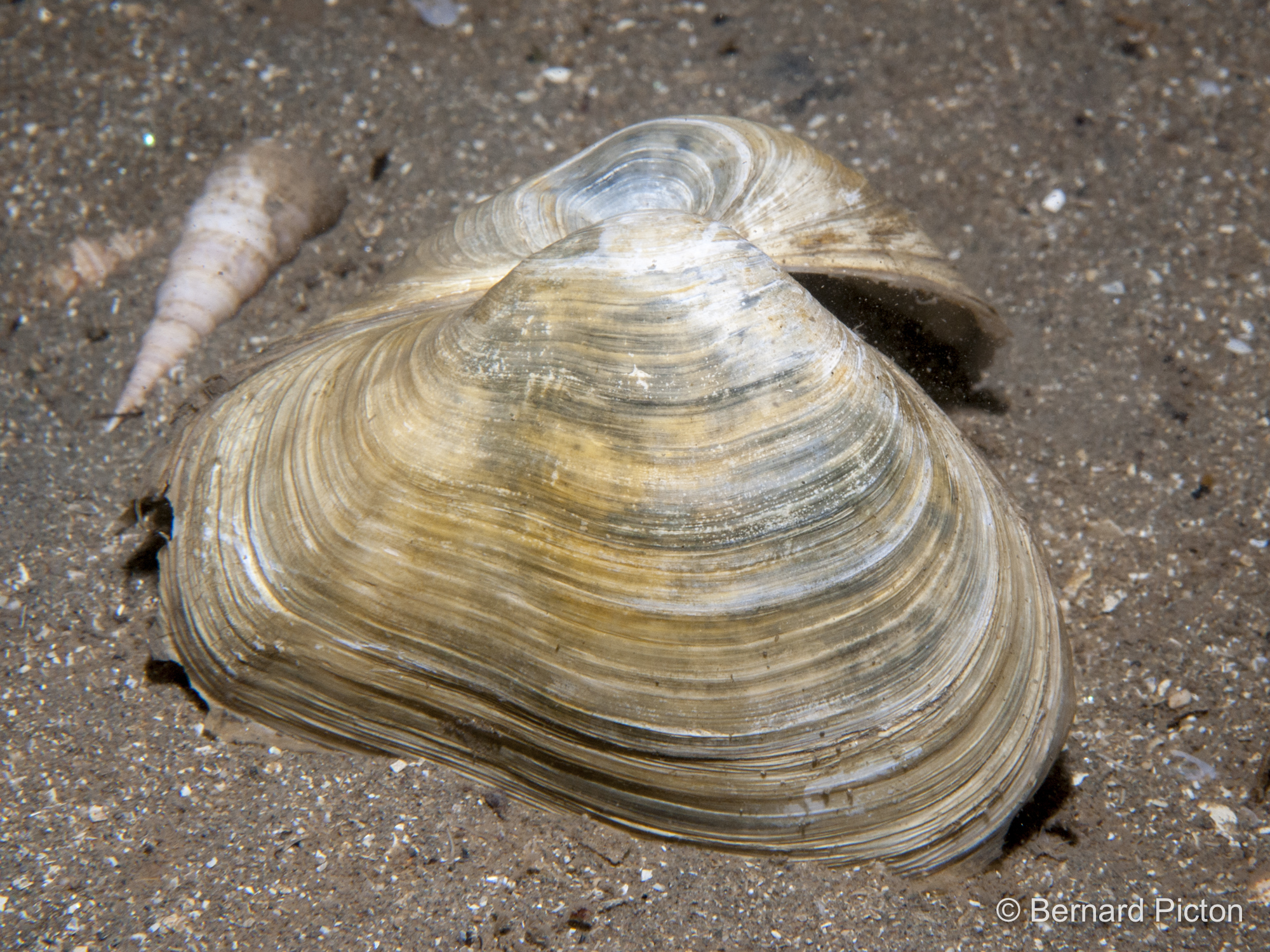

Scientific classification
- Kingdom: Animalia
- Phylum: Mollusca
- Class: Bivalvia
- Family: Thraciidae
- Genus: Thracia
- Species: T. convexa

Binomial name
- Thracia convexa (W. Wood, 1815)

= Thracia convexa =

Species of bivalve

Thracia convexa is a bivalve mollusc in the family Thraciidae.

== Description ==
Thracia convexa grows to about 6 centimetres (2.4 in) in length. The shell is inflated and brittle and the right valve is slightly larger and more convex than the left one. The outline is roughly triangular with the anterior end rounded and the posterior end somewhat elongated. The surface is sculptured with fine concentric lines and a slight ridge extends from the umbone to the margin of the valve on the posterior end. There are both external and internal ligaments joining the valves and there are no teeth on the hinge. On the inside of the valve, the posterior adductor muscle scar is large and triangular while the anterior one is long and thin. The pallial sinus is small. The valves gape at the posterior end where the two separate sinuses emerge. The colour of the valves is white both outside and inside and the periostracum, when present, is yellowish green.

== Distribution ==
Thracia convexa is found in the north east Atlantic, its range extending from Norway to the Mediterranean Sea. It is distributed widely round the coasts of Britain where it burrows in sandy or muddy substrates, extending its siphons to the surface to breathe and feed.
