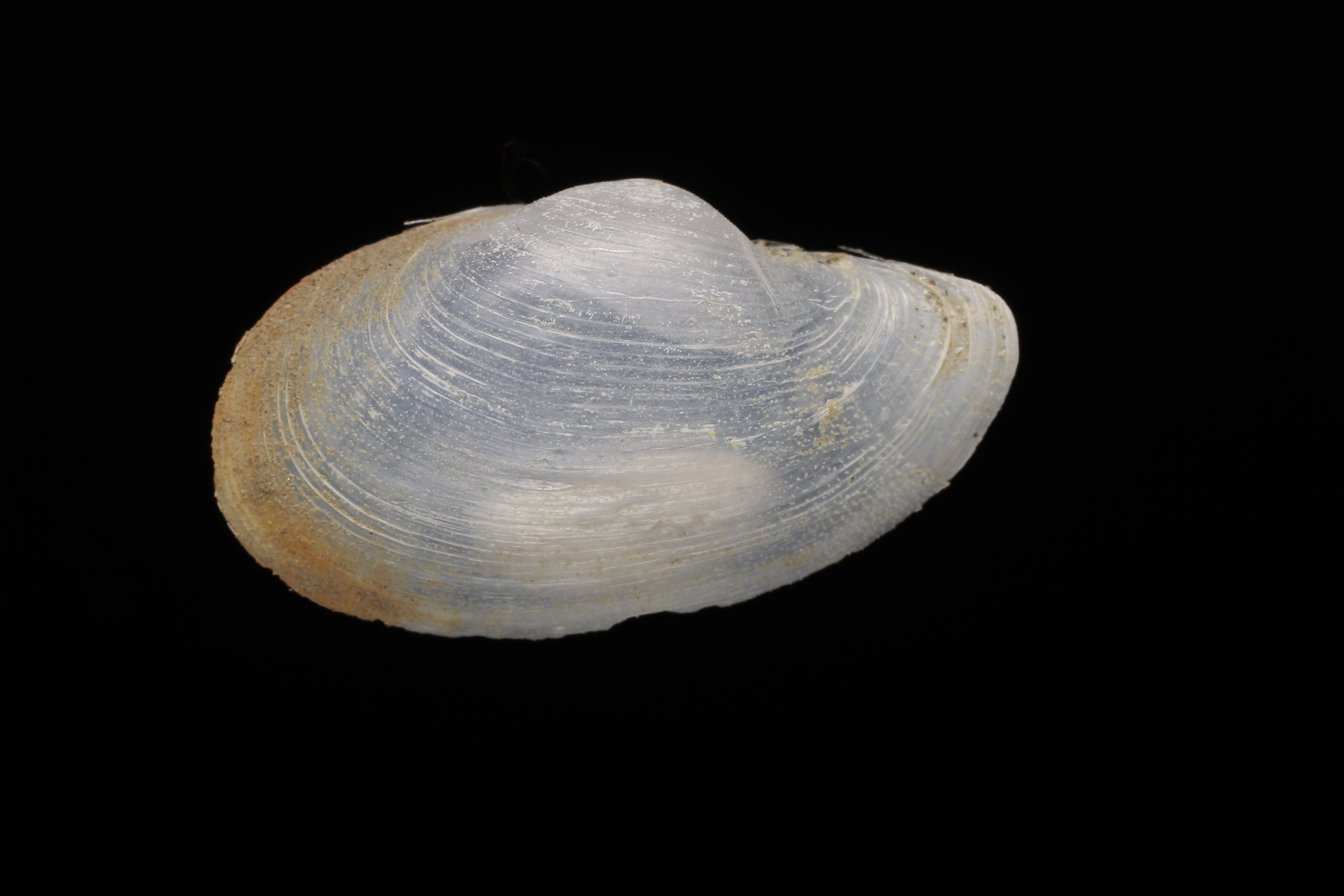
- Shell of Laternula takekosugei (holotype at MNHN, Paris)

Scientific classification
- Domain: Eukaryota
- Kingdom: Animalia
- Phylum: Mollusca
- Class: Bivalvia
- Superorder: Anomalodesmata
- Superfamily: Thracioidea
- Family: Laternulidae
- Genus: Laternula; Röding, 1798

Type species
- Solen anatinus Linnaeus, 1758

Synonyms
- Anatina Lamarck, 1818 (invalid: junior homonym of Anatina Schumacher, 1817; Butor and Butorella are replacement names); Auriscalpium Megerle von Mühlfeld, 1811; Butor Gistel, 1848; Butorella Strand, 1928; Laternula (Laternula) Röding, 1798; Laternulina Habe, 1952

= Laternula =

Genus of bivalves

Laternula is a genus of bivalves belonging to the family Laternulidae.

The genus has cosmopolitan distribution.

== Species ==
- Laternula albertensis Russell & Landes, 1937
- Laternula anatina (Linnaeus, 1758)
- Laternula argentea (Reeve, 1863) (taxon inquirendum)
- Laternula boschasina (Reeve, 1860)
- Laternula bullata (Reeve, 1863)
- Laternula corrugata (Reeve, 1863)
- Laternula creccina (Reeve, 1860)
- Laternula elliptica (P. P. King, 1832)
- Laternula gracilis (Reeve, 1860)
- Laternula impura (Pilsbry, 1901)
- Laternula japonica (Lischke, 1872)
- Laternula laterna (Lamarck, 1818)
- Laternula navicula (Reeve, 1863)
- Laternula takekosugei Thach, 2020
