= Cyathodonta plicata =

Scientific classification
- Kingdom: Animalia
- Phylum: Mollusca
- Class: Bivalvia
- Superfamily: Thracioidea
- Family: Thraciidae
- Genus: Cyathodonta
- Species: C. plicata

Binomial name
- Cyathodonta plicata (Deshayes, 1832)

Synonyms
- Thracia plicata Deshayes, 1832

Species of bivalve

Cyathodonta plicata is a bivalve mollusc in the family Thraciidae.

== Description ==
The ovate shell is oblong, transverse, equilateral, inequivalve, and inflated. The beaks are small, that of the left slightly notched. The valves are white, delicate, and diaphanous, rounded upon the anterior side, truncated obliquely upon the posterior sid. The side is bounded outwardly by an obtuse angle, which extends from the beak to the lower and posterior edges. The exterior surface presents some very prominent transverse folds, rounded, undulating, more or less numerous. The cardinal edge is straight, and presents upon each valve a small horizontal hollow, triangular, not very thick, in which is confined a small internal ligament, which shows itself a little externally. Internally the valves are white, and transversely plaited. The anterior muscular impression is very superficial, elongated, and very narrow; the posterior rounded and small. It is united to the anterior by a pallial impression, deeply notched posteriorly.

== Distribution ==
Cyathodonta plicata is found off the U.S. Virgin Islands, Saint Thomas.
