= Cyathodonta =

Scientific classification
- Domain: Eukaryota
- Kingdom: Animalia
- Phylum: Mollusca
- Class: Bivalvia
- Superorder: Anomalodesmata
- Superfamily: Thracioidea
- Family: Thraciidae
- Genus: Cyathodonta; Conrad, 1849

Type species
- Cyathodonta undulata Conrad, 1849

Species
- See text

Genus of bivalves

Cyathodonta is a genus of bivalve mollusc in the family Thraciidae.

== Species ==
- Cyathodonta cruziana Dall, 1915
- Cyathodonta dubiosa Dall, 1915
- Cyathodonta granulosa (Adams & Reeve, 1850)
- Cyathodonta pedroana Dall, 1915
- Cyathodonta plicata (Deshayes, 1832)
- Cyathodonta rugosa (Lamarck, 1818)
- Cyathodonta tumbeziana Olsson, 1961
- Cyathodonta undulata Conrad, 1849

Species brought into synonymy

- Cyathodonta galapagana Dall, 1915: synonym of Bushia galapagana (Dall, 1915)
- Cyathodonta lucasana Dall, 1915: synonym of Cyathodonta undulata Conrad, 1849
- Cyathodonta rectangulata Macsotay, 1968: synonym of Cyathodonta rugosa (Lamarck, 1818)
