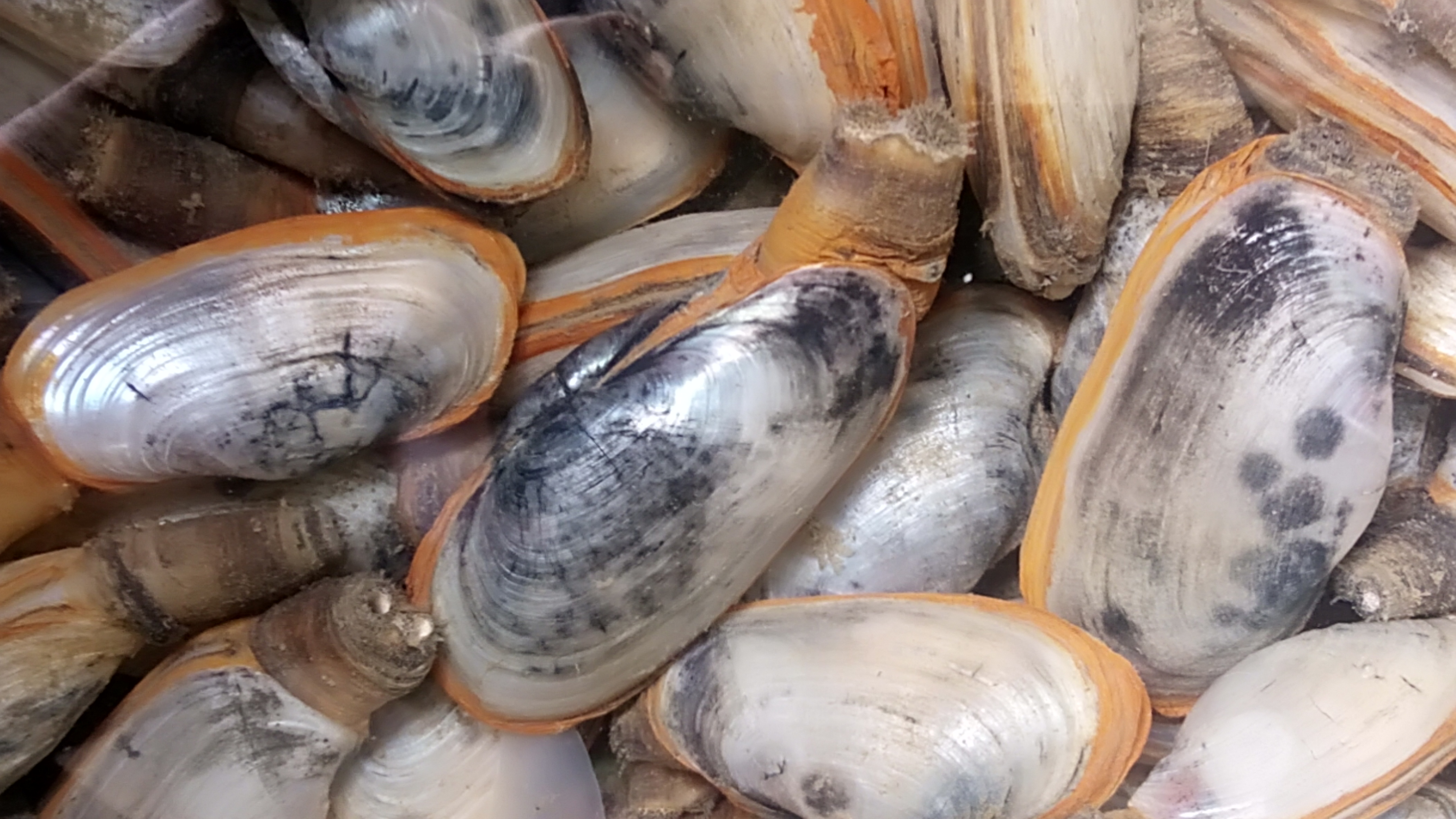
- Laternula marilina

Scientific classification
- Kingdom: Animalia
- Phylum: Mollusca
- Class: Bivalvia
- Superorder: Anomalodesmata
- Superfamily: Thracioidea
- Family: Laternulidae; Hedley, 1918

Genera
- Clistoconcha; Laternula

= Laternulidae =

Family of bivalves

Laternulidae, common name lantern clams, is a family of saltwater clams, marine bivalve molluscs in the order Anomalodesmata.

== Description ==
Members of this family have thin, brittle shells that have an elongated oval shape. The valves are white with concentric sculpturing, low umbones, and a gap at both ends. The left valve is slightly larger and more convex than the right valve. The ligament is internal and there are no teeth on the hingeline. The interior of the valve is subnacreous, there are two adductor muscle scars and the pallial line has a broad pallial sinus. The siphons are long and fused for their full length. The mantle margins are also fused except for a small gap at the anterior end.

== Genera and species ==
- Clistoconcha E.A. Smith, 1910
  - Clistoconcha insignis E.A. Smith, 1910
- Laternula Röding, 1798
  - Laternula anatina (Linnaeus, 1758)
  - Laternula argentea (Reeve, 1863)
  - Laternula attenuata (Reeve, 1863)
  - Laternula boschasina (Reeve, 1860)
  - Laternula creccina (Reeve, 1860)
  - Laternula elliptica (King & Broderip, 1832)
  - Laternula erythraea Morris & Morris, 1993
  - Laternula faba (Reeve, 1863)
  - Laternula gracilis (Reeve, 1860)
  - Laternula impura (Pilsbry, 1901)
  - Laternula laterna (Lamarck, 1818)
  - Laternula liautaudi (Mittre, 1844)
  - Laternula limicola (Reeve, 1863)
  - Laternula navicula (Reeve, 1863)
  - Laternula recta (Reeve, 1863)
  - Laternula rostrata (G.B. Sowerby II, 1839)
  - Laternula spengleri (Gmelin, 1791)
  - Laternula subrostrata (Lamarck, 1818)
  - Laternula tasmanica (Reeve, 1863)
  - Laternula vagina (Reeve, 1863)
  - Laternula valenciennesii (Reeve, 1863)
