= HMS Bramble (1809) =

History

United Kingdom
- Name: HMS Bramble
- Ordered: February 1808
- Builder: Dell, Bermuda
- Launched: 1809
- Fate: Sold 14 December 1815

United Kingdom
- Name: Bramble (or Bamble)
- Acquired: 1815 by purchase
- Fate: Last listed 1824

General characteristics
- Class & type: Shamrock-class schooner
- Tons burthen: 15032/94 (bm)
- Length: 78 ft 8 in (24.0 m); 60 ft 8 1/8 in (18.494 m)
- Beam: 21 ft 7 in (6.58 m)
- Draught: 7 ft 10 in (2.39 m)
- Complement: 50
- Armament: 2 × 6-pounder guns + 6 × 12-pounder carronades
- Notes: All measurements are per design, not "as built"

HMS Bramble was launched in Bermuda in 1809. She had a relatively brief and uneventful career before the Royal Navy sold her in December 1815. She became the mercantile Bramble (or Bamble), and was last listed in 1824.

== Career ==
Lieutenant John Fleming commissioned Bramble in August 1808 in Bermuda. In March 1813 Fleming commissioned HMS Barbadoes, by which time Bramble was already under the command of Lieutenant Henry Freeman Young Pogson, who had assumed command on 26 August 1812. While under Pogson's command, Bramble was employed in carrying despatches to the coasts of Spain and North America.

On 1 November 1812 Bramble, Lieutenant Pogson, captured the Prussian brig De Twee Gebroeders, Joseph Dorman, master.

On 4 March 1813 Bramble sent into Plymouth Habnab, Vibers, master, for a breach of the revenue laws. Habnab had been sailing from Bay Chaleurs to Corruna.

On 31 March Bramble and Arrow were in company at the capture of the American brig Lightning. They were also in company on 15 April at the capture of the letter of marque Caroline. (Note: Caroline was a schooner of 157 tons (bm), armed with six guns and having a crew of 28 men under the command of Samuel Spafford. She operated out of New Orleans. On a previous cruise as a privateer she had captured two prizes, neither of which succeeded in arriving at an American port.)

On 7 May there was an auction of the cargo of the American vessel Hope, Benjamin Holbrook, master, which Bramble had captured coming into Corruna from Philadelphia. Hope had been sailing under a license issued by the British government and so the Admiralty Court in Plymouth restored her to her owners. However, her cargo had to be sold both to pay expenses and because she had arrived at Plymouth in a distressed state.

On 15 May Bramble brought into Plymouth Lord Wellington, bound for Guernsey, and coming from Gibraltar and Corunna.

In June 1814 Lieutenant Thomas Nichols assumed command of Bramble.

On 28 June Count de Faironneye arrived at Fowey after Bramble had detained her. Count de Faironneye had been sailing from Guadeloupe.

On 7 July Bramble was off Madeira when she captured Triton, Menderema, master, which had been on her way to Havana or Guadeloupe from Bordeaux. Triton arrived at Fowey on 18 July.

Triton, of 27852/94 tons (bm), 99 ft 0 in (30.2 m) and 26 ft 3 in (8.0 m), was brand-new, copper-bottomed, and pierced for 10 guns, though she mounted only two. She was offered for auction in Plymouth on 3 May 1816.

Disposal: The "Principal Officers and Commissioners of His Majesty's Navy" offered "Bramble schooner, of 150 tons", "lying at Deptford", for sale on 14 December 1815. She sold on that day for £600.

== Merchantman ==
Bamble [sic] appeared in Lloyd's Register LR) in 1816, as a barque.

Year	Master	Owner	Trade	Source
1816	John Jenkins	Goss & Co.	Poole–Newfoundland	LR

She was last listed in 1824, with unchanged data.
