= Lord Wellington (1809 ship) =

History

United Kingdom
- Name: Lord Wellington
- Namesake: Arthur Wellesley, 1st Duke of Wellington
- Builder: R & J Bulmer, South Shields
- Launched: 1809
- Fate: Condemned c.1842

General characteristics
- Tons burthen: 50188/94, or 506 (bm)
- Length: 113 ft 2 in (34.5 m)
- Beam: 32 ft 7 in (9.9 m)
- Propulsion: Sail
- Armament: 10 × 18-pounder carronades

Lord Wellington was launched in 1809 at Shields. She initially sailed as a London-based transport and then made two voyages to India, and one to Mauritius. Thereafter she traded widely until she was condemned c.1842.

== Career ==
Lord Wellington first appeared in the Register of Shipping (RS) in 1810 with Hunter, master, Bulmer & Co., owner, and trade Shields–London. Lloyd's Register (LR) for 1811 showed her with R.Gallilee, master, Bulmer, owner, and trade London transport.

In 1813 the EIC lost its monopoly on the trade between India and Britain. British ships were then free to sail to India or the Indian Ocean under a license from the EIC.

Captain W.H. Harris sailed Lord Wellington to Bombay in August 1816, and again on 5 November 1818. In 1820 he sailed her to Île de France.

Year	Master	Owner	Trade	Source & notes
1823	Bell; Ward	Soames	London–Quebec	LR; good repair 1823
1825	J.Marshall	Soames	Plymouth–New Brunswick	LR; thorough repair 1816 & good repair 1823
1830	W.Richards; A.Palmer	J.Palmer	Cork–Halifax, Nova Scotia	LR; good repairs in 1823, 1824, & 1829
1830	P.Jones	Somes	Cowes–Portsmouth	LR (1830 supple. pages); good repairs in 1823, 1824, & 1829; small repairs 1830
1835	R.Wylam	Somes & Co.	London–Barbados	LR
1840	Tait	G.Redman	London–Africa	LR; damages repaired 1838
1842	Walker	G.Redman	London–Africa	LR; damages repaired 1838

== Fate ==
The entry for Lord Wellington in LR for 1842 carries the annotation "Condemned".
