= Henry Bradford =

British Army officer

Lieutenant-Colonel Sir Henry Hollis Bradford KCB (25 June 1781 – 7 December 1816) was a British Army officer who fought in the Peninsular War and was wounded at the Battle of Waterloo.

== Career ==
He was the third and youngest son of Thomas Bradford, of Woodlands, near Doncaster and Ashdown Park, Sussex and Elizabeth, daughter of William Otter, of Welham, Nottinghamshire. Originally an ensign in the 1st West York Militia, he was gazetted as ensign without purchase in the 4th Foot on 6 November 1801. He purchased a lieutenancy in January 1801. Appointed aide-de-camp to the Earl of Chatham, he saw service in the Peninsular War at the battles of Corunna, Salamance, Vittoria, The Pyrenees, Nivelle, Orthes and Toulouse.

At Waterloo, as an assistant Quarter-Master General attached to the 1st Regiment of Foot Guards, he was severely wounded.

For his service he was appointed to the Dutch Order of Wilhelm, and of the Russian Order of St. Vladimir. He died at La Vacherie, France on 7 December 1816, of wounds received at Waterloo and is buried in Storrington, Sussex.

Bradford's name is inscribed on Panel VIII in the Guards Chapel, Wellington Barracks.

== See also ==
- Lieutenant-General Thomas Bradford, his brother.
