= Mariner (1809 ship) =

History

United Kingdom
- Name: Mariner
- Owner: 1811:Alder & Co.; 1816:Birdwood & Co.; 1818:Boson & Co.; 1823:Evans & Co.
- Builder: Philadelphia
- Launched: 1809
- Fate: Wrecked 1 July 1823

General characteristics
- Tons burthen: 262, or 26275/94, (bm)
- Length: 91 ft 5 in (27.9 m)
- Beam: 26 ft 3 in (8.0 m)
- Propulsion: Sail
- Armament: 6 × 18-pounder carronades

Mariner was launched at Philadelphia in 1809. The British seized her for trading with the French and she became a British merchantman. She was wrecked in July 1823.

== Career ==
Mariner was condemned in Prize Court on 4 February 1810, for trading with the French.

Mariner first appeared in Lloyd's Register (LR) in 1811, with Rd. Yeo, master, Alder & Co., owners, and trade Plymouth. The next year her master changed to W. Rutter, and her trade was listed as "London transport". In 1816, her owner was Birdwood & Co.

LR for 1820, showed Mariner with J.Collett, master, Boson & Co., owner, and trade Plymouth–Leghorn, changing to London–Jamaica. She had undergone a large repair in 1815.

== Fate ==
LR in 1824 showed Mariner with J. Douglas, master, Evans, owner, and trade Liverpool-New South Wales.

Lloyd's List reported on 17 February 1824, that Mariner, Douglas, master, had sailed from New South Wales for Rio de Janeiro and England on 11 March 1823. She had stopped at the Bay of Islands, New Zealand, in April and had left there on 2 May. She had not been heard of since leaving New Zealand.

Mariner was wrecked on 1 July 1823, on Chiloé Island, in the Chiloé Archipelago, Chile. Three crew members lost their lives.
