= Nimrod (1809 ship) =

Ships

History

United Kingdom
- Name: Nimrod
- Builder: D. Munn, Montreal
- Acquired: 1810
- Fate: Wrecked 17 February 1813

General characteristics
- Tons burthen: 383, or 384, or 385 (bm)
- Armament: 14 × 12-pounder guns

Nimrod was launched in Montreal, Quebec in 1809. She transferred her registry to England, and started trading between Great Britain and Honduras. She was wrecked on 17 February 1813.

== Career ==
Nimrod transferred her registry from Quebec City to Greenock, Scotland on 2 January 1810, at (Port) No. 4. Nimrod first appeared in Lloyd's Register (LR) in 1810.

Year	Master	Owner	Trade	Source
1810	M'Culloch	Alexander	Greenock–Honduras	LR
1813	J.Jack	Ritchie & Co.	London–Honduras	LR

== Fate ==
Nimrod, Jack, master, was wrecked on 17 February 1813 near Beachy Head. Jack, two mates, and nine seamen drowned; part of her cargo was saved.
