= Aid-class storeship =

Class overview
- Built: 6

General characteristics
- Class & type: Aid-class storeship
- Tons burthen: 313 47/94 (bm)
- Length: 105 ft 5 in (32.13 m) (overall); 87 ft 2 in (26.57 m)
- Beam: 26 ft (7.9 m)
- Draught: 17 ft 6 in (5.33 m)
- Propulsion: Sails
- Complement: 39
- Armament: none

The Aid class of Royal Navy ships were the only purpose-built auxiliary ships constructed for the Navy during the Napoleonic Wars. The vessels were designed in 1808 by the Surveyors of the Navy for both transport and storage.

Name	Built by	Ordered	Laid down	Launched	Fate
Aid	Josiah & Thomas Brindly, Kings Lynn	1808	July 1808	4 April 1809	Converted to survey ship in 1816, sold 1853
Assistance	John Dudman, Deptford	1808	October 1808	7 March 1809	Sold 1821
Chatham	Josiah & Thomas Brindly, Frindsbury	1810	October 1810	22 June 1811	Broken up 1864
Portsmouth	Milford Dockyard	1810	October 1810	29 September 1811	Broken up 1834
Diligence	Jabez Bayley, Ipswich	1813	October 1813	30 October 1814	Sold 1904
Industry	James Warwick, Eling	1813	January 1814	13 October 1814	Broken up 1846
