= Welton (1809 ship) =

Ship

History

United Kingdom
- Name: Welton
- Namesake: Welton, East Riding of Yorkshire
- Owner: T. Barkworth & Co.
- Builder: W. Gibson, Hull
- Launched: 29 July 1809
- Fate: Wrecked 1817

General characteristics
- Tons burthen: 347, or 351 (bm)
- Armament: 8 × 6-pounder guns

Welton (or Wilton) was launched at Hull in 1809. She first traded between Hull and Quebec and then later with South America and the Caribbean. Lastly, she traded with India. She was lost in 1817 at Bengal.

== Career ==
Welton first entered Lloyd's Register (LR) in 1809 with Rd Evans, master, Barkworth, owner, and trade Hull–Quebec.

In 1814 Welton underwent repairs. The Register of Shipping for 1815 showed her master as Balston, and her trade changing from Hull–Rio de Janeiro to London–Barbados.

In 1813 the British East India Company (EIC) had lost its monopoly on the trade between Britain and India and numerous vessel owners started trading east of the Cape of Good Hope under licenses from the EIC. Lloyd's Register for 1816 showed Welton's master changing from E. Bullstone to J. Gritton, and her trade from London–Barbados to London–Île de France.

A list of "Country and Licensed Ships" showed Welton, J. Gritton, master, sailing for Bombay on 15 May 1815.

== Fate ==
The Register of Shipping for 1818 showed Welton with J. Gritton, master, and trade London–Bengal.

Lloyd's List reported on 13 January 1818 that Wilton, Wallis, master (late Gritton), had been lost in August on the Hooghly River. Then on 23 January Lloyd's List reported that Wilton, Wallis, master had capsized in the Hooghly on 14 August 1817 as she was sailing from Bengal to London, but that the crew had been saved. Another report stated that Welton, Wallace, master, had capsized on 18 August after striking the Ryapore Sand. She had been carrying cotton, sugar, ice, etc. and that although the captain and crew were saved, she was lost so rapidly that the crew's personal possessions, the mails, and her cargo were all lost.
