= Hebe (1809 ship) =

British West Indiaman (1809–1811)

History

United Kingdom
- Name: Hebe
- Namesake: Hebe
- Owner: Cheesewright
- Launched: 1809
- Captured: 16 December 1811

General characteristics
- Tons burthen: 413, or 414 (bm)
- Complement: 25
- Armament: 1810:12 × 6-pounder guns; 1811:2 × 6-pounder guns + 12 × 9-pounder carronades

Hebe was launched at Sunderland in 1809 as a West Indiaman. French privateers captured her in December 1811 after a strong resistance that resulted in her sustaining heavy casualties.

She first appeared in Lloyd's Register (LR) in 1809 with Richardson, master, Cheesewright, owner, and trade England–Demerara.

Year	Master	Owner	Trade	Source
1811	Richardson; Brown	Cheesewright	London–Demerara	Register of Shipping

Captain William Brown acquired a letter of marque on 30 August 1810.

On 19 July 1811, Hebe, William Brown, master, was scheduled to leave Demerara and join the West India convoy on 1 August, or possibly to run direct to London. On 19 September, Hebe was reloading her cargo at Tortola, having put in there in distress as she was sailing from Demerara to London.

As Hebe continued her journey from Demerara to London, on 16 December three privateers attacked her. She was able to sink one before her attackers boarded and captured her. She suffered seven men killed and some wounded.

Her entry in the Register of Shipping (RS) for 1812 carried the annotation "CAPTURED". Lloyd's Register continued to carry her for five more years with stale data.
