= HMS Holly (1809) =

History

United Kingdom
- Name: HMS Holly
- Ordered: February 1808
- Builder: Bermuda
- Launched: 1809
- Honours and awards: Naval General Service Medal with clasp "St. Sebastian"
- Fate: Wrecked 29 January 1814

General characteristics
- Class & type: Shamrock-class schooner
- Tons burthen: 15032/94, or 172 (bm)
- Length: 78 ft 8 in (24.0 m); 60 ft 8 1/8 in (18.494 m)
- Beam: 21 ft 7 in (6.58 m)
- Draught: 7 ft 10 in (2.39 m)
- Complement: 50
- Armament: 2 × 6-pounder guns + 6 × 12-pounder carronades
- Notes: All measurements are per design, not "as built"

HMS Holly was launched in Bermuda in 1809. She participated in the capture of San Sebastián in 1813, a campaign that resulted in the Admiralty awarding her crew the Naval General Service Medal. She was wrecked in January 1814.

== Career ==
Holly was commissioned by Lieutenant Samuel Sharpe Treacher. She remained on the North America station until she sailed to Portsmouth, where she underwent repairs in November and December 1811. She sailed to Newfoundland in 1812 and to the North Sea in 1813.

On 23 July 1813, Holly was part of a squadron with HMS Armada. The seas pushed Armada into range of French batteries at Borgidhero; the batteries opened fire but the shots went over Armada. Armada landed her marines who captured the eastern battery and then entered the battery on the point of Borgidhero after the French had tried to blow it up. The marines spiked the guns. The landing party took fire from the nearby town so the frigates accompanying Armada fired on the town while the landing party burnt some vessels on the shore.

In August–September, Holly was part of a squadron of some 17 vessels, including Juniper and Beagle, that participated in the siege of San Sebastián. Because of the shallowness of the water, only the smaller vessels could approach closely enough to bring their guns to bear on the town's defenses. In 1847 the Admiralty awarded the clasp "St. Sebastian" to the Naval General Service Medal to all surviving naval participants at the siege.

== Fate ==
Holly was sailing along the coast of northern Spain on 28 January 1814 when the weather deteriorated to the point that Treacher decided to shelter at San Sebastián. During the night the gale parted her anchor cable and drove her onto the rocks under Mount Aguillo. She started to break up almost immediately. Her mainmast fell over onto the rocks and most of the crew were able to use it to escape the wreck. Even so, Lieutenant Treacher and three other men drowned.

The initial report in Lloyd's List gave the casualties as Lieutenant Treacher and between six and eight crew.

== Bibliography ==
- Hepper, David J. (1994). British Warship Losses in the Age of Sail, 1650–1859. Rotherfield: Jean Boudriot. ISBN 0-948864-30-3.
- Winfield, Rif (2008). British Warships in the Age of Sail 1793–1817: Design, Construction, Careers and Fates. Seaforth Publishing. ISBN 9781861762467.
