= Elizabeth (1809 ship) =

History

United Kingdom
- Name: Elizabeth
- Owner: 1809: Lowbridge and Richard Bright; 1809: J. Birch & Co.
- Builder: Buckle & Davies, Chepstow
- Launched: 1809
- Fate: Not listed after 1832; possibly lost in December 1831
- Notes: The change in ownership in 1809 represents a purchase and sale, not disagreement.

General characteristics
- Tons burthen: 480, or 481, or 482 (bm)
- Propulsion: Sail
- Armament: 1809: 12 × 9-pounder guns

Elizabeth was a merchant ship built at Chepstow, Wales in 1809. She made three voyages transporting convicts from England and Ireland to Australia. Elizabeth is no longer listed after 1832 and may have been lost in 1831.

== Career ==
Lloyd's Register for 1810 shows Elizabeth with R. Sherrat, master, J. Birch, owner, and trade Bristol-Saint Kitts. Elizabeth returned to Bristol in October 1813, but never again after that.

In 1813 the EIC had lost its monopoly on the trade between India and Britain. British ships were then free to sail to India or the Indian Ocean under a licence from the EIC.

Elizabeth sailed for Batavia in May 1814, in company with Commerce; these two ships were the first East Indiamen to sail from Bristol. Her master was either de Peyster, or Ostler.

Elizabeth's owners applied for such a licence on 1 April 1816 and received it the next day.

Under the command of William Ostler and surgeon Carver Vickery, she left England on 4 June 1816 and arrived in Sydney on 5 October. (Note: Ostler committed suicide near the Cape of Good Hope during the night of 9 September 1826 while returning to Britain from China as the captain of the East Indiaman Marquess of Hastings.) She embarked 153 male convicts, two of whom died route. A detachment of the 46th Regiment of Foot, under Captain Humphries, provided the guard. Elizabeth later left Port Jackson bound for India.

On 9 September 1817 she was returning from Bengal when contrary winds forced her to put into Shannon where she replenished her water and provisions. She had left Bengal on 29 March in company with Harriet, Waterloo, and Woodman. She had parted from them, "all well", at Cape of Good Hope on 29 July.

On her second convict voyage, again under Ostler's command, but with surgeon William Hamilton, she left Cork, Ireland on 26 July 1818 and arrived in Sydney on 19 November. She embarked 101 female convicts and had no deaths en route. She left Port Jackson in December 1818, bound for Bengal.

For her third convict voyage, under the command of William Ostler and surgeon Andrew Montgomery, she left The Downs, England on 18 August 1820 and arrived in Sydney on 31 December. She embarked 171 male convicts and had no convict deaths en route. Elizabeth departed Port Jackson on 13 February 1821 bound for Madras.

Lloyd's Register of 1823 showed Elizabeth with owner J. Birch, and J. Tucker, master, with trade London-Quebec, changing to J. Sharp, master, with trade Liverpool-Africa.

In 1825 Elizabeth, Donald Morrison, master, carried 209 assisted immigrants from Cork to Quebec under a scheme organized by Peter Robinson. Elizabeth left Cork on 16 May and arrived at Quebec on 1 July.

Year	Master	Owner	Trade
1825	Sharpe; Morrison	Ward; Benson & Co.	London—Africa; London—Quebec
1830	Morrison	Benson & Co.	London—Quebec

== Fate ==
Elizabeth was last listed in the Register of Shipping for 1832. She may have been the Elizabeth that wrecked on 7 December 1831 in the Atlantic Ocean and whose crew consequently abandoned her on 12 December and were rescued by Juno. Elizabeth was on a voyage from Quebec to London.
