= HMS Juniper (1809) =

History

United Kingdom
- Name: HMS Juniper
- Ordered: February 1808
- Builder: Bermuda
- Laid down: 1808
- Launched: 1809
- Honours and awards: Naval General Service Medal with clasp "St. Sebastian"
- Fate: Sold 3 November 1814

General characteristics
- Class & type: Shamrock-class schooner
- Tons burthen: 15032/94 (bm)
- Length: Overall:78 ft 8 in (24.0 m); Keel:60 ft 8 1/8 in (18.5 m)
- Beam: 21 ft 7 in (6.6 m)
- Depth of hold: 7 ft 10 in (2.4 m)
- Sail plan: Schooner
- Armament: 6 × 12-pounder carronades + 2 × 6-pounder guns

HMS Juniper was launched at Bermuda in 1809 for the British Royal Navy. She participated in one campaign for which her crew was awarded the Naval General Service Medal (1847) with clasp "San Sebastian". She also participated in the capture of several merchant ships. The Navy sold her in 1814.

== Career ==
Lieutenant Nathaniel Vassall commissioned Juniper at Halifax in 1809.

On 27 October 1809 Juniper sent into Bermuda the American brig Sukey, Osgood, master. Sukey had been sailing from Sumatra to Salem.

On 15 July 1812 HMS Spartan and Juniper captured the brig Start. Start, of 173 tons (bm), P.Hazelton, master, had been sailing from St Ubes to Newburyport, Massachusetts with a cargo of salt. (Note: A second-class share of the prize money awarded to Juniper was worth £24 6s 7d; this was the award that Lieutenant Vassall received. A sixth-class share, that of an ordinary seaman, was worth £1 10s 8 1/4d.)

On 6 July Juniper captured the American vessel Friendship. (Note: A second-class share of the prize money was worth £199 14s 7 3/4d; a sixth-class share was worth £19 6s 5d, or almost a year's wages.) Lloyd's List reported that the Juniper cutter had detained Friendship, Wood, master, on 22 July. Juniper removed $20,000 of goods and permitted Friendship to proceed on to Boston.

On 27 December 1812 Juniper sailed from Rio de Janeiro as escort to four British merchant vessels bound for Great Britain; one was 1790 ship, Jackson, master, bound for Greenock. One of the vessels, Elizabeth, Holt, master, immediately developed a leak and next morning turned back for Rio. Before evening, the USS Essex captured her and on 17 January 1813 took her into Rio. An American master and prize crew sailed Elizabeth out on 5 February and burnt her under Fort Santa Cruz, at the entrance of Rio de Janeiro, in Guanabara Bay.

Juniper underwent repairs at Portsmouth in May-July 1813.

On 14 August 1813, Juniper, in company with President, Urgent, and Beagle, captured Marmion.

Juniper, Beagle, and Holly participated in the Siege of San Sebastián (7 July - 8 September 1813) as part of the fleet under Captain George Collier assigned to help Sir Arthur Wellesley's campaigns in Portugal and Spain. In 1847 the Admiralty authorized the issuance of the Naval General service Medal with clasp "St. Sebastian" to surviving participants in the campaign.

== Disposal ==
The "Principal Officers and Commissioners of His Majesty's Navy" offered the Juniper schooner, of 159 tons", for sale on 4 November. She sold on that date for £400.

== Post-script ==
On 30 August 1817 Diadem, Wells, master, was on her way from Jamaica to Saint John, New Brunswick, when two vessels stopped her and boarded her. The two were the brigantine Mexican Congress, under the independent flag, the schooner Juniper, under the Venezuelan flag.
