= Trelawney (1809 ship) =

UK merchant ship (1809–1819)

History

United Kingdom
- Name: Trelawney
- Launched: 1809, Whitby
- Fate: Wrecked 19 January 1819

General characteristics
- Tons burthen: 450, or 455 (bm)
- Length: 35 ft (10.7 m)
- Beam: 9 ft (2.7 m)
- Armament: 10 × 6-pounder guns

Trelawney was launched in 1809 at Whitby as a West Indiaman. She was wrecked on 22 January 1819.

== Career ==
Trelawney first appeared in Lloyd's Register (LR) in 1811. However, in 1810, Trelawny, Bogg, master, was already trading with Jamaica.

Year	Master	Owner	Trade	Source
1811	J.Boag; D.Reid	Sterling	Greenock–Jamaica	LR

== Loss ==
On 22 January 1819, Trelawney, Reid, master, was on her way from Greenock to Jamaica when she ran aground between Saltcoats and Irvin. Some of the cargo was saved. The location (55°37.5′N 4°45′W) was near Stevenston, in the Bay of Irvine, Firth of Clyde.

Nineteen people died in the wrecking, including four men who lost their lives in the rescue attempt. Ten people were saved – five seamen and the five passengers.
