= Siege of San Sebastián =

1813 siege during the Peninsular War

- Part of the Peninsular War
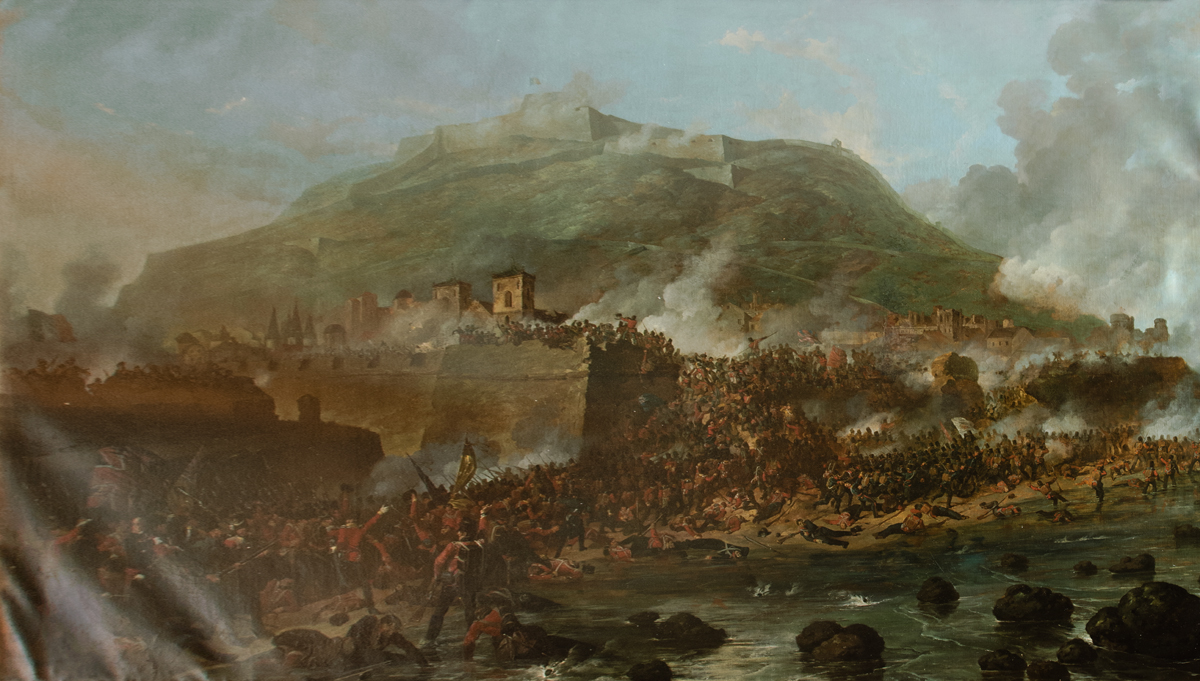
- The Storming of San Sebastian by Denis Dighton
Date	7 July – 8 September 1813
Location	San Sebastián, Basque Country, Spain 43.319°N 1.981°W
Result	French victory (1st siege); Anglo-Portuguese victory (2nd siege)

Belligerents
United Kingdom; Kingdom of Portugal	France

Commanders and leaders
(United Kingdom) Marquess of Wellington (United Kingdom) Sir Thomas Graham	(France) Louis Emmanuel Rey

Strength
9,750	3,380

Casualties and losses
1,200 killed 3,800 wounded 300 missing	1,900 killed or wounded 1,200 captured
- 1,000 civilians killed in post-battle sack

Peninsular War
Vitoria and the Pyrenees, 1813–1814
current battle

The siege of San Sebastián took place between 7 July and 8 September 1813, during the Peninsular War. Allied British and Portuguese forces under the command of Thomas Graham captured the city by assault after a lengthy siege, which followed a failed earlier siege and attack under the lead of Arthur Wellesley, Marquess of Wellington. The successful assault carried out by Graham forced the surrender of the defending French garrison under Louis Emmanuel Rey. Having broken into the town during the final assault, the allied soldiers rampaged out of control through San Sebastián, abusing and murdering many of its civilian inhabitants and setting fire to many of the city's buildings.

== Background ==
San Sebastián (Donostia in Basque), had 9,104 inhabitants at the time and was more liberal than the surrounding conservative province of Gipuzkoa. The town was open to different influences from Gascony and France in the north and Spain in the south. Moreover, the make-up of the town had been conspicuously mixed ethnic Gascon and Basque since its foundation, although the Gascon language may have died out already by this point in the town's history.

After Napoleon's takeover in France, his elder brother Joseph I was proclaimed king of Spain in 1808. Francisco Amorós, who is cited in many accounts as "French-minded", was then appointed chief magistrate of the town. While it seems that the new authorities and aides were not held in especially high regard by the population, peace prevailed throughout the period up to 1813, and French troops were generally well accepted. This balance swung when French troops retreating under Emmanuel Rey's command and refugees fleeing Vitoria after the French defeat arrived in the city in June.

== Forces ==
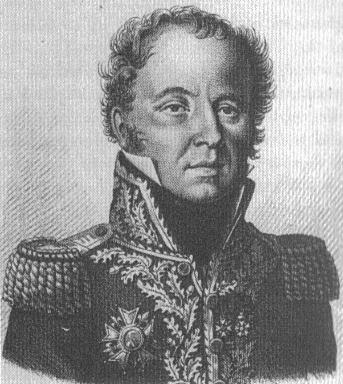
Louis Emmanuel Rey

On 1 July General of Brigade Rey's 3,170-man French garrison consisted of the 22nd and 34th Line (one battalion each), 62nd Line (two battalions), elements of the 1st and 119th Line, one company each of sappers and pioneers, and two companies of gunners. Seventy-six guns lined the fortifications.

To prosecute the siege, Lieut-Gen Sir Thomas Graham was given command of 9,000 troops from Maj-Gen John Oswald's 5th Division and Brig-Gen Henry Bradford's Portuguese brigade. Graham initially deployed 40 heavy guns from various sources.

According to Charles Oman (1902–1930), the 5th Division had 3,900 British officers and men and 2,300 Portuguese, with a further 2,300 Portuguese troops in Bradford's brigade. (Marching strengths 25 May 1813, minus Battle of Vitoria casualties.) Javier Sada has stated that the makeup of the allied troops investing the town included an important multinational share of soldiers of fortune, whose only incentive was the booty obtained in the conquered strongholds.

== Approaches ==
After winning the decisive Battle of Vitoria on 21 June 1813, Wellington's army advanced into the western Pyrenees to take the mountain passes and to face Marshal Soult's who had retreated back to France to try to reorganise his army. To clear his rear area, and to evict the last French forces from Spain, Wellington needed to take Pamplona and San Sebastián. Lacking resources to attack both simultaneously, Pamplona was blockaded and San Sebastián was put under siege.

The blockade of Pamplona took time, but resulted in the surrender of the French forces there due to starvation on 31 October 1813.

San Sebastián stands on a peninsula extending into the Bay of Biscay and runs generally north to south. The southern face of the city's fortifications was very strong with a large hornwork blocking the approaches with the higher town walls mounting guns that could fire over the hornwork to protect it. "It was the strongest fortification I ever saw, Gibraltar excepted", wrote William Dent. On its eastern side, the city was protected by the estuary of the Urumea River. British engineers detected a weak point near the riverfront at the city's southeastern corner. Assaults were possible across the river bed at low tide from both the south and the east. Breaching batteries could be placed south of the city and in sandhills on the east side of the estuary, which could themselves be protected from counterattack by the river.

British sea power could not be utilized because the Biscayan blockading fleet was understrength. French vessels regularly brought in supplies and reinforcements, while taking out wounded and sick soldiers. Because of this, Wellington could not expect to starve out the city. He would have to breach the walls and carry the city by assault.

== First siege ==
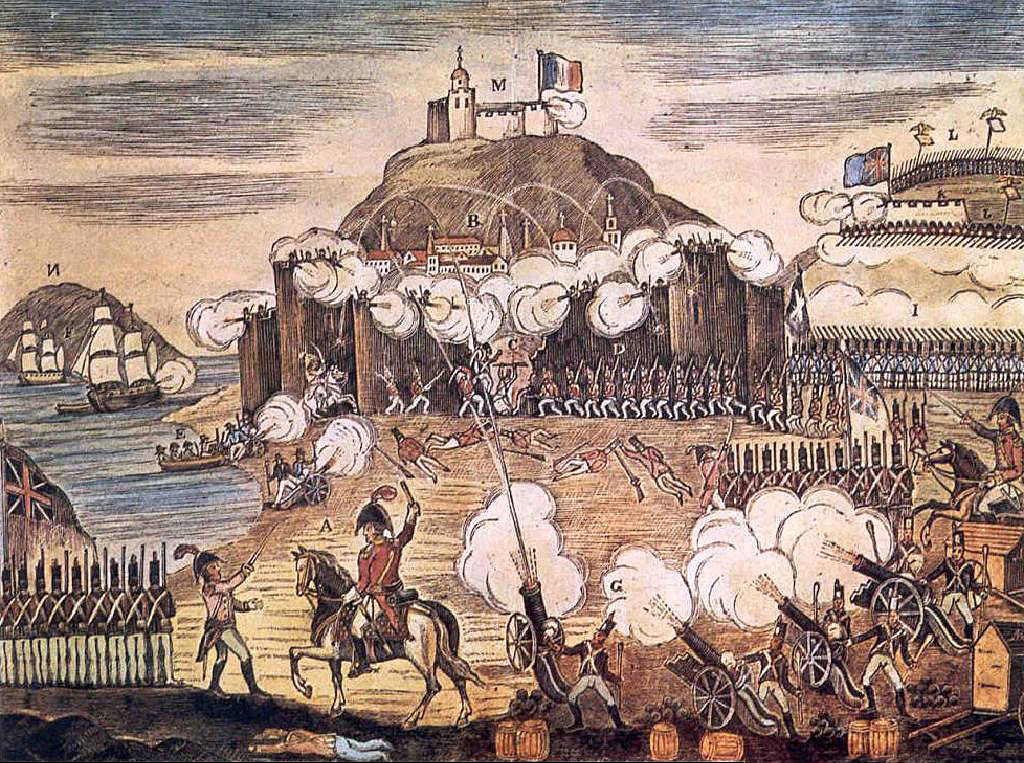
An engraving of the siege of San Sebastián (1813)

The first objective was the capture of a convent, on high ground, south of the hornwork. Work started on 11 July on two batteries 200 yards (180 m) from the convent, being completed and armed on the night of the 13/14 July. Continuous fire until 17 July reduced the convent to ruins, it was stormed and captured with no difficulties.

On 13 July work began on three batteries in sand dunes and a fourth on the hill of Mount Olia, all east of the river, at a range of 600 yards (550 m) and 1,300 yards (1,200 m), connected by trenches. Fire was commenced and continued day after day against the town walls and towers until by 23 July three breaches had been made.

The captured convent was engineered to protect it from the north and batteries constructed to fire on the hornwork and town. On 20/21 July a parallel trench was thrown across the peninsular midway to the hornwork, where it was discovered that a large drain ran underground to the hornwork. It was decided to mine the end of the drain.

An attack was to be launched at dawn on 25 July. Preceded by the explosion of the mine, troops would assault to hornwork mine breach and the two town wall breaches. The mine was exploded too early, when it was still dark; the troops attacked but could not get support from the artillery as it was too dark to see. The hornwork was assaulted but the follow-up troops were late arriving and the advance party were beaten back. The troops assaulting the walls were exposed to fire for 300 yards across the tidal flats. Although they reached the top of the breaches, the supports were again slow and they were beaten back with great loss of life, the British suffering 693 killed and wounded and 316 captured, including Harry Jones who was wounded while leading the forlorn hope, while Rey's garrison lost 58 killed and 258 wounded.

The assault having failed, the siege was reconsidered. Supplies of ammunition for the guns were running low, and on the same day, 25 July, Wellington learnt that Soult had launched an attack (which would become the Battle of the Pyrenees). The decision was to postpone the siege pending receipt of more supplies by ship, and Graham was ordered to remove his guns to ships at Pasaia.

During the intermission, the garrison made several sorties, taking 200 Portuguese soldiers as prisoners.

== Second siege ==
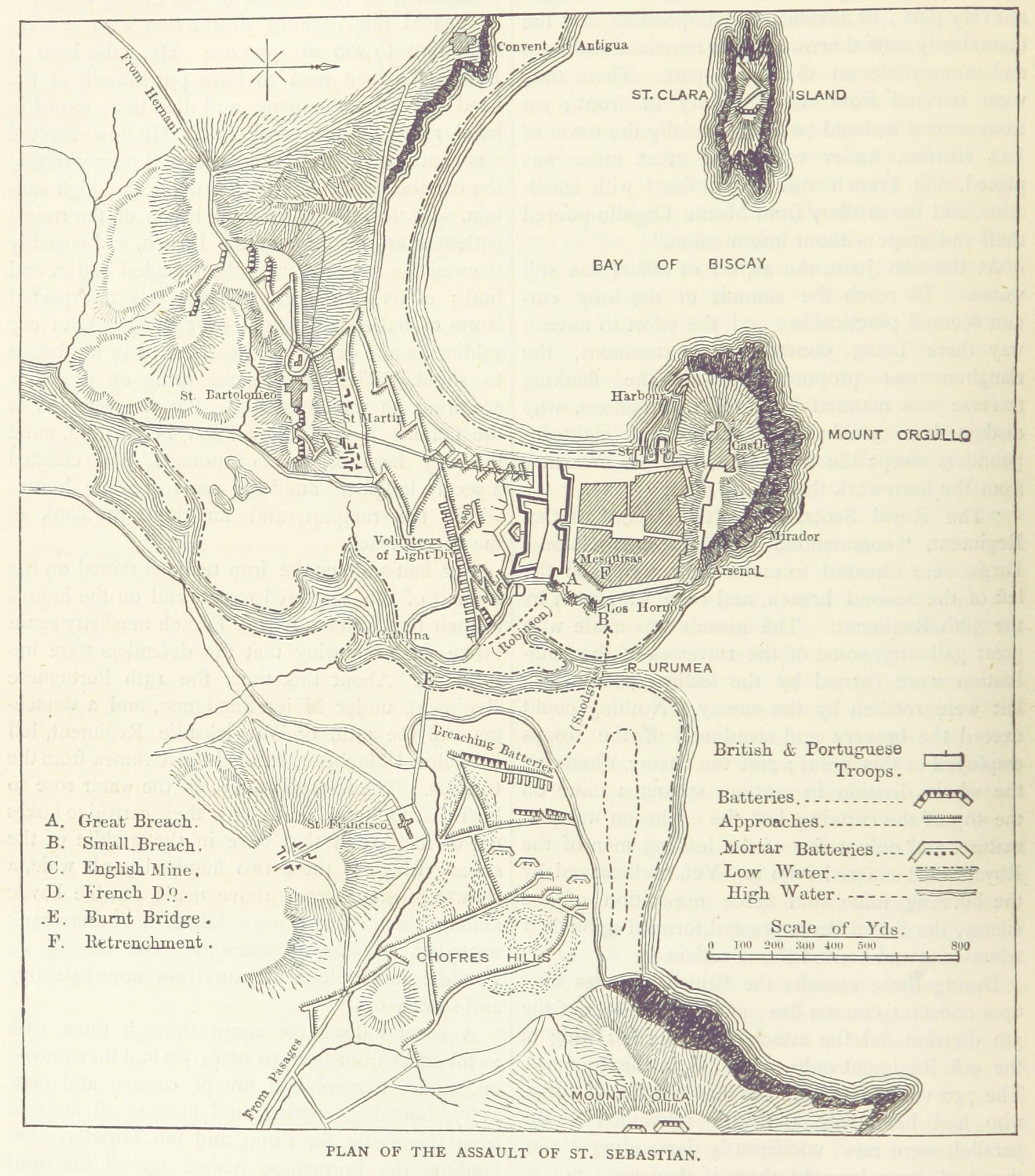
A British map of the siege

After driving Soult back across the frontier, Wellington waited until the rest of the battering train and sufficient supplies of shot had arrived from England before he again turned his attention to San Sebastián: even with the increased resources now available to him, Wellington could only mount one formal siege at a time, whilst it was decided to plump for San Sebastián on the grounds that it was weaker, more accessible and open to resupply by sea. By 15 August the French commander, Rey, had received some drafts from blockade running vessels but, even so, he only had 2,700 effective troops and 300 wounded in hospital.

British supplies started to arrive on 19 August, including additional engineering pioneers so that by 23 August the guns were ready to resume the offensive. By 26 August the British had established batteries for 63 pieces of artillery. On 26 August, 15 heavy cannon from the south and 48 guns from the east were blasting away, destroying towers and making more breaches in the walls.

On 27 August, 200 men from Beagle, Challenger, Constant, and Surveillante rowed into the bay to the west and after a brief fight and a handful of casualties, captured a small island, Santa Clara. The British then moved six guns from Surveillante on to the island to establish a battery to enfilade the town and the castle. The French were dismayed as they had thought the island's sides were too steep to assault. (Note: In 1847 the Admiralty authorized the issuance of the Naval General service Medal with clasp "St. Sebastian" to surviving seamen from the boats and from "such ships as may have been present during the months of August and September, and which were employed on the inner line of sea blockade.)

The main breach in the east wall was almost 500 feet (150 m) long with the towers at each end demolished. In the south a sap had been pushed forward to the glacis of the hornwork.

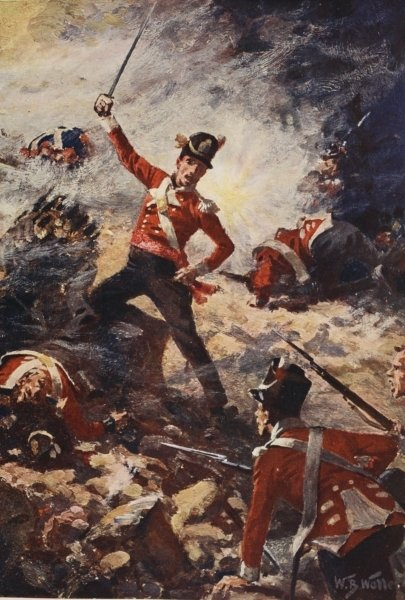
Colin Campbell leading the 'forlorn hope' at the siege of San Sebastián, 1813. Painting by William Barnes Wollen

Because the attack had to be made as the tide fell, it was scheduled for 11:00 am on 31 August. Another mine was exploded, which partly took down a wall, but also created a series of craters so that when the 5th Division made the assault from the south on the main breach. The soldiers dashed across the 180 yards (160 m) from the trenches through the craters to the foot of the breach with little loss, but then the French opened a terrific fire. Again and again the men of the 5th Division rushed up the rubble-strewn breach, but they were cut down in swathes.

The French had built a coupure (inner wall) that stopped the redcoats from breaking through the defences. Hundreds of British soldiers were killed. Graham committed 750 volunteers from the 1st, 4th, and Light Divisions, but they were unable to push back the French defenders. A Portuguese brigade splashed across the Urumea River and attacked the eastern breach, but their drive also stalled. After two hours, the assault was a costly failure. The survivors hugged the ground to avoid the fire.

After consulting with his artillery commander, Alexander Dickson, Graham chose to open fire on the coupure's inner wall, despite the risk of killing many British soldiers who lay close under the barrier. When the British heavy guns first fired over their heads, the survivors of the attack began to panic. But, when the smoke cleared, they saw that the big guns had wrecked most of the inner wall. They charged, reached the top of the breach, and spilled into the city. At the sight of their defence lines broken, the French retreated to the fortress on the hill of Urgull and by midday the besiegers had taken over the town.

On inspection it was discovered that not a single shot had fallen short into the allied troops, even though they were fired from 600–800 yards (550–730 m) for 20 minutes and that, aided by an explosion of ready grenades and live shells stored for use on the wall, few defenders survived uninjured. About 700 French were captured in the town which by now was in flames.

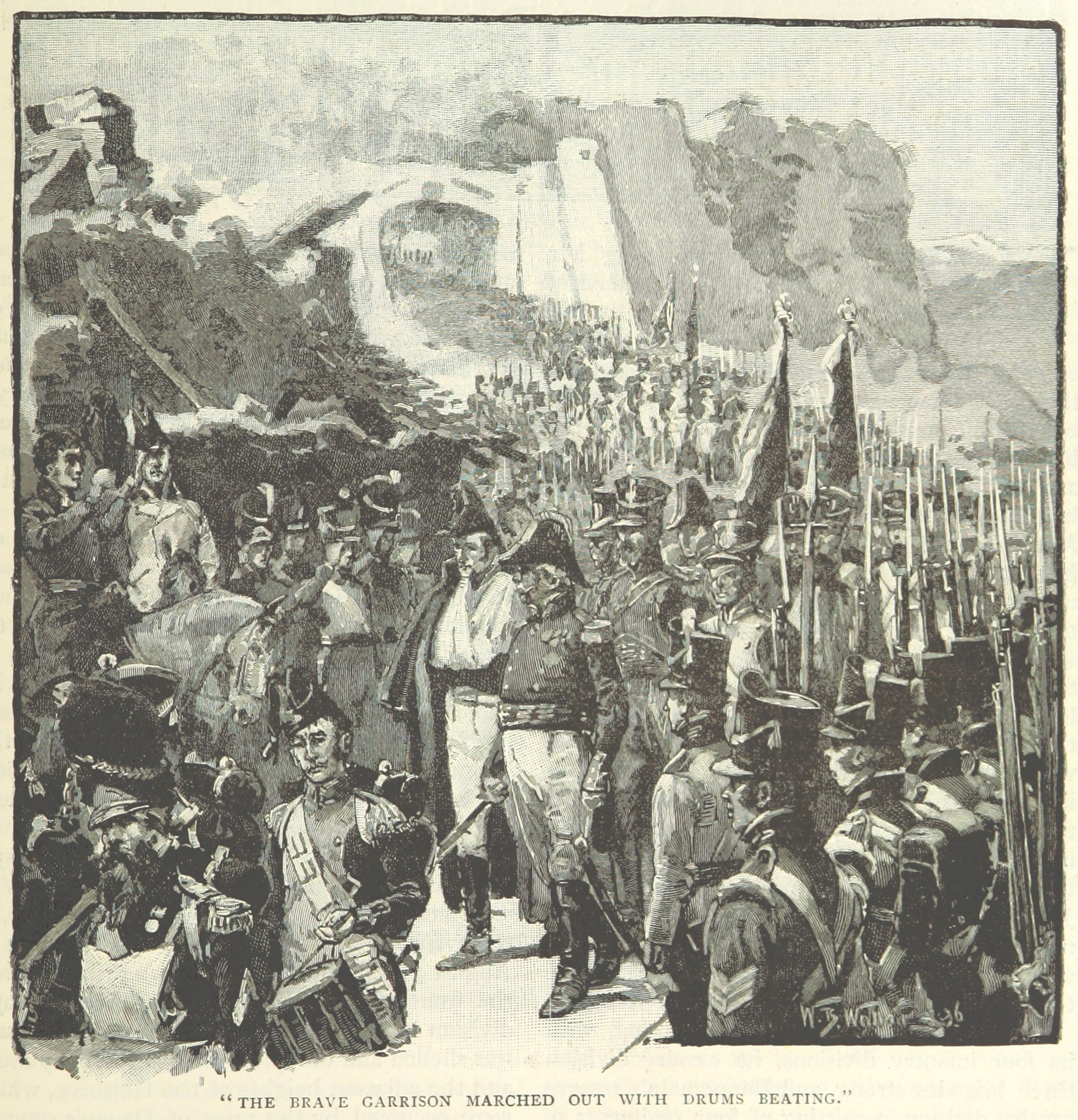
Rey and the garrison surrenders (from a British book)

Rey and the rest of his surviving garrison held out in the Castle until 5 September before asking for terms. The French commander formally surrendered on 8 September, and, in recognition of a noble defence, the remainder of the garrison stationed in the fortress was granted the honours of war by the Anglo-Portuguese forces. They marched out of the stronghold with shouldered arms, flags flying, to the sound of the drums. Their officers were permitted to retain their swords.

== Ransacking and burning ==
On entering the town, the victorious British and Portuguese troops quickly discovered plentiful supplies of brandy and wine in the shops and houses, with many soon becoming part of a "reeling, riotous mob". Drunken and enraged at the heavy losses they had suffered, the troops ran amok, sacking and burning the city while killing an unknown number of inhabitants, but they may amount to 1,000. According to Australian historian Philip G. Dwyer, around half of the town's population was killed. Some British officers tried to put a stop the actions of the soldiers but were either ignored or threatened by the drunken soldiers; others either turned a blind eye or joined in. Statements (75 reports) were gathered bearing witness to the events starting on 31 August. One of the survivors and witness Gabriel Serres claimed that, "[the attackers] committed the biggest atrocities, such as killing and injuring many inhabitants and also raping most of the women". The burning started that very night on some houses, according to local witnesses. Domingo de Echave, a local citizen, testified that he heard a British soldier pointing to flames coming out of a house and saying "See that house ablaze? Mind you, tomorrow all like this." The city kept burning for seven days, by which time only a handful of buildings survived the inferno. The rest of the city burned to the ground— 600 houses, except for 30 in Trinity street, present-day 31 August, selected by the attackers to host the British and Portuguese command.

After the battle, the town council and many survivors of the destruction held a meeting in Zubieta, where the residents of San Sebastián decided to reconstruct the town almost from scratch. Since the previous council had collaborated with the French, a new council was appointed, and a letter was written congratulating Wellington on his victory and requesting him that they be granted sums of money for those most in need. The demand was not met since Wellington refused to do so, and wholeheartedly wished in his reply that he not be addressed again. He went on to attribute the sack of the town to the French, and on 2 November while he was in Lesaka Wellington denied that British forces were involved in the burning of the city. In November a popular trial was arranged by the town council "on the atrocious behaviour shown by the British and Portuguese troops", where only two local women answered the questionnaire provided.

The burning of the town is remembered every year on August 31 with an extensive candlelit ceremony.

== Consequences ==
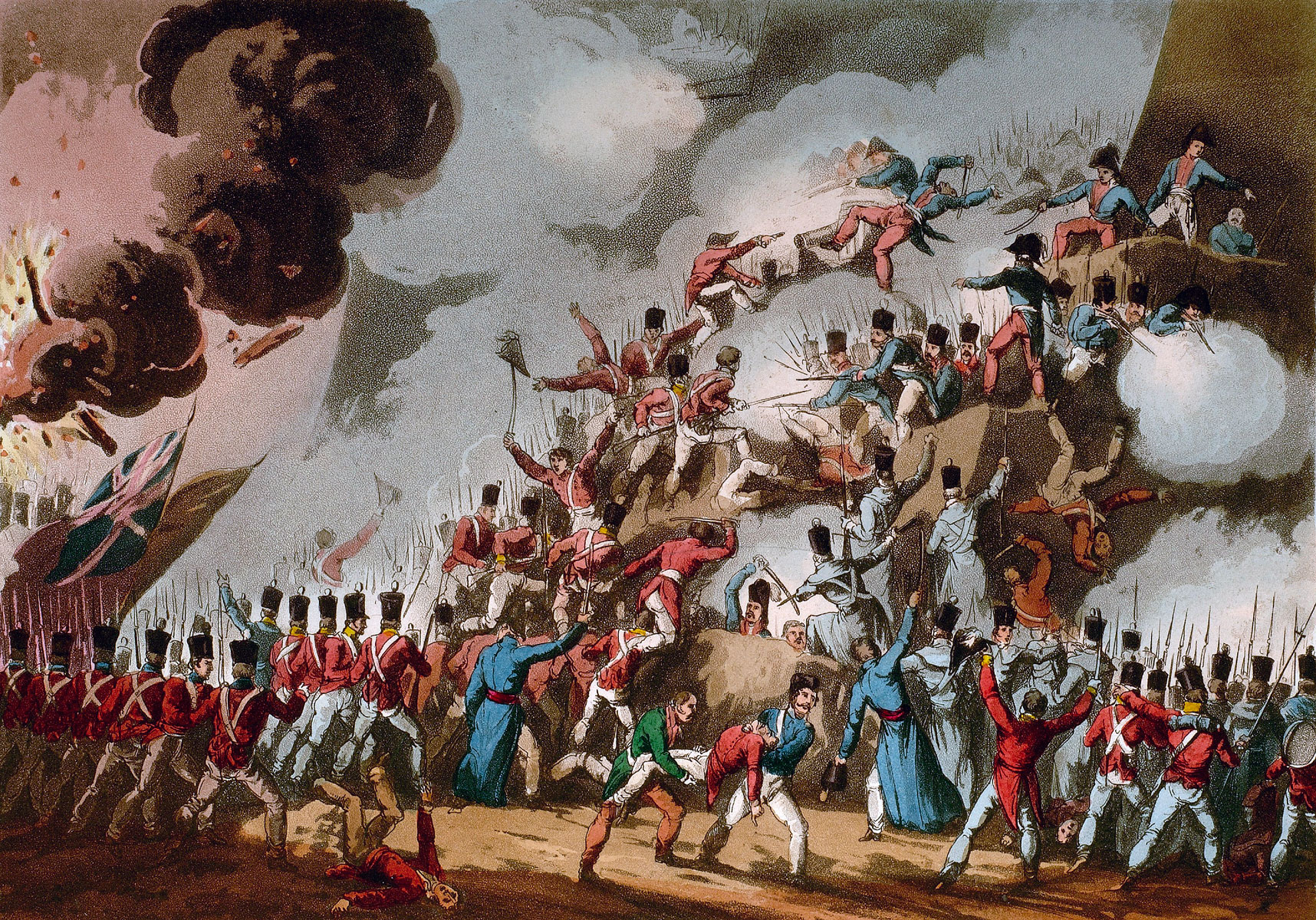
The Storming of San Sebastian

Of Rey's original garrison of 3,170 plus some later drafts, 850 were killed, 670 had been captured on 31 August and 1,860 surrendered, of whom 480 were sick and wounded. Graham's command lost 3,770 killed, wounded and missing. In the final assault, 867 men died, 1,416 fell wounded and 44 were listed as missing. Maj-Gen James Leith, who had just returned to command the 5th Division, was wounded in the assault. The chief engineering officer who laid out the Lines of Torres Vedras, Sir Richard Fletcher, was shot through the heart and killed in the siege, as was one of Harry Burrard's sons.

Not realizing he was too late to save San Sebastián, Soult launched a final attack on 31 August. Spanish forces repelled this attempt at the Battle of San Marcial. With the possession of San Sebastián, Wellington could focus on driving Soult back into France. The next action was the Battle of the Bidassoa on 7 October, followed by the Battle of Nivelle in November. The French garrison at Pamplona surrendered to the Spanish on 31 October.

== Notes ==
Preceded by Battle of Vitoria	Napoleonic Wars; Siege of San Sebastián	Succeeded by Battle of the Pyrenees
