= HMS Aid (1809) =

Napoleonic War-era storeship

History

United Kingdom
- Name: HMS Aid
- Laid down: July 1808
- Launched: 4 April 1809
- Renamed: HMS Adventure, 24 May 1821
- Fate: Sold 19 March 1853

General characteristics
- Class & type: Aid-class storeship
- Tons burthen: 313 68/94 (bm)
- Length: 105 ft 5 in (32.13 m) (overall); 87 ft 3 in (26.59 m)
- Beam: 26 ft (7.9 m)
- Depth of hold: 17 ft 4 in (5.28 m)
- Propulsion: Sails
- Complement: 39
- Armament: 4 × 12-pounder carronades + 2 × 9-pounder guns (as survey ship)

HMS Aid was a Royal Navy transport ship launched in 1809 at Kings Lynn. She was the name ship of a six-vessel class of purpose built storeships, the only vessels built as such during the Napoleonic Wars.

Ordered in 1808, she was built by Mr Thomas Brindley at King's Lynn, Norfolk.

She was converted to a survey ship between December 1816 and March 1817 at Sheerness. Commander William Henry Smyth commissioned her in January 1817.

On 14 September 1817, while under Smyth's command, she was at Lebida (Leptis Magna), together with HMS Weymouth. There they loaded columns, marbles, and other antiquities to bring back to England.

Aid was renamed HMS Adventure in 1821.

As HMS Adventure the ship was deployed for five years between 1826 and 1830 in a survey of Patagonia, under the command of Captain Phillip King. The ship was accompanied by HMS Beagle, a slightly smaller vessel (90.3 ft in length), who was on her first of three major voyages. Adventure was sold in Plymouth by the Admiralty on 19 May 1853 for £750.

== See also ==
- European and American voyages of scientific exploration
