= Shamrock-class schooner =

Class overview
- Name: Adonis class
- Operators: Royal Navy
- Preceded by: Cheerful class
- Succeeded by: Pygmy class
- Planned: 6
- Completed: 6
- Active: 1808—1816
- Lost: 4

General characteristics
- Tons burthen: 15032/94 (bm)
- Length: 78 ft 8 in (24.0 m); 60 ft 8 1/8 in (18.494 m)
- Beam: 21 ft 7 in (6.58 m)
- Draught: 7 ft 10 in (2.39 m)
- Complement: 50
- Armament: 2 × 6-pounder guns + 8 × 12-pounder carronades (last four had six carronades)
- Notes: All measurements are per design, not "as built"

The Shamrock class was a Royal Navy class of six 8 or 10-gun schooners built under contract in Bermuda during the Napoleonic War. The class was an attempt by the Admiralty to harness the expertise of Bermudian shipbuilders who were renowned for their fast-sailing craft. The Admiralty ordered all six vessels in February 1808.

The vessels were all constructed of Bermuda cedar. This durable, native wood, abundant in Bermuda, was strong and light, and did not need seasoning. Shipbuilders used it for framing as well as planking, which reduced vessel weight. It was also highly resistant to rot and marine borers, giving Bermudian vessels a potential lifespan of twenty years and more, even in the worm-infested waters of the Chesapeake and the Caribbean.

Of the six vessels in the class, four were lost to the perils of the sea; two survived to be sold in 1814 and 1815.

== Ships ==
Name	Launched	Fate
Shamrock	15 September 1808	Wrecked 23 February 1811
Thistle	27 September 1808	Wrecked 6 March 1811
Bramble	1809	Sold 14 December 1815
Holly	1809	Wrecked 29 January 1814
Juniper	1809	Sold 3 November 1814
Mistletoe	1809	Foundered 14 December 1816
