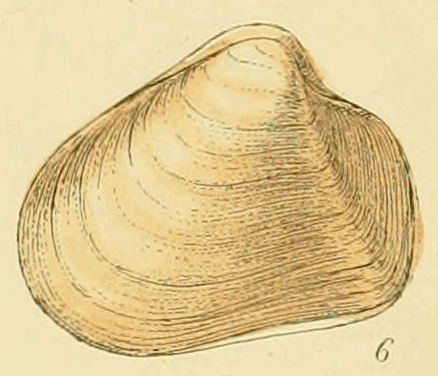
- Thracia convexa from the Illustrated Index of British Shells

Scientific classification
- Kingdom: Animalia
- Phylum: Mollusca
- Class: Bivalvia
- Superorder: Anomalodesmata
- Superfamily: Thracioidea
- Family: Thraciidae; Stoliczka, 1870

Genera
- 16 (see text)

= Thraciidae =

Family of molluscs

Thraciidae is a family of small marine bivalves in the superorder Anomalodesmata.

== Genera ==
The following 16 genera are included in the family Thraciidae:

- Asthenothaerus P. P. Carpenter, 1864
- Barythaerus B. A. Marshall, 2002
- Bushia Dall, 1886
- Cetothrax Iredale, 1949
- Cyathodonta Conrad, 1849
- Lampeia MacGinitie, 1959
- Parvithracia H. J. Finlay, 1926
- Pelopina M. Huber, 2010
- Phragmorisma Tate, 1894
- Pseudocyathodonta Coan, 1990
- Skoglundia Coan, 1990
- Thracia Blainville, 1824
- Thracidentula Garrard, 1961
- Thracidora Iredale, 1924
- Thraciopsis Tate & May, 1900
- Trigonothracia G. Yamamoto & Habe, 1959
