= Amity (1801 ship) =

Ship

History

United Kingdom
- Name: Amity
- Owner: Warran & Co.
- Builder: Mistley, near Colchester
- Launched: 1801
- Fate: Sold August 1803

United Kingdom
- Name: HMS Inspector
- Acquired: 1803 by purchase
- Fate: Sold 1810

United Kingdom
- Name: Amity
- Owner: 1810: Ward & Co.
- Acquired: By purchase 1810
- Fate: Last listed 1833

General characteristics
- Tons burthen: 248, or 24931/94, or 250, or 257 (bm)
- Length: Overall:96 ft 5 in (29.4 m); Keel:74 ft 6 in (22.7 m)
- Beam: 25 ft 1 in (7.6 m)
- Depth of hold: 10 ft 6 in (3.2 m)
- Sail plan: Ship-sloop
- Complement: 80 (Royal Navy)
- Armament: Royal Navy:14 × 24-pounder carronades; 1811:6 × 12-pounder carronades

HMS Inspector was launched in 1801 at Mistley as the mercantile Amity. The Royal Navy purchased her in 1803 and named her HMS Inspector. The Navy laid her up in 1808 before selling her in 1810. She then returned to mercantile service. Between 1818 and 1825 she made four voyages as a whaler in the British southern whale fishery. She returned to mercantile service and was last listed in 1833 as being at Falmouth.

== Merchantman ==
Amity was launched in 1801 at Mistley, near Colchester. She first appeared in Lloyd's Register in 1801 with T. Gamble, master, Warran & Co., owner, and trade London–Saint Petersburg.

== Royal Navy ==
The Royal Navy purchased Amity in August 1803. She then underwent fitting for naval service at Deptford between 5 September and 10 November. Commander Edward Mitchell commissioned her in September. On 11 November she, together with Eagle, Majestic, Princess of Orange, Raisonable, Africiane, Glatton, Beaver, the hired armed cutter Swift, and the hired armed lugger Agnes, shared in the capture of Upstalsboom, H.L. De Haase, Master. (Note: The prize money for a seaman was 10d.) On 19 May 1804 HMS Galgo and Inspector cooperated in an unsuccessful attempt to cut out the pram Ville d'Anvers from Ostend. then on 23 June, Galgo and Inspector observed 26 schuyts coming from Ostend and going towards Flushing. They proceeded to keep up a running fire on these vessels for about two hours, while enduring fire from shore batteries. Eventually, the two British vessels hauled off, fearful of running aground on the Stroom sand, having succeeded in driving only one Dutch vessel aground, but having sustained no casualties themselves.

She arrived on 6 August 1804 at North Yarmouth, together with the armed defense ship Chapman and the gun-brig HMS Censor. Commander Mitchell reported on 14 May 1805 that HMS Musquito had captured the French privateer Orestes and sent her into Yarmouth. Orestes was a Dutch-built dogger armed with a 24-pounder gun and six swivels, and had a crew of 33 men.

Commander Henry Butt replaced Mitchell in May 1805. Commander Edward Killwick replaced Butt, and then Commander Brian Hodgson replaced Killwick. In March 1808 Inspector was laid up at Chatham.

Disposal: The "Principal Officers and Commissioners of His Majesty's Navy" offered the sloop Inspector, lying at Chatham, for sale on 25 June 1810. She sold there on that date.

== Merchantman ==
Ward & Co. purchased Inspector and returned her to her name of Amity She re-entered Lloyd's Register in 1810 with Fraser, master, and trade London-based transport. The Register of Shipping for 1811 gave her master's name as J. Frazier.

In 1815 Amity had damages repaired. In 1818 her master changed from Ayres to Lancashire, and her trade from Liverpool–Philadelphia to London–Southern Fishery.

== Whaler ==
Between 1818 and 1825 Amity made four voyages as a whaler. Captain Langcaster or Lancashire sailed Amity from London on 12 September 1818 on her first whale hunting voyage. It is not clear when she returned, but in 1819 she had damages repaired. On her second whaling voyage Captain Baker sailed Amity from London on 21 March 1820. She returned on 30 March 1821 with 600 casks of whale oil. On her third whaling voyage Captain Baker sailed from London on 23 May 1821, bound for the Pacific Ocean. At some point in 1821 Baker died. Captain Murry sailed Amity back to London arriving on 22 March 1823 with 430 casks of whale oil and with fins (baleen). Amity left on her last recorded whaling voyage on 11 June 1823. For this voyage her owner was Birnie. Captain Reynolds returned on 3 May 1825 with 220 casks of whale oil, two tanks, and fins.

== Merchantman ==
Both Lloyd's Register and the Register of Shipping carried stale data into their 1827 issues. However, in the 1827 issue of the Register of Shipping the Supplement carried an update. It showed Amity with Robinson as master and owner, and her trade as London–Memel. It also showed her undergoing repairs in 1825 and damage repairs in 1827.

On 1 November 1825, Amity, Robinson, master, was returning to Britain from Memel when she with difficulty rescued the eight man crew of the cutter Star. Star was a tender to HMS Investigator and both had been caught in the gales that were wreaking havoc along the coasts in the North Sea. Star was in a waterlogged state and her crew abandoned their vessel.

Lloyd's Register for 1829 still carried stale data, but also showed her master as having changed in 1826 from Reynolds to J. Rutter, and her owner as having changed from T. Ward to Robinson. However, it still showed Amity as sailing in the Southern Whale Fishery. Amity last appears in the Register of Shipping in 1830, still with Robinson as master and owner, and still with London–Memel as her trade. From 1830 to 1833 Lloyd's Register showed Amity with Reynolds, master, J. Robinson, owner, and trade Falmouth. Also, for some time Lloyd's Register had been giving her build year as 1796.
