= French ship Sans Culotte =

Seven ships of the French Navy have borne the name Sans-Culotte in honour of the Sans-culottes:

== Naval ships named Sans-Culotte ==
- Orient, an Océan-class 118-gun ship of the line of the French Navy, initially named Dauphin Royal. Famous for her role as flagship of the French fleet at the Battle of the Nile in August 1798, where she blew up spectacularly. She was launched at Toulon in 1791 and was briefly named Sans Culotte before being named Orient.
- Sans-Culotte (1793), an aviso. Also called Petite Sans Culotte, she was a 2-gun tartane, or possibly brig-rigged aviso, launched at Toulon in July 1793 that the Royal Navy captured in August 1793 at Toulon and took into service as HMS Petite Victoire. She was lost off Cap Corse in early 1794.
- Sans-Culotte (1793–1794), a 22-gun corvette. She was initially a merchant brig that the French Navy purchased at Pointe-à-Pitre, Martinique, in August 1793. HMS Blanche captured her on 9 October 1794.
- Sans-Culotte (1795), a brigantine. In service at Toulon in July 1793, the British and Spaniards captured her at Toulon in August 1793. The French Navy recaptured her in December. She was renamed Soigneux in May 1795, but struck later that year.
- Fortune (1795–1799), a xebec, was launched as Sans-Culotte. A British privateer captured her off Cargese on 3 September 1799.
- Sans-Culotte (1795), an 18-gun corvette. She served in the Caribbean, where HMS Mermaid captured her in September 1795 and scuttled her by burning.
- Sans Abus (1795), a transport ship, was renamed Sans-Culotte on 30 May 1795. Commissioned in the Antilles, she was pierced for 18 guns but carrying only two 3-pounder guns (Demerliac says 2 × 3-pounders), and was in service at Brest in 1795. HMS Aimable captured and burned her on 22 September 1795 off La Désirade.
Ships of the French Navy named Sans-Culotte
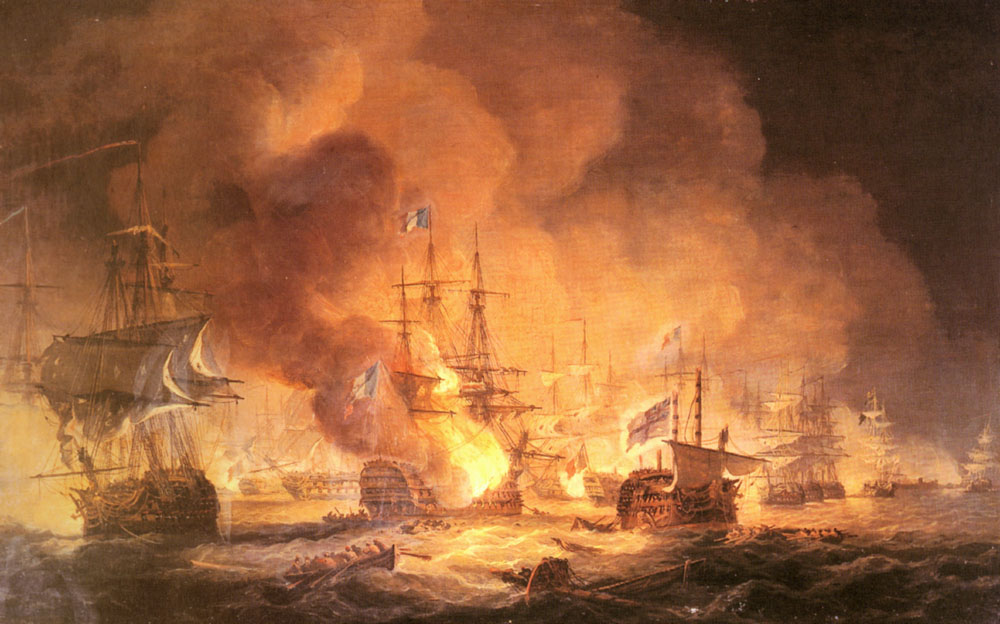
Explosion of Orient

== Non-naval ships named Sans-Culotte ==
- Sans-Culotte, a privateer from Dunkerque. Commissioned under Charles-Noël Baclin in 1793, she was an 86-ton ship of 8 guns and 43 men. The British frigate HMS Venus, in company with HMS Nymph, captured a Sans Culotte on 24 May 1793.
- Sans-Culotte, a privateer from Honfleur, commissioned in 1793.
- Sans-Culotte, a 15-ton and 20-man privateer from Saint-Malo, commissioned in 1793 under Captain Eudes. HMS Spider captured her in mid-March 1793.
- Sans-Culotte, a privateer from Morlaix, commissioned in 1793 under Pierre Long. Possibly the vessel the 8-gun hired armed cutter Rose captured in July 1796.
- Sans-Culotte, a privateer from Brest, commissioned in February 1793 under Jean-Baptiste Brice, with 8 guns and between 50 and 81 men.
- Sans Culottes [sic], a French privateer schooner that HMS Orion captured on 25 August 1793.
- Sans-Culotte, a privateer chasse-marée from Nantes, commissioned in December 1796 under François Aregnaudeau. Aregnaudeau would disappear in 1812 while captain of the privateer Duc de Dantzig.
- Sans-Culotte, a privateer from Marseille, commissioned in 1793. Possibly the vessel that the 8-gun hired armed cutter Rose captured in July 1796; this is improbable as Rose was probably operating in the Channel, not the Mediterranean.
- Sans-Culotte, a privateer of unknown homeport, operating in the Caribbean that HMS Blanche captured on 19 October 1794.
- Sans-Culotte, a privateer from Île de France (now Mauritius), commissioned in October 1794. A brig of the same name, used as a slave ship in 1796, might be identified with this ship. She could also possibly be the Sans-Culotte the hired armed cutter Rose captured in July 1796; this too is improbable.

== Naval ships with close names ==
- Sans-Culotide (1794), a 22-gun corvette. Launched as Heureuse, she was renamed Sans-Culotine after the Sansculottides in March 1794, Sans-Culotide in August, and Soucieuse on 30 May 1795. Used as a powder hulk in Brest from 1804 and broken up in 1816.
- Brave Sans Culotte (or Petit Sans-Culotte) was a xebec commissioned in May 1793 or purchased in July 1793 at Toulon. She had a crew of 100 men (5 or 6 officers and 95 men) and carried 14 × 6-inch guns. The British and Spanish captured her at Toulon in August 1793, but the French Navy recaptured her there in December. She was renamed Citoyen on 30 May 1795, and struck at Toulon in December 1795.

== Non-naval ships with close names ==
- Brave Sans Culotte, a privateer from Marseille commissioned in 1793.
- Sans-Culotte de Jemmapes, a 6-gun privateer lugger, commissioned in Dieppe in February 1793 under David Drouault.
- Sans-Culotte marseillais, a 100-ton ship from Marseille commissioned as a privateer in Nantes in March 1793 under Julien (or Joseph) Molinary, with 10 guns and 86 men.
- Sans-Culotte nantais, a 100-ton privateer commissioned in Nantes in February 1793 under Pierre-Édouard Plucket (or Plunckett), with 12 guns, 11 officers and 135 men. She served under Tayer later in 1793, and under Joseph Molinari (or Molinary), arriving in Philadelphia in July 1793. Captured by HMS Blanche on 28 or 30 December 1793. British records refer to her as Sans Culotte, and give the date of capture as 28 December 1793.
- Sans-Culotide (or Sans-Culotine), a privateer from Santo Domingo commissioned in February 1797.

== Other ships to reconcile with above ==
- Sans Culotte was a merchant ship built in New England that the French captured in September 1793. She was commissioned as a privateer in Bordeaux in February 1793, cruising under Captain Polony in October. That month, the Navy requisitioned her and commissioned her as an aviso. She was armed with eight 4-pounder guns, six obusiers, and 10 swivel guns. She was renamed Fortuné in May 1795 and sold in June 1797 at Lorient.
- Culotte was an aviso commissioned at Genoa in April 1799. The Royal Navy captured her in May 1799 near Sardinia.

In addition to these naval vessels, several privateers and merchant vessels also bore the name Sans Culotte.

- HMS Scourge, of 16 guns, but with only six 6-pounders mounted, and a crew of 79 men under the command of Captain George Brisac, was off Scilly on 13 March 1793 when she captured the French privateer Sans Culotte, of eight 8-pounder guns and four 12-pounder carronades, and 81 men. In the engagement, the British lost one man killed and one wounded; the French lost nine killed and 20 wounded.
- HMS Cerberus captured the privateer cutter Hirondelle (ex-Sans Culotte) on 5 November 1796. Hirondelle had a crew of 63 men and was armed with ten 6-pounder guns, of which she had thrown six overboard during the chase. She was probably a privateer from Granville.
