= French corvette Jalouse (1794) =

Jalouse
History

France
- Name: Jalouse
- Namesake: French, meaning jealous, suspicious, or wary
- Builder: Pierre, Jacques, and Nicholas Fortier, Honfleur
- Laid down: July 1793
- Launched: 4 February 1794
- Captured: 13 May 1797

Great Britain
- Name: HMS Jalouse
- Acquired: 13 May 1797 by capture
- Fate: Broken up, March 1807

General characteristics
- Class & type: Belliqueuse-class 18-gun brig-corvette
- Displacement: 475 tons (French)
- Tons burthen: 34847/94 (bm), or 220-280 (French; "of load")
- Length: 102 ft 10 in (31.3 m) (overall); 85 ft 4 in (26.0 m) (keel)
- Beam: 278 ft 9 in (85.0 m)
- Depth of hold: 12 ft 11 1/2 in (3.9 m)
- Sail plan: Brig
- Complement: French service: Originally:116-140; At capture:153; British service:121
- Armament: French service; Originally:6 × 24-pounder guns + 2 smaller guns; At capture:12 × long 12-pounder + 4 × 6-pounder guns; British service: 18 × 6-pounder guns + 2 × 24-pounder carronades added

Jalouse was an 18-gun Belliqueuse-class brig-corvette of the French Navy, built to a design by Pierre-Alexandre-Laurent Forfait, and launched in 1794, at Honfleur. The Royal Navy captured her in May 1797, and took her into service under her existing name. In British service she served primarily on the North Sea station where she captured three small French privateers, and many Dutch merchant vessels. She also participated with other British warships in two or three major cutting-out expeditions. She was broken up in 1807.

== French service ==
Between 24 March 1794 and 25 August, Jalouse was at Le Havre and Ostend, and under the command of lieutenant de vaisseau Astague.

On 5 October 1795, lieutenant de vaiseau Pierre-Édouard Plucket took command of Jalouse. At the time she was armed with 12 guns, and had a crew of 150 men.

Under Plucket's command, Jalouse in a 15-day cruise in 1795, captured seven prizes and 52 men.

From 7 March 1797, until her capture, French official records confirm that Jalouse was still under Plucket's command, and based at Flessingue. From there she cruised the North Sea, and arrived at Bergen. Sailing from Bergen, she captured three prizes, including a whaler of eight guns and 42 men. Plucket also burnt three vessels under the guns of a fort at Berwick.

On 27 March, or 7 April (records differ), Jalouse encountered the sloop Tisiphone in the North Sea. An inconclusive 11-hour engagement ensued.

Afterwards Plucket reported that he had engaged a 38-gun frigate; (Note: Supposedly, Tisiphone carried sixteen 18-pounder carronades and twenty-two 12-pounder guns. It is not clear what the source of this information is as the only Tisiphone to serve the Royal Navy was the sloop of fourteen 18-pounder carronades and two 6-pounder guns, with a crew of 121.) according to a French account, Captain James Wallis of Tisiphone reported that he had engaged a 28-gun frigate. Supposedly, when Plucket's English prisoners from prizes returned to Britain and reported that Jalouse was a 12-gun brig, Wallis was court-martialed and reduced in rank. There seems to be only passing mention of the engagement in one English-language source that makes no mention of a court martial and that identifies Tisiphone's opponent as the privateer Naïade. (Note: The British may have confused Jalouse with Naïade which was a naval vessel operating out of Flessingue and in the North Sea at the same time. If so, it is not clear why Wallis would have referred to her as having 28 guns; Naïade was of the same force (armament) as Jalouse. (Note: there is no record of a contemporary privateer Naïade.))

After the engagement with Tisiphone, Jalouse returned to Bergen. There Plucket replenished her store of munitions, recruited 20 Dutch sailors to rebuild his crew, and then set out for Flessingue. On the way she captured two more British vessels.

== Capture ==
Vestal, under the command of Captain Charles White, captured Jalouse at about 5a.m. on 13 May 1797, near Elsinor after a chase of about nine hours and running about 84 hours. For an hour and a half during the chase Jalouse fired her stern chasers, two long 12-pounder guns. White was able to bring Vestal alongside Jalouse and fired three broadsides before she struck, having suffered great damage to her masts and rigging. At the time of capture, Jalouse had 16 guns, though she was pierced for 20, and had shifted some guns to the vacant ports. Her armament consisted of twelve "very long 12-pounders", and four 6-pounder guns. Her commander, "C. Plucket", had a crew of 153 men, two of whom were killed and five of whom were wounded. Vestal suffered no casualties. Vestal brought Jalouse into the Humber.

The British took their French prisoners back to England. Plucket managed to escape and return to France. The court martial for the loss of Jalouse then acquitted him.

== British service ==
Jalouse underwent fitting out at Deptford between 24 July and 16 October 1797. Commander John Temple commissioned Jalouse in September 1797, for the North Sea.

Jalouse's first documented capture was the merchant vessel Gerrit Hendrick Groote, which Jalouse captured on 7 May 1798. Later that month, on 25 May, Jalouse captured Mercurius, which was condemned as droit of Admiralty.

In June and July, Jalouse captured Zeelust, Antonella, Anna, and Surprize.

On 22 February 1799, Jalouse captured Hermina. The next dayJalouse was off the Texel when she captured the French privateer brig Jason. Jason, of Dunkirk, was armed with 14 guns and had a crew of 52 men. (Note: Jason was a privateer commissioned in Dunkirk in 1797. On her first cruise in 1797 until November she was under the command of Pierre-François Sagot, with 51 men and 14 guns. On her second cruise, in 1798 she was under the command of a J.-J. (Jean-Jacques?) Seille, with 58 men and 14 guns. For her third, and last cruise in 1799, she was under the command of Charles-Adrien Parquet until Jalouse captured her.)

Lieutenant Dawes, of the hired armed cutter Phoenix arrived at Yarmouth Roads on 9 March with intelligence from the Haak Sands at the mouth of the Texel. He reported that he had observed 20 enemy vessels moored as they had been all winter. He further reported that Jalouse was always on site, so that Temple would readily observe any enemy activity. Dawes also brought with him a letter from Temple stating that prisoners from Jason had reported that 15,000 troops in France were to march to Holland to be embarked on transports.

Jalouse was in company on 10 April, with the hired armed cutters Nancy and Phoenix. They shared the proceeds of the capture of the brig Maria. Two days later Jalouse and Nancy captured Unvernkorff. Two days after that, Jalouse and Nancy recaptured Friendship.

Jalouse and Hound recaptured the cutter Rover on 10 May. On 4 June, Circe and Jalouse recaptured the sloop Ceres. Jalouse recaptured both off the coast of Norway and sent them into Yarmouth. Rover had been sailing from Riga to Hull when captured, and Ceres, of Berwick, had been sailing from Leith to London. (Note: The prize money notice in the London Gazette gives the year of Rover's recapture as 1800, but this would be a typo. Lloyd's List reports on both Rover and Ceres in the same news item in June 1799.)

During the night of 27 June, Temple and Captain James Boorder of Espiegle volunteered to cut out some Dutch gunboats lying at the back of the island of Ameland, so Capt. Winthrop of Circe ordered Pylades, Jalouse, Espiegle, and Tisiphone to join him in anchoring as close to the shore as possible in order to assist them. When the British boats arrived, they found that their targets were pulled up on shore where the cutting out party could not reach them. The British instead took out 12 merchant vessels, six with cargoes and six in ballast, and retreated. There were no British casualties, even though Dutch shore batteries fired on the attackers. A later prize money notice identified some of the Dutch vessels as Twee Gebroders (Dirks, master), Twee Gebroders (Jansen, master), Jonge Evert, Vrow Regina, Anna Elizabeth, Vrow Trentje, and four fishing vessels. (Note: The prize money to an able seaman on Jalouse or Tisiphone amounted to £1 13s 6d.)

Then on 10 July, Jalouse was a part of a small squadron consisting also of Espiegle, Courier, Pylades, and the hired armed cutter Nancy, all under Winthrop's command in Circe. The boats of the squadron rowed for 15 or 16 hours into the Watt at the back of Ameland. There they captured three merchant vessels carrying sugar, wine, and brandy, and destroyed a galliot loaded with ordnance and stores.

On 24 November 1799, Admiral Lord Duncan sent Jalouse to find a privateer that had been operating off the coast. Jalouse encountered the privateer on the 29th that struck after a chase of five hours. She was a brand new, copper-bottomed lugger called Fantasie, of 14 guns and 60 men. Temple was able to rescue the four masters and 35 seamen of four laden colliers that the privateer had taken the previous day close in to Flamborough Head. He then went off towards Ostend in pursuit of the prizes and on the 30th he retook Sally, of Lynn. Jalouse brought Fantasie into Harwich.

On Saturday 5 April 1800, Jalouse took the small French privateer cutter Inattendu. She was armed with two guns and small arms, and had a crew of 25 men. She had captured nothing since leaving Ostend the previous Wednesday.

A month later, on 4 and 5 May, Jalouse was among the vessels that captured 12 outward-bound Greenland ships. The other British naval vessels included the hired armed cutters Fox, and Marechal de Cobourg, and Cruizer, though most were much larger and included Monmouth, Glatton, Ganges, Director, and America, among others. Also on 5 May, Jalouse captured Johanna Eleonora, Malmberg, master, and Luste en Friede, Straud, master.

On 13 May, Jalouse captured Vrouw Etje, De Haan, Augustina, and De Brock.

In 1801, the Honorable Frederick Paul Irby took command of Jalouse, then operating in the North Sea.

Jalouse, under Irby's command, recaptured the sloop Friends, of Airth on 3 February. Four days later Jalouse recaptured the brig Providence, of Sunderland. The privateer Victoire had captured Providence and Jalouse had to cut Providence out of Norway. (Note: Victoire was probably the Victoire, of Dunkirk, of 45-tons (French; tonneaux/"of load"), and 14 guns. She had a crew of 60 men under the command of Ensign Jean-Louis Fromentin.)

Jalouse, while under Irby's command, was instrumental in saving Narcissus when Narcissus was driven ashore on the coast of Holland. Irby's youngest brother, Charles Leonard Irby, was a midshipman on board Narcissus, having joined her on 23 May.

Jalouse and Marshal de Cobourg, together or singly, captured several Dutch vessels between 22 and 24 July:

Negotie and Zeeward (22 July; Jalouse and Marshal de Cobourg)
Hoop (same)
Jusfrouw Dirkje (23 July; Jalouse and Marshal de Cobourg)
Hoffnung (24 July; Jalouse)
Fortuna (Jaloufe)

On 31 July, Jalouse and Lynx captured Brockmerlust, with the capture of Neptunus following on 1 August. The next day Jalouse and Lynx captured Vrow Caterine.

Squirrel, Lynx, and Driver captured three ships on 6 September: Snelle, Jager, and Engesende. Jalouse shared in the proceeds by agreement with Lynx and Driver.

On 26 September, Jalouse captured the dogger Fortuna.

Squirrel, Driver, Bittern, and Jalouse shared in the proceeds of the capture on 5 October, of Carolina Wilhelmina.

Jalouse also captured smugglers. On 25 March 1802, she seized a "Tub Boat and Quantity of Spirits".

Irby received promotion to post captain on 14 April 1802. Commander Christopher Strachey then replaced him on the 29th. Jalouse continued to operate off Calais.

On 19 May 1803, Jalouse, under Strachey's command, captured Jong Jan Pieter. Jalouse shared the prize money with Grampus and the gun-brigs Censor and Vixen, with whom she had been in company. (Note: A later notice gave the prize's name as Yonge John and Peter.) Lloyd's List reported that Grampus and Jalouse had sent into the Downs a large Dutch ship from Surinam bound for Rotterdam. That same day Jalouse also captured Deux Freres. Two days later Jalouse captured Speculation.

The frigate Immortalité, together with Jalouse and Cruizer, captured two French gun-vessels, the schooner Inabordable and the brig Commode on 14 June 1803, after the French vessels had run themselves ashore under the protection of the guns of a shore battery at Cap Blanc Nez near Sangatte. After about an hour's firing by the British warships, and the French batteries and gun-vessels, the boats of the three British ships were able to take possession and refloat the two gun-vessels. Each of the French gun-vessels was armed with three 24-pounder guns and one 8-pounder gun. The only casualty was one man from Jalouse, who was badly wounded. Later reports described the two French vessels as gun-brigs, and gave their names as Inabordable and Mechanté. The Royal Navy did not take either into service. (Note: Both were Ardente-class chaloupes-canonnièr of 130 tons (French) displacement. Mechanté was under the command of enseigne de vaisseau Vanier, and was on her way from Boulogne-sur-Mer to Dunkerque. She had been launched 17 June 1793, at Boulogne; Inabordable had been launched 12 August 1793 at Calais.)

On 10 July, Jalouse was at Syracuse, Sicily.

Lucius Curtis received promotion to commander on 16 November 1804, and assumed command of Jalouse, then in the Mediterranean Fleet, later that month.

A convoy from Smyrna arrived at Malta on 2 January 1805, and the convoy left for England on 4 January. Jalouse had escorted the convoy from Smyrna and she continued on as an escort as far as western Sicily. In June 1805, Curtis commissioned Rose at Portsmouth. (Note: Readily available records do not reveal who commanded Jalouse between Curtis's departure and her return to Britain to be paid off.)

In an enclosure to a letter dated 7 October 1805, Admiral Lord Nelson wrote, "Jalouse, Childers, and Merlin being unfit for the service of this Country, are ordered home with the first Convoy to be repaired".

== Fate ==
Merlin and Childers went on to serve for some more time. However, Jalouse was paid off in May 1806. She was then broken up at Woolwich in March 1807.
