= Hired armed cutter Marechal de Cobourg =

Variously-named cutter to brig

His Majesty's hired armed vessel Marechal de Cobourg served the British Royal Navy under contract during the French Revolutionary Wars. Contemporary records also referred to her as Marshall de Cobourg, Marshall Cobourg, Marshall Cobourg, Marquis Cobourg, Marquis de Cobourg, Cobourg, Coborg, and Saxe Cobourg. Further adding to the difficulty in tracking her through the records, is that although she was originally a cutter, later the Navy converted her to a brig.

Her contract ran from 16 October 1794 to 2 November 1801. As a cutter she had a burthen of 20268/94 tons (bm), and carried twelve 4-pounder guns. As a brig she had a burthen of 210 tons, was armed with 16 guns, and had a crew of 60 men.

== Service ==
In March—April 1795, Saxe Coburg was part of a squadron under the command of Commodore John Willett Payne, who had hoisted his pennant in Jupiter, Captain William Lechmere commanding. (Note: The database of the National Maritime Museum, Greenwich, confirms that Saxe Coburg was actually Marshal de Cobourg, and part of the squadron.) The squadron's task was to escort George, Prince of Wales's official wife, Caroline of Brunswick to Britain. Princess Caroline left from Cuxhaven on 28 March 1795 in Jupiter and, delayed by poor weather, landed at Greenwich on 5 April.

Marshall de Cobourg was under the command of Lieutenant Charles Webb on 12 December 1796 when she captured the French privateer lugger Espoir off Dungeness. Espoir was armed with two guns and had a crew of 18 men. (Note: Espoir was a 40-ton ("of load") lugger commissioned in Boulogne in May 1793 under Pierre-Louis-Nicolas Hardouin with 8 swivel guns and 6 smaller pieces (swivel-mounted, large caliber blunderbusses), and a crew of 37 men. She was under Jean-Pierre-Antoine Duchenne from October to November 1795, and under Pierre-Antoine-Joseph Sauvage, with 20 men and 2 guns, when Coburg captured her.)

Marechall de Cobourg recaptured Anson, of Wells, on 21 September.

At some point before October 1797, Marshall de Cobourg recaptured the ship Watts, of Mary Port, and the brig Blackest and Ridley, of North Shields. Webb and Marechal de Cobourg also recaptured the ship William, of Whitby, and the brig Eliza, of Sunderland.

At 7.a.m. on 25 February 1798 Cobourg, still under Webb's command, encountered a French privateer lugger at about 16 leagues from Cromer. A nine-hour chase ensued, including two hours of close combat. The lugger twice attempted to board but Coburg repulsed her, before a broadside brought down the lugger's main and mizzen masts, and took away her fore yard; at that point the lugger struck. She turned out to be Revanche, of 16 guns and 62 men, and she had lost seven men killed and eight wounded; Coburg had only two men lightly wounded. Webb just succeeded in evacuating all the prisoners and getting his own boarding party back, when Revanche sank, having taken more than 40 shots between wind and water. She was an entirely new vessel, the largest to have sailed out of Calais, and was six days into a one-month cruise, but had taken nothing. (Note: Lloyd's List stated that the privateer was reported to have captured a vessel sailing from Liverpool to Bremen.) (Note: Revanche was commissioned in January 1798. She was laid down in November 1797 and planned to be launched in December. She was 62 feet long and 57 feet at the keel (French feet), and was pierced for 12 guns. At the time of her commissioning under Jean Hedde she reportedly carried six 6-pounders and had a crew of 55 men. The discrepancy between the number of guns per French records and the number per her captors is an open issue. It may represent simply a discrepancy in the enumeration of swivel guns.)

Lord Spencer appointed Lieutenant Terence O'Neill commander of Marechal de Cobourg on 30 April 1798. At that time she was a brig.

Between 2 and 6 May 1798, Coburg (still described in prize money notices as a cutter), captured Werf Lust, Eendragt, Verwagting, Hoop, Jonge Paulus, and Jonge Adriana, which were Dutch fishing vessels.

On 14 September Marshall de Cobourg captured Mentor. Also in September Ranger and Cobourg captured Neptunus.

On 18 January 1799 Admiral Lord Viscount Duncan sent O'Neill and Marshall de Cobourg to cruise off the Texel. On 1 February, north of the Texel, Marshall de Cobourg sighted a cutter sailing towards them. The cutter's movements and signals suggested an enemy vessel, so O'Neill executed several deceptions to decoy her closer. When she came close enough Marshall de Cobourg fired a few shots and the cutter struck. The British took possession of the cutter and found that she was the Dutch privateer Flushinger, armed with four 2-pounder guns, and having a crew of 28 men under the command of Mynheer Van C. G. Hamendel. She was three days out of Helvoet, and had not captured anything. Marshall de Cobourg then returned to Yarmouth, but had to sail on to the Nore to replenish her ordnance stores.

O'Neill frequently carried messages from Duncan to the Dutch authorities at the Texel and earned their. On one occasion, when supplies on Cobourg were running low, the Dutch commodore, Commodore Capelle, sent O'Neill an abundant supply of provisions with a warm note.

The British and Dutch came to an agreement in autumn 1799 that they would, within certain limits, permit each other's fishermen to fish without interference. Therefore, on 25 March 1800 Admiral Lord Viscount Duncan wrote a letter to Admiral de Winter concerning a British fisherman's complaint that a Dutch privateer had chased him, and dispatched O'Neill and Cobourg to deliver the letter. de Winter replied that the privateer had been French, and so beyond his control.

On 25 April 1800 O'Neill received an appointment to Tromp as master and commander. (O'Neill sailed Tromp to the West Indies but on arrival had to give up command due to there being an officer there who had also been appointed to command her.)

Lieutenant James Watson commanded the cutter Saxe Cobourg in the North Sea until he received promotion to Commander in January 1801. Earlier, he had commanded the gun-brig Mastiff until she wrecked in January 1800.

A few days after O'Neill's promotion, on 4 and 5 May, Coburg was among the vessels that captured 12 outward-bound Greenland ships. The other vessels included the hired armed cutter Fox, Jalouse, and Cruizer, though most were much larger and included Monmouth, Glatton, Ganges, Director, and America, among others.

The hired cutters Rose and Cobourg shared the proceeds of the capture on 11 July of Kleine Charlotte.

On 2 March 1801, observers on shore in Southwold Bay observed a French vessel of 12 to 14 guns and 50 to 60 men working her way towards some coasters, and capturing a sloop. The Sea Fencibles were alerted, as was a detachment of dragoons, and a local shore battery fired a number of shots. The shots both drove off the privateer, and alerted other vessels in the area. Among the vessel the shots alerted were Cobourg and the hired lugger Speculator.

At nine o'clock in the evening the "Hired Brig Cobourg" was a few miles off the land and under the command of Lieutenant Mayson Wright when she captured the French privateer lugger Bienvenu (or Bien Venu), of Calais. She was armed with 14 carriage guns and was two days out of Calais. She had a crew of 80 men.

At the time of her capture two of her prizes were in sight and Wright hoped to recapture them. As it happened, Speculator succeeded in recapturing the sloop Adventure, which Bienvenu had captured.

Jalouse and Marshal de Cobourg captured several Dutch vessels on 22 and 23 July:

Negotie and Zeeward (22 July)
Hoop (same)
Jusfrouw Dirkje (23 July)

Coborg, Kite, and Espeigle shared in the proceeds of the capture on 3 October of Juffrow Catharine.

Three days later Cobourg captured the fishing vessel Jonge Jan. Kite shared by agreement with Cobourg in the proceeds.
