= Dutch ship Tromp (1777) =

History

Dutch Republic
- Name: Tromp, or Maarten Harpertszoon Tromp, or Admiraal Tromp
- Namesake: Admiral Maarten Tromp
- Builder: P. v. Zwinjndregt, Admiralty of the Maze, Rotterdam
- Launched: 1777, or 1779
- Captured: 17 August 1796

Great Britain
- Name: Tromp, or Van Tromp
- Acquired: 17 August 1796 by capture
- Fate: Sold 9 August 1815

General characteristics ,
- Type: Ship of the line
- Tonnage: "1004e"
- Tons burthen: 103965/94 (bm)
- Length: Dutch: 154' (Overdeck; Amsterdam foot) (Note: All linear measurements are in Amsterdam feet (voet) of 11 Amsterdam inches (duim) (see Dutch units of measurement). The Amsterdam foot is about 8% shorter than an English foot. The data is from the Rotterdams jaarboekje. e); HMS:143 ft 10 1/2 in (43.9 m)) (overall); 117 ft 10 in (35.9 m) (keel)
- Beam: Dutch: 43' 9/11; HMS:40 ft 8 3/4 in (12.4 m)
- Depth of hold: Dutch: 19'; HMS:15 ft 3 in (4.6 m)
- Propulsion: Sails
- Complement: Dutch: 200; HMS: na
- Armament: Dutch: 50-60 guns, or 54 guns; HMS (prison ship): 10 × 6-pounder guns; HMS (guardship): 12 × 12-pounder guns

Tromp was a 54-gun ship of the line of the Dutch States Navy launched at Rotterdam in 1777. She became part of the Batavian Navy in 1795 before the Royal Navy captured her at the capitulation of Saldanha Bay on 17 August 1796. The Royal Navy took her into service as HMS Tromp, sometimes referred to as HMS Van Tromp. In British service she served as a prison, troop, store, guard, hospital, or receiving ship until the Navy sold her in 1815.

== Dutch service and capture ==
As of 1 January 1788, Tromp was lying at Helvoet.

The Royal Navy captured Tromp at Saldanha Bay on 17 August 1796. She was under the command of Lieutenant Jan Valkenburg, and was carrying 280 crew and passengers.

== British service ==
The British commissioned Tromp in December 1796, under Captain Andrew Todd. In February 1797, Captain John Turnor of Echo was made post captain into Tromp, replacing Todd. Turnor transferred to HMS Trident and in November Captain Billy Douglas replaced him in Tromp. Between 3 January and 19 April 1798, Tromp was at Portsmouth being fitted as a 24-gun troopship. Captain Richard Hill commissioned her in February.

On 1 January 1799, Tromp was off Ireland. On 16 January, Van Tromp arrived at Spithead with the transport ship Abbey. They were coming from Cork, Ireland, with 620 French prisoners. (Note: The prisoners were from the French intervention in the Irish rebellion of 1798.) By 19 March, she was at Spithead, being fitted as a store ship. On 7 April, she sailed from Portsmouth with Diadem for Dublin. They were carrying the West York militia. Other warships, also armed en flute, were carrying the Oxford and the Cambridge militias.

In June Captain Richard Worsley took command of Tromp, but paid her off in December. In January 1800, the Admiralty ordered her to be fitted out as a prison ship for the West Indies. Between February and June she was at Chatham being fitted out. In April Commander Terence O'Neill commissioned her as a troopship. (Note: He had been promoted into Tromp from the hired armed cutter Marechal de Cobourg. Unbeknownst to him, another officer in the West Indies had been appointed to command Tromp when she arrived.)

On 17 July, Tromp, Circe, and Venus left Portsmouth with a convoy to the West. Indies. At Port Royal Tromp took up her role as a prison ship. Her first commander was Lieutenant Felix Frankling (acting), and then in 1800 Lieutenant William Byam. Lieutenant John Fitzgerald replaced Byam and held command until 1802. Tromp returned to Britain in September and was paid off. Commander John A. Norway recommissioned Tromp in June 1803. She was fitted at Portsmouth as a guardship in August. She became a hospital ship at Falmouth in January 1806 under the command of Lieutenant Michael M'Carthy.

However, she may have reverted to the role of guardship under Norway's command. On 6 June 1806, a court martial dismissed Norway from the Navy. The ship's carpenter had accused Norway of converting the king's stores to his private purposes, and for making false musters. The court found the charge of converting not proven, but convicted Norway of the false musters.

Then on 28 August 1807, Tromp detained the Danish ships Diamond and Karen Louisa. Recruit, Humber, Cheerful, and Experiment were in sight and so shared in the proceeds of the seizure. (Note: A second-class share, that of a lieutenant, was worth £11 7s 8d; a fifth-class share, that of a seaman, was worth 16s 6¼d.)

M'Carthy remained commander of Tromp though 1810. Then between April and May 1811, she was fitted as a receiving ship.

== Fate ==
Tromp was in ordinary at Portsmouth between 1812 and 1814. The Navy sold her there for £700 on 9 August 1815.
