= Pierre-Édouard Plucket =

French naval officer and privateer 1759–1845

Pierre-Édouard Plucket (Dunkirk, 11 October 1759 — Dunkirk, 4 September 1845; sometimes written "Plucket" and even "Tulki",) was a French Navy officer and privateer.

== Career ==
Plucket started sailing on a privateer in 1778; he was taken prisoner in England after the British HMS Amphitrite captured his ship, and was exchanged after several escape attempts. Promoted to officer, he took command of a merchantman and was almost wrecked in Ireland in July 1791; having been rescued, he took several soldiers hostage to avoid paying salvage fees and escaped, returning his captives on fishing ships encountered en route.

After the War of the First Coalition broke out, Plucket took command of the privateer brig Sans-Culotte nantais, with fourteen 4-pounder guns. In March, he captured two Dutch and six British ships.

Plucket then transferred on the 18-gun brig Patriote de Brest, property of the State. On 15 May, he battled a 26-gun British corvette for one hour, before the ships parted. On the 24th, he engaged a 20-gun East Indiaman, trying unsuccessfully to board her before a British frigate drove him away. On 1 June, Patriote sprang a leak, forcing Plucket to jettison all but two of his guns, and make a hasty return to Brest; chased by British 28-gun corvette on the 6th, he fought a three-hour running battle before reaching the safety of Île de Batz. Patriote then returned to Brest by way of Morlaix, taking passage with a convoy escorted by two corvettes. The population gave the wounded Plucket a triumphal reception and the nickname of "second Jean Bart".

Plucket then joined the Navy with the rank of Lieutenant. He served on the 74-guns Tigre and Jemmapes, taking part in the Atlantic campaign of May 1794.

On 5 October 1795, (Note: Gallois says on 13 May (Gallois, vol. 1, p. 293).) he took command of the corvette Jalouse. HMS Vestal, under the command of Captain Charles White, captured Jalouse at about 5a.m. on 13 May near Elsinor after a chase of about nine hours and running about 84 hours. Plucket was taken prisoner but escaped, disguised as a physician, and returned to Amsterdam and from there to France. The court-martial reviewing the loss of Jalouse acquitted him.

Plucket then took command of the privateer Résolu, chartered to ferry troops to Ireland. He took four prizes but had to abandon two of them to escape a frigate and a cutter. He eventually returned to Calais after 78 days, having captured 19 ships.

Plucket then returned to the Navy as second-in-command of the frigate Poursuivante, under Castaignier. He later took temporary command of Poursuivante, before passing it to Lhermitte.

Unable to garner financial gain from his prizes, he retired and eventually returned to Dunkirk.

== Honours ==
- Promoted to Knight of the Legion of Honour on 21 September 1840.

== Legacy ==
- A street in Dunkirk has born his name since 30 October 1958.
