= HMS Princess of Orange (1799) =

Third-rate ship of the line of the Royal Navy

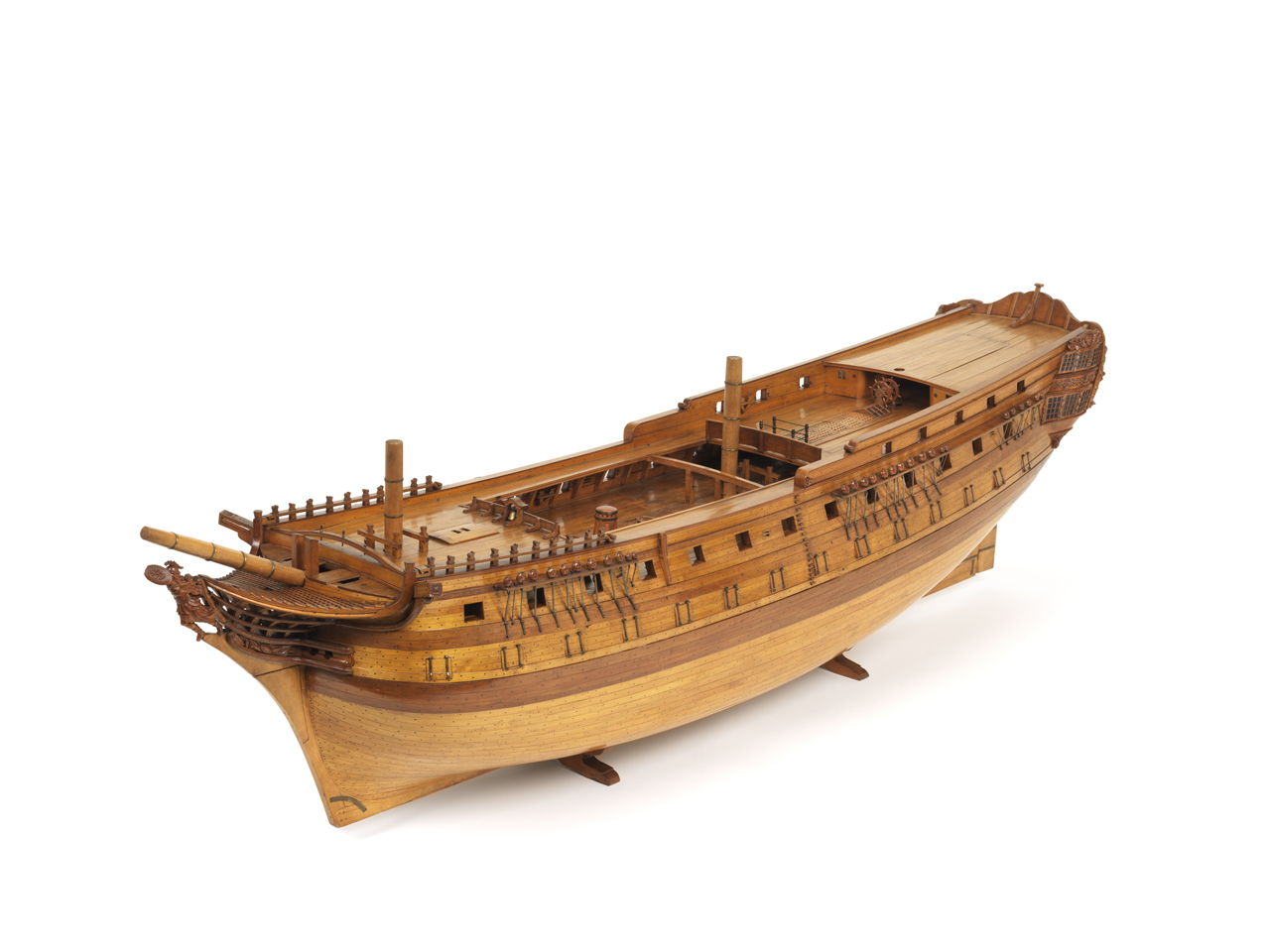
- Ship model of Washington

History

Batavian Republic
- Name: Washington
- Namesake: George Washington
- Operator: Batavian Navy
- Laid down: 1795, Amsterdam
- Launched: 9 August 1796
- Captured: 30 August 1799

Great Britain
- Name: HMS Princess of Orange
- Acquired: 1799 by purchase of a prize
- Fate: Sold 18 April 1822 for breaking up

General characteristics
- Class & type: 74-gun
- Tons burthen: 1,56520/94 (bm)
- Length: Overall: 168 ft 5 in (51.3 m); Keel: 138 ft 0 3/4 in (42.1 m)
- Beam: 46 ft 2 in (14.1 m)
- Depth of hold: 18 ft 5 1/2 in (5.6 m)
- Complement: 590
- Armament: Lower deck: 28 × 32-pounder guns; Upper deck:28 × 18-pounder guns; QD:2 × 18-pounder guns + 10 × 32-pounder carronades; Fc:2 × 18-pounder guns + 4 × 32-pounder carronades

Washington was a 74-gun ship of the line of the Batavian Navy. In 1799 the Royal Navy captured her during the Vlieter incident and subsequently renamed her HMS Princess of Orange. From 1800 to 1811 she served on the North Sea, Channel, and Irish stations frequently serving as a flagship for various British admirals. Between 1811 and 1820 she served as a powder hulk; she was sold for breaking up in 1822.

== Royal Navy service ==
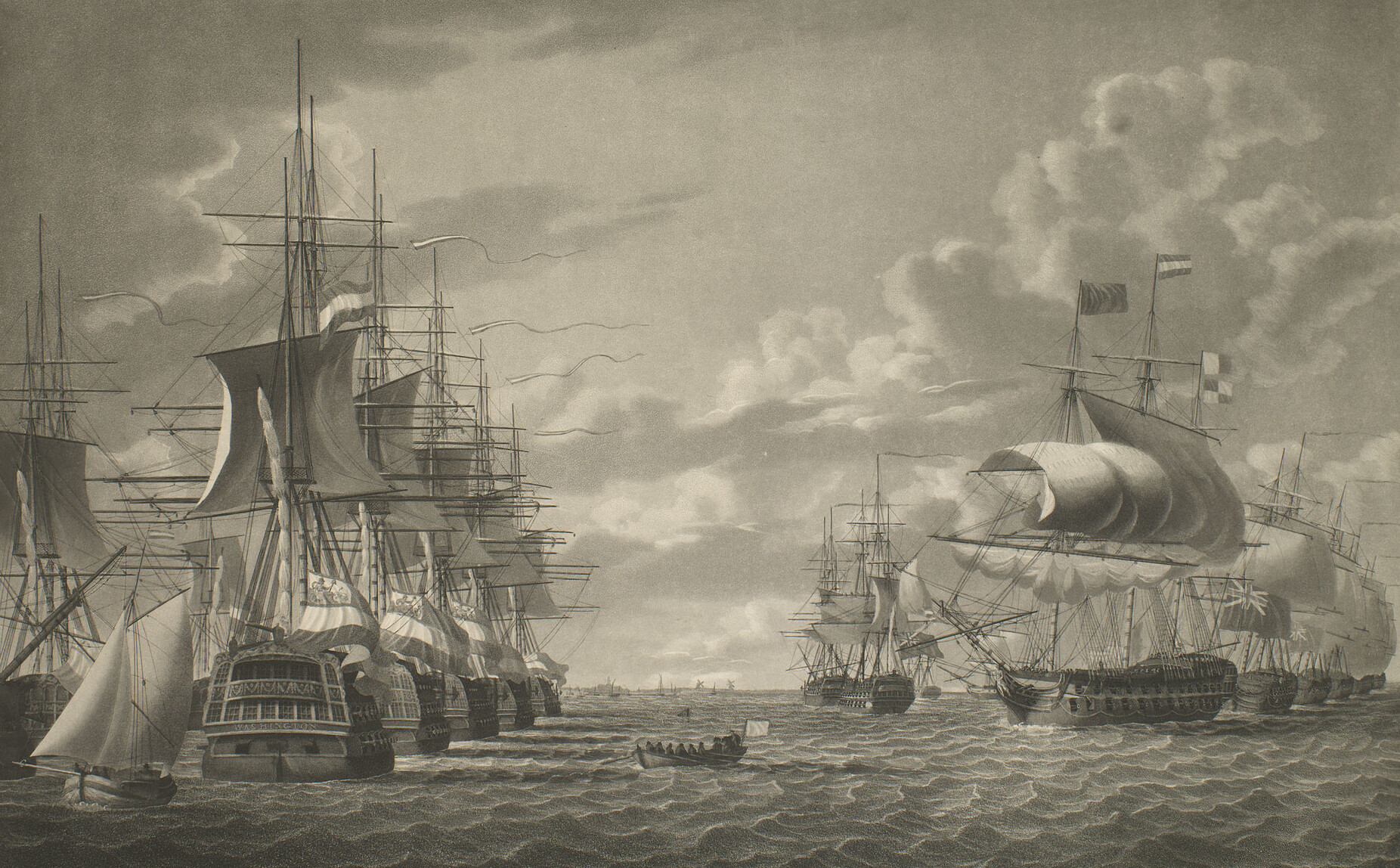
Washington (left) at the Vlieter incident in 1799

Captain G. Hope commissioned Princess of Orange in August 1800.

In November 1800 Captain Charles Cobb transferred from HMS Glatton to Princess of Orange. On 30 November he sailed her from Sheerness to Yarmouth to remain with the North Sea fleet. From January 1801 she was the flagship of Admiral Archibald Dickson. At the end of April 1802, upon the implementation of the Treaty of Amiens, Princess of Orange sailed up the Thames to Chatham where she was paid off. By June she was in Ordinary.

In May 1803, following the resumption of war with France, Captain Charles Cunningham commissioned Princess of Orange, and soon after assumed the command of a squadron sent to watch the Dutch fleet in the Texel. (Note: Marshall mistakenly named Cunningham's command as Prince of Orange, which did not exist at the time.)

In September 1803 Captain Thomas Rogers replaced Cunningham, with Princess of Orange being assigned to the North Sea station. She then served in the squadron blockading the Texel, though she made voyages back to Yarmouth for supplies.

Princess of Orange, Eagle, Majestic, Glatton, Raisonable, Africiane, Inspector, Beaver, the hired armed cutter Swift, and the hired armed lugger Agnes, shared in the proceeds of the capture of Upstalsboom, H.L. De Haase, master, on 11 November 1804. (Note: The prize money for a seaman was 10d.)

In September 1804 Princess of Orange was at Sheerness having her damaged rudder repaired; on 21 September she returned to the Texel. On 27 November she arrived at Portsmouth where Admiral William O'Brien Drury joined her, he having been appointed second-in-command of the Irish station. She sailed on 24 December and by 30 December was in Bantry Bay. In early 1805 Princess of Orange transferred to the Channel fleet. On 6 August she arrived at the Downs from Plymouth, and then went on to Yarmouth. She briefly again blockaded the Texel, before returning to Sheerness on 2 September. There she was to be paid off, with her crew being transferred to Powerful, which was being sent to the East Indies. Instead, with the Trafalgar campaign under way, she joined the North Sea squadron under Rear-Admiral Thomas Macnamara Russell.

Princess of Orange was among the vessels that shared in the proceeds of the detention on 21 October r1805 of Anna Wilhelmina.

Princess of Orange returned to Sheerness at the end of January 1806 and was paid off in February.

Captain Joshua Sidney Horton commissioned Princess of Orange in June 1806, for the Downs. She then became the flagship for Vice Admiral John Holloway.

On 28 August 1807 the boats of Princess of Orange, Blazer, and Bustler detained the Dutch vessels Eos and Amicitia. Consequently, all three vessels shared in the proceeds of the prize-taking. (Note: A second-class share of the proceeds, that of a Lieutenant, was worth £30 1s 6½d; a sixth-class share, that of an Ordinary Seaman, was worth £1 1s 0¼d.)

In 1807 Princess of Orange became flagship to Admiral Bartholomew Samuel Rowley.

Then on 13 October 1807 Commander Francis Beauman received promotion to post captain and took command of Prince of Orange. From February 1808 to March 1811, Princess of Orange was flagship to Admiral Sir Gorge Campbell, first on the Downs station (1808), and then the Baltic station (1809–1810).

Princess of Orange was paid off in June 1811. From then until 1820 she served as a powder hulk in the Medway.

== Fate ==
The "Principal Officers and Commissioners of His Majesty's Navy", offered "Princess of Orange, of 74 guns and 1565 tons", "lying at Chatham" for sale on 13 April 1822. She was sold five days later for breaking up.
