= HMS Investigator (1811) =

Brig of the Royal Navy

History

United Kingdom
- Name: HMS Investigator
- Ordered: 26 May 1810
- Builder: Deptford Dockyard
- Laid down: January 1811
- Launched: 23 April 1811
- Reclassified: Police ship in March 1837
- Fate: Broken up in October 1857

General characteristics
- Class & type: survey brig
- Tons burthen: 121 (bm)
- Length: Overall:75 ft 0 3/8 in (22.9 m); Keel:72 ft 10 7/8 in (22.2 m)
- Beam: 19 ft (5.8 m)
- Depth of hold: 10 ft 10 5/8 in (3.318 m)
- Propulsion: Sails
- Sail plan: brig
- Armament: 6 × 12-pounder carronades

HMS Investigator was a survey brig of the Royal Navy. She performed surveying duties until she was paid off in 1835. She then became a police ship moored on the Thames River. she was broken up in 1857.

== Career ==
Investigator was built at Deptford Dockyard to a design by Henry Peake. She was commissioned under Mr. George Thomas, for the North Sea and stationed at Hosely Bay. She then was reassigned to the River Thames. In 1813 George Trickey (or Trickly), master, sailed her surveying Irish waters.

By 1814 George Thomas had returned to command for the North Sea. He would remain her master until she was paid-off in 1835. He was the first naval hydrographic surveyor continuously employed in the 19th century. His tenure was due to the high regard of the three Admiralty hydrographers whom he served until 1846.

Investigator underwent fitting for sea at Deptford in 1819. Thomas recommissioned Investigator in 1819 and February 1825. On 1 November 1825 Investigator was surveying the coast when North Sea gales stove in her bulwarks and washed away her boats. It was feared that her tender had foundered with all hands. However, Amity, Robinson, master, had with difficulty rescued the eight crew members of the tender, the cutter Star. Star was in a waterlogged state and her crew abandoned their vessel.

Thomas recommissioned Investigator in March 1831, and February 1834. Investigator was paid off at Woolwich in 1835.

She was converted to a police ship in March 1837 and was moored in the River Thames at Somerset House, London, the forerunner of Waterloo Police Pier.

On 19 April 1842, she sprang a leak and sank. The seven police officers on board were rescued.

== Fate ==
She was subsequently broken up at Deptford on 17 October 1857.
