= HMS Hirondelle =

UK naval brig 1804–1808

History

France
- Name: Hirondelle
- Namesake: (French: Swallow)
- Builder: Cette
- Launched: 1804

United Kingdom
- Name: HMS Hirondelle
- Acquired: 1804 by capture
- Fate: Wrecked 23 February 1808

General characteristics
- Tons burthen: 210 (bm)
- Sail plan: Cutter, or schooner, though she appears to have been converted to a brig while serving the Royal Navy
- Complement: 80 when captured
- Armament: 14 × 12-pounder guns when captured

HMS Hirondelle was the French privateer Hirondelle that HMS Bittern captured in 1804. The Royal Navy took Hirondelle into service under her existing name. She captured a number of vessels in the Mediterranean and participated in one notable action against a Turkish vessel. She was wrecked in 1808 with the loss of almost her entire crew.

== Capture ==
Hirondelle was a privateer from Marseille, originally with 180 men and 14 guns.

In the evening of 27th Hirondelle captured, after an action, the Government of Malta brig King George off Cape Passero.

The next morning Bittern, which had been sent in search of Hirondelle, was eight leagues from Cape Passero when she sighted Hirondelle capturing two brigs. At Bittern's approach, the three vessels separated. Hirondelle apparently set off after a sloop she had sighted.

Captain Robert Corbet of Bittern detached two boats, one for each of the brigs, and set off in pursuit of Hirondelle. After a chase of 36 hours, in perfect calm, Bittern was able to capture Hirondelle. To catch her, Corbett had converted the smaller spars he carried to sweeps (large oars). His crew rowed all 36 hours without a break, not even for meals, and covered some 60 miles without the assistance of any wind.

During the last six hours of the chase, the two had exchanged fire from their bow and stern chasers. Hirondelle's fire, aimed primarily at Bittern's mast and except for one hole between wind and water, which was easily stopped, did little damage. One shot from Bittern caused a hole in Hirondelle that had her fast filling with water, forcing her to strike. (Note: Some accounts credit the capture to Madras. However, Captain Schomberg, of Madras, was senior officer at Malta, and it was he who had sent Corbet out to find Hirondelle, and it was Schomberg who transmitted Corbet's letter to him on to Admiral Lord Nelson, commander-in-chief in the Mediterranean.) Bittern's crew was able to stop this hole too.

Corbet described Hirondelle as a "very fine cutter", fitted out at Cette and just launched. Her hull had copper sheathing, and she was armed with fourteen 12-pounder guns. She had a complement of 80 crew, many of whom were away on prizes.

From Hirondelle Corbet found out about the capture of King George. He dispatched his launch, whose crew then rowed 15 leagues to try to recapture King George before she reached Syracuse. However, they were unable to catch up in time.

When Bittern's boats recaptured the two brigs, they turned out to be Mentor, of London, and Catherine, of Liverpool. They had been sailing with valuable cargoes from Messina to Malta to join a convoy. Lloyd's List reported that Bittern had recaptured Mentor and Catherine, and their captor.

== Career ==
On 19 June 1804, Admiral Lord Nelson ordered the purchase of Hirondelle at Malta and her assignment to Malta to serve Admiral Sir Alexander Ball, Civil Commissioner of Malta.

Nelson appointed "Lieutenant Skinner" on 12 August to command Hirondelle. (Note: The editor of Nelson's despatches and letters identifies this Skinner as "Lieutenant John Skinner". In the relevant letter, Nelson described Hirondelle as being over-gunned, and of Skinner removing her "two heavy [guns]".)

Spider captured the French privateer Andromeda, of four guns and 43 men on 10 December 1805, cutting her out of the port of Reggio. She shared the prize money for the capture with Hirondelle.

By 1807, Hirondelle was under the command of Lieutenant George Augustus Elliot Skinner.

On 19 February 1807, Glatton captured the Turkish vessels San Giovanni Pidomias and Codro Mariolo. That same day Glatton and Hirondelle captured San Michelle. (Note: More than 12 years later, the prize money for a seaman for San Giovanni Pidomias and Codro Mariolo was £1 2s 4d.)

Four days later, Hirondelle captured the vessel Madonna, with Glatton sharing by agreement. (Note: Unfortunately, the prize agent for the vessel went bankrupt in 1816. As a result, the fourth and final payment of prize money was not paid out until July 1850. At that time, a first-class share was worth £4 14s 5½d; a fifth-class share was worth 3¾d. The payments represented 5¼d per £1 that the prize agents had owed.) On 26 February Hirondelle captured San Nicollo, and Glatton again shared by agreement.

On 1 March, boats from Glatton cut out a former French corvette in Turkish service from the port of Sigri on the island of Mitylene. The vessel was pierced for 18 guns but only 10 were mounted. The British boarding party lost five officers and men killed and nine men wounded. Hirondelle provided support.

The next day Glatton and Hirondelle captured three more Turkish vessels, names unknown but with masters Statio, Constantine, and Papeli. Prize money for these vessels, and San Michelle, was paid in October 1816. (Note: A first-class share for San Michelle and two merchantmen was worth £25 4s 9½d; a fifth-class share was worth 1s 9d. The prize money for the third merchantman was much better. A first-class share was worth £323 2s 0½d; a fifth-class share was worth £1 2s 8d.)

On 4 March Glatton and Hirondelle captured another Turkish vessel. (Note: For the vessel with the unknown name a fifth-class share was worth £7 7s 7d.) (Note: As in the case of Madonna, the fourth and final payment was paid in July 1850. A first-class share was worth 11s 8½d; a fifth-class share was worth ½d.)

A prize money announcement had Hirondelle, under the command of Lieutenant John Skinner, capturing Aristides on 21 September 1807.

== Fate ==
On 23 February 1808 Hirondelle was under the command of Lieutenant Joseph Kidd and transporting despatches from Malta to Tunis. Suddenly breakers were sighted ahead and though the crew threw over anchors, it was too late and she grounded. Waves swamped a boat carrying some of the crew that were leaving the ship. The brig then capsized. In all, next morning there were only four survivors, with Kidd not being among them. The survivors walked to a nearby village. The court martial found that Hirondelle had probably steered a wrong course that led her into Cape Bon.
