= HMS Raisonnable (1768) =

Ship of the line of the Royal Navy

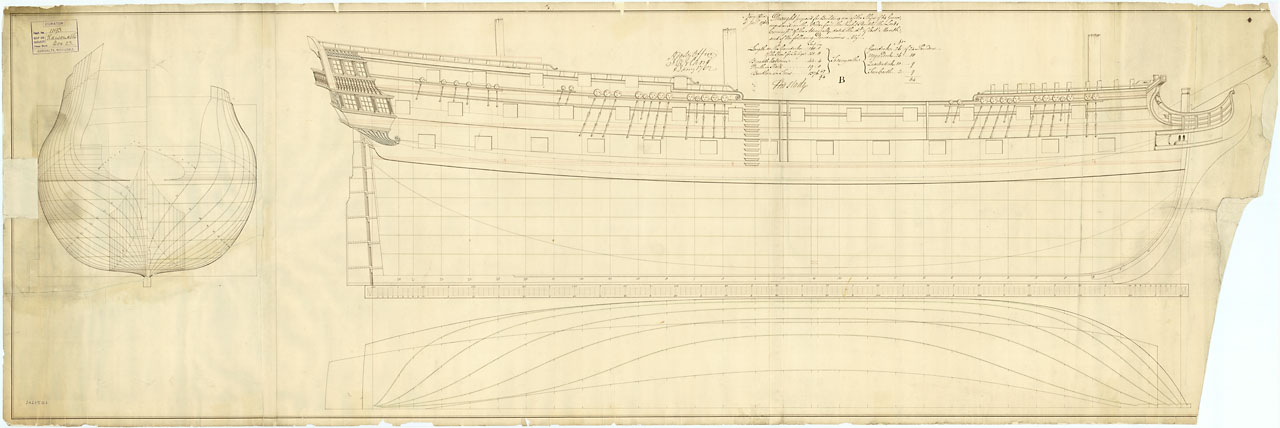
- Raisonnable

History

Great Britain
- Name: HMS Raisonnable
- Ordered: 11 January 1763
- Builder: Chatham Dockyard
- Laid down: 25 November 1765
- Launched: 10 December 1768
- Honours and awards: Participated in: Battle of Copenhagen; Battle of Cape Finisterre
- Fate: Broken up, 1815

General characteristics
- Class & type: Ardent-class ship of the line
- Tons burthen: 1386
- Length: 160 ft (49 m) (gundeck)
- Beam: 44 ft 4 in (13.51 m)
- Depth of hold: 19 ft (5.8 m)
- Propulsion: Sails
- Sail plan: Full-rigged ship
- Complement: 500 officers and men
- Armament: 64 guns: Gundeck: 26 × 24 pdrs; Upper gundeck: 26 × 18 pdrs; Quarterdeck: 10 × 4 pdrs; Forecastle: 2 × 9 pdrs

HMS Raisonnable (sometimes spelt Raisonable) was a 64-gun third-rate ship of the line of the Royal Navy, named after the ship of the same name captured from the French in 1758. She was built at Chatham Dockyard, launched on 10 December 1768 and commissioned on 17 November 1770 under the command of Captain Maurice Suckling, Horatio Nelson's uncle. Raisonnable was built to the same lines as HMS Ardent, and was one of the seven ships forming the Ardent class of 1761. Raisonnable was the first ship in which Nelson served.

== Service history ==
At the request of Nelson's father, Suckling entered the young Horatio Nelson as midshipman into the ship's books, though Nelson did not embark until a couple of months after this (it was not uncommon practise to rate sons of relatives or friends several months before they entered the ship, though Admiralty orders expressly forbade this), on 15 March 1771. Raisonnable had been in the process of commissioning at this time, in response to an expected conflict with Spain. However, the war never developed, and Raisonnable remained in the Medway as a guard ship. At this time, Suckling took command of the 74-gun HMS Triumph, and took Nelson with him.

The ship re-commissioned on 25 May 1771 under Captain Henry St. John, a mere 10 days since paying off as a guard ship, and joined the Channel Fleet. St John was succeeded by Captain Thomas Greaves on 23 January 1773, and Raisonnable paid off at Plymouth on 23 September 1775.

=== American Revolutionary War ===
She was again re-commissioned on 25 February 1776 under Captain Thomas Fitzherbert, and despatched to the North American Station. On 24 December 1776 she captured the American brig Dalton, capturing all hands, which it delivered to Plymouth as prisoners of war. Among the papers on board the Dalton was a copy of the United States Declaration of Independence. On 19 February 1778 she captured schooner Williams off the St. Georges Bank. On 24 May 1778 she, with HMS Diamond, captured and burned American schooner Fly off Cape Cod. On 27 May she, with HMS Diamond, captured American brig "Sally" off Cape Cod. On 28 May she, with HMS Diamond, captured Connecticut privateer General McDougall off Cape Cod. In July 1778, Raisonnable formed part of Lord Howe's squadron, which was lying off Sandy Hook. The French Admiral d'Estaing was nearby with a large fleet, and the two opposing sides were only prevented from engaging in battle by the weather and sea conditions, which forced the two fleets to disperse.

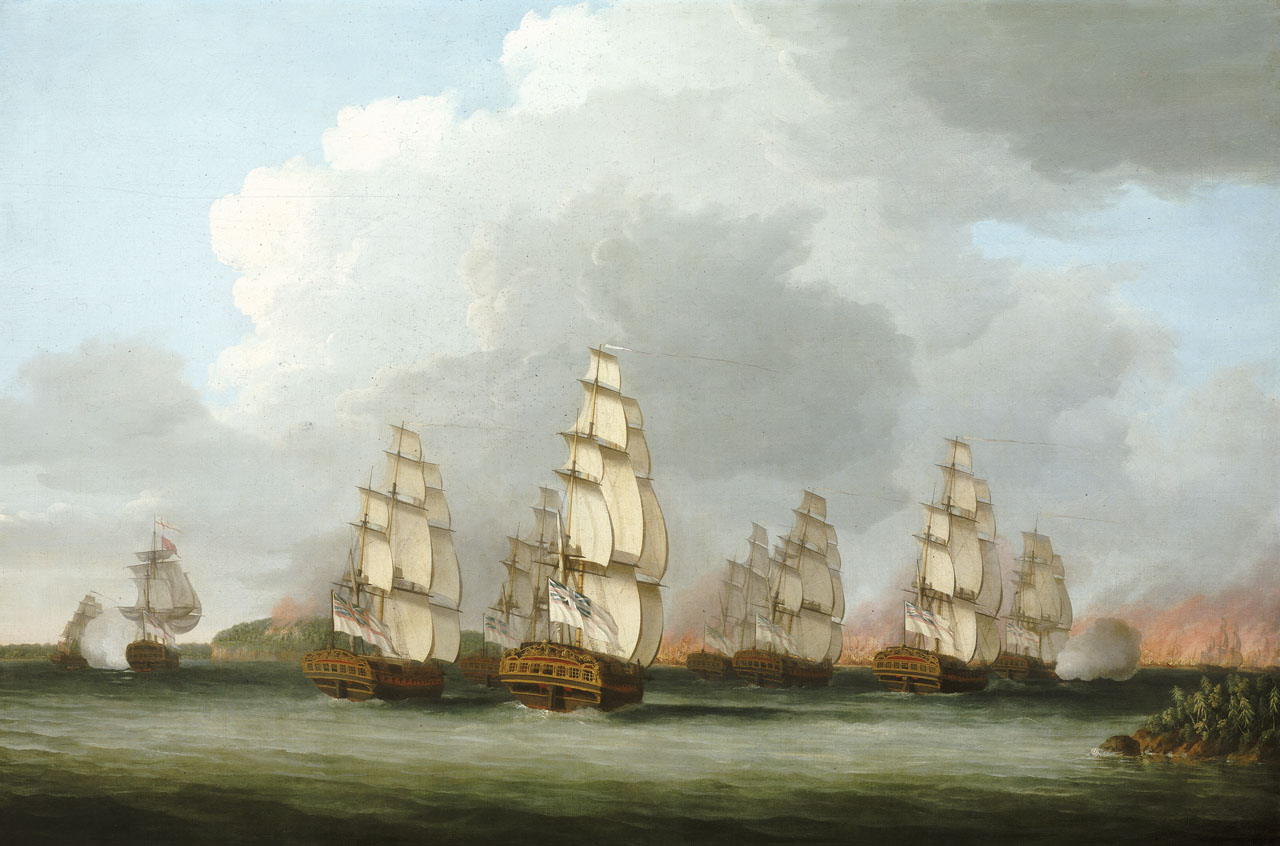
Destruction of the American Fleet at Penobscot Bay by Dominic Serres. Raisonnable seen here in the far left background firing into Hunter on the Penobscot Expedition

Captain Henry Francis Evans took command of Raisonnable on 5 December 1778, and in May of the following year, took part in an assault on Hampton Roads, as part of Commodore Sir George Collier's squadron. On 1 June Raisonnable was in action on the Hudson River, during which two forts were captured. In August, with Collier embarked, Raisonnable sailed to Penobscot, where British forces were under heavy siege. Immediately after arriving, Collier's squadron of 7 ships engaged a rebel fleet of 41 vessels, of which 2 were captured, and the rest were either sunk or destroyed to prevent capture.

In January 1780, Raisonnable was part of Vice Admiral Mariot Arbuthnot's squadron which took part in the siege of Charleston, South Carolina, although Raisonnable, along with the 5 other third rates in the squadron, was sent back to New York before the siege began. Captain Evans left the ship on 14 May 1780.

Captain Sir Digby Dent assumed the command on 30 August, and returned the ship to England. Dent transferred to Repulse on 16 December, and Raisonnable paid off in January the following year. On 11 May 1781 she went into dock, during which time she had her bottom coppered. She was re-launched on 14 January 1782 and placed under the command of Captain Smith Child on 15 May, until 29 August when he shifted to HMS Europa.

She was commissioned again on 8 January 1782 under Captain Lord Hervey, but brought back to Chatham in August for decommissioning. Her crew were to be discharged to other vessels, but there were delays in finalising their departures and they became mutinous. Captain Hervey made an unsuccessful appeal to the crew to return to their stations, and then had the ringleaders of the mutiny arrested at gunpoint. The mutiny promptly collapsed, and Raisonnable was sailed to Sheerness Dockyard where she was placed under guard. Four mutineers were sentenced to death for their part in the uprising.

The American war at this stage was coming to an end, and Raisonnable was no longer required by the Navy, and so was laid up in ordinary – a state in which she remained for some ten years.

=== French Revolutionary War ===
When war with France broke out in 1793, Raisonnable, along with many other vessels, was brought out of ordinary, and made ready for service once more. On 31 January she was re-commissioned under Captain James, Lord Cranstoun. She joined with the Channel Fleet in April, but was back in dock, in Portsmouth this time, on 14 January 1794. She put to sea again in March, but returned to dock in Portsmouth in September so as her copper might be replaced. She once more re-joined the Channel Fleet on 1 November, and remained on active service until 14 October 1796, when she was docked at Plymouth for re-coppering. She returned to duty in January 1797, and during 1799, Captain Charles Boyles took over the command, and left the ship again, when Raisonnable returned to Chatham on 21 January 1800, for HMS Saturn. She was dry docked on 2 April for re-coppering and other repairs, and sailed again on 19 August.

Captain John Dilkes became Raisonnable's commanding officer on 21 January 1801, and the ship joined the North Sea Squadron. 1801 saw the creation of an alliance between Denmark, Norway, Prussia and Russia, which cut Britain off from the supplies relied upon from the Baltic. Raisonnable joined Admiral Sir Hyde Parker's fleet sent to attack the Danes at Copenhagen. On 2 April, she took part in the Battle of Copenhagen. After the battle, she was attached to a squadron under Captain George Murray in Edgar, which included one of Raisonnable's sister ships, HMS Agamemnon, to watch the Swedish Navy at Karlskrona. Once the situation in the Baltic was resolved, Raisonnable returned to the North Sea, before paying off.

When the Treaty of Amiens was signed in March 1802, Raisonnable was docked at Chatham in July and her copper repaired. She was on station at Sheerness once again by the end of December.

=== Napoleonic Wars ===
War broke out again with France in March 1803, and Raisonnable was by this time under the command of Captain William Hotham. She joined Admiral William Cornwallis and the Channel Fleet, and participated in the blockade of Brest. On 11 November 1804, Glatton, together with Eagle, Majestic, Princess of Orange, Raisonable, Africaine, Inspector, Beaver, and the hired armed vessels Swift and Agnes, shared in the capture of Upstalsboom, H.L. De Haase, Master. (Note: The prize money for an ordinary seaman was 10d.)

In September Hotham was replaced by Captain Robert Barton, who was himself replaced in April 1805 by Captain Josias Rowley. In July 1805, she was with Admiral Sir Robert Calder's squadron off Ferrol, when they fell in with the combined Franco-Spanish fleet under Admiral Villeneuve, and took part in the ensuing Battle of Cape Finisterre.

Raisonnable remained on blockade duty until sailing from Cork in late 1805 with Commodore Sir Home Riggs Popham's squadron, consisting of 9 vessels, including another of Raisonnable's sister ships, Belliqueux, for the Cape of Good Hope. The following campaign saw British troops drive the Dutch out of Cape Town, and the subsequent peace terms handed the Cape dependencies to the British crown. In April 1806, after receiving news that the people of Buenos Aires were unhappy with Spanish rule, and would welcome the British, Popham sailed with his squadron to the Río de la Plata. Popham was replaced by Rear Admiral Murray, and following a disastrous second attempt to take Buenos Aires, Raisonnable returned to the Cape.

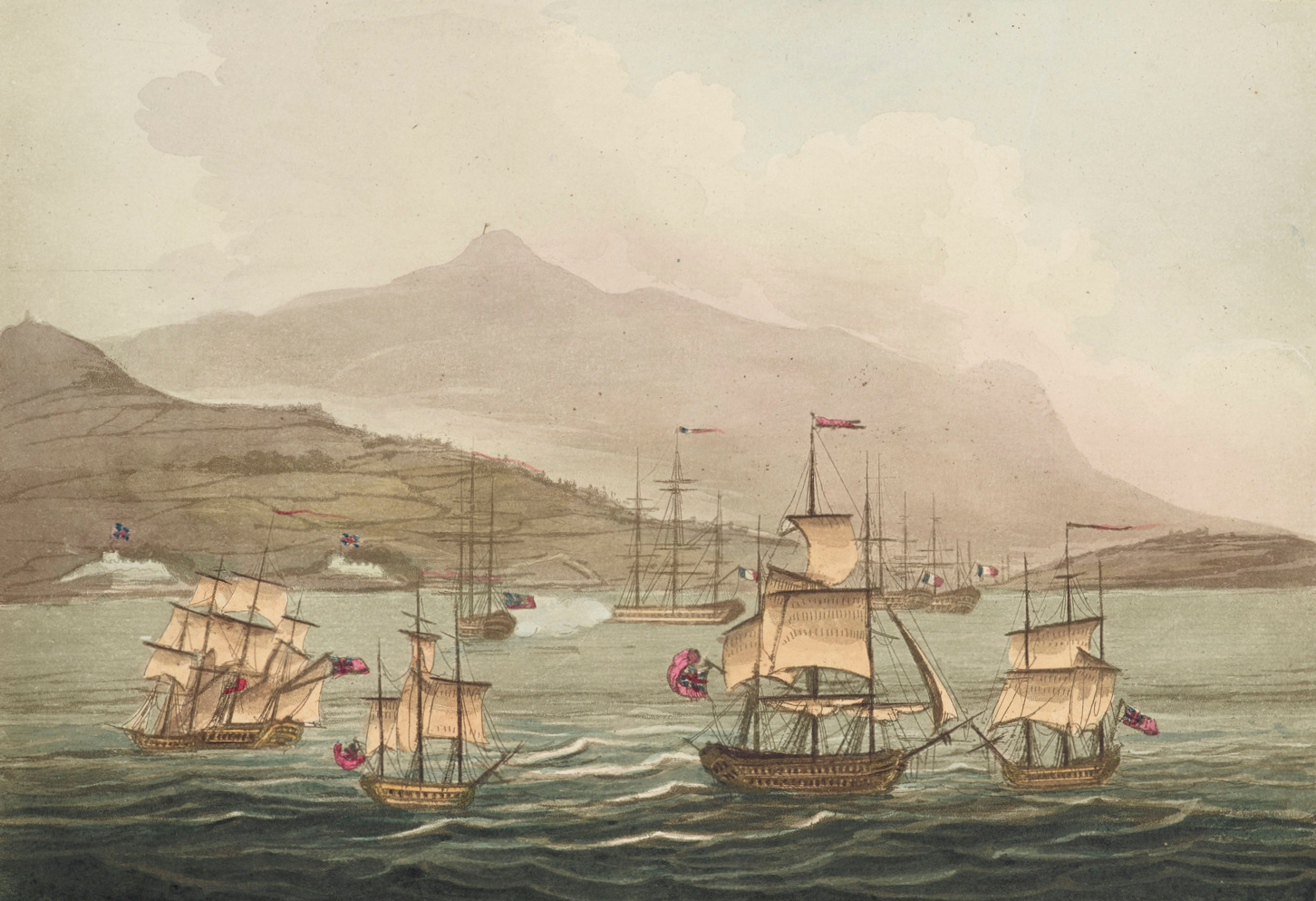
An illustration showing Raisonnable attacking Saint-Paul on 21 September 1809. In the background, Sirius rakes Caroline.

In 1809, Captain Rowley commanded a squadron that blockaded Mauritius (the Isle of France) and Réunion (the Isle of Bourbon). On 20 September, Rowley, commanding the squadron from HMS Nereide, succeeded in taking the town of Saint-Paul, the batteries, a 40-gun frigate Caroline, a 16-gun brig, and 2 merchantmen, as well as rescuing two ships of the East India Company (Streatham and Europe). Captain Rowley transferred to HMS Boadicea during March 1810, and Captain John Hatley took over the command, paying the ship off in Chatham at the end of July.

== Fate ==
In November 1810, Raisonnable was hulked and converted into a receiving ship, and towed to Sheerness. In March 1815, she was finally broken up.

== Fiction ==
HMS Raisonnable is mentioned in Patrick O'Brian's The Mauritius Command, the fourth novel in the Aubrey-Maturin series.

HMS Raisonnable is mentioned in Dewey Lambdin's Hostile Shores, the nineteenth novel in the Alan Lewrie series.

HMS Raisonnable is mentioned in Bernard Cornwell's The Fort in her role as part of the British relief fleet during the Penobscot Expedition.

Some of the action in S. Thomas Russell's novel Take, Burn or Destroy takes place on board HMS Raisonnable at the Battle of the Glorious First of June.
