= HMS Mastiff (1797) =

Brig of the Royal Navy

History

Great Britain
- Name: Herald
- Builder: Hull
- Launched: 1790
- Fate: Sold to the government 1797

Great Britain
- Name: GB No. 35
- Namesake: Mastiff
- Builder: Leith
- Acquired: March 1797 by purchase
- Renamed: HMS Mastiff
- Fate: Wrecked 5 January 1800

General characteristics
- Tons burthen: 153, or 163 (bm)
- Length: Overall: 71 ft 7 in (21.8 m); Keel: 57 ft 10 1/4 in (17.6 m)
- Beam: 23 ft 0 in (7.0 m)
- Depth of hold: 10 ft 1 1/4 in (3.1 m)
- Propulsion: Sail
- Complement: 50
- Armament: 1797:2 × 18-pounder guns + 10 × 18-pounder carronades

HMS Mastiff was launched at Hull in 1790, as Herald. From there she traded with the Baltic. The British Royal Navy purchased her in 1797, had her fitted at Leith, and named her GB №35, and then Mastiff. She served as a convoy escort in the North Sea until she wrecked in 1800.

== Mercantile career ==
Herald first appeared in Lloyd's Register (LR) in 1790 with Pearson, master, Middleton, owner, and trade Hull–Petersburg.

Year	Master	Owner	Trade	Source & notes
1791	P.Pearson; T.Grindlay; P.Clark	Middleton; Grindlay & Co.	Hull–Petersburg	LR
1794	J.Mackie	Grindlay	Leith–London	LR
1798	Grindlay	Grindlay	Hull–Riga	LR; hand-written annotation, "Sold to Government for a Gunvessel"

== Naval career ==
After the onset of war with France Britain's merchant fleet provided French, and later Dutch privateers with a target-rich environment. The British Royal Navy needed escort vessels and a quick fix was to buy existing merchant vessels, arm and man them, and then deploy them. Between March and April the Admiralty purchased 10 brigs at Leith, Herald among them. The Royal Navy initially designated these as GB №__, but then gave them names before they actually sailed.

GB №35 underwent fitting at Leith between 20 March 1797 and 11 July. In April Lieutenant John Clements commissioned her for the North Sea. The Navy renamed her Mastiff on 7 November 1797.

== Loss ==
In January, Mastiff was under the command of Lieutenant James Watson. As she was sailing from Great Yarmouth on 5 January 1800, bound for Leith via the Northern Passage, she rounded the Cockle Buoy. As she did so, the wind died down. A strong ebb tide with a swell then carried her on to the Cockle Sands, wrecking her.

Two fishermen from Winterton, in Norfolk, Abel King and William Pile, volunteered to go out and try to rescue the crew. Other fishermen from Winterton joined them. In all, and at great risk to their own lives, the fishermen rescued upwards of 30 of the crew.

The navy convened a court martial on 15 January aboard HMS Glatton in Yarmouth Roads to try Lieutenant Watson for Mastiff's loss. The court exonerated Watson, his officers, and crew of the loss. It further praised Watson for his truly meritorious conduct after the wrecking, and also that of his officers and crew.

On 7 April, the Lords of the Admiralty gave 25 guineas each to King and Pile, and another 100 guineas to be distributed to the other volunteers, in recognition of their efforts to save Mastiff's crew.
