= HMS Glatton (1795) =

British ship of the line (1792–1830)

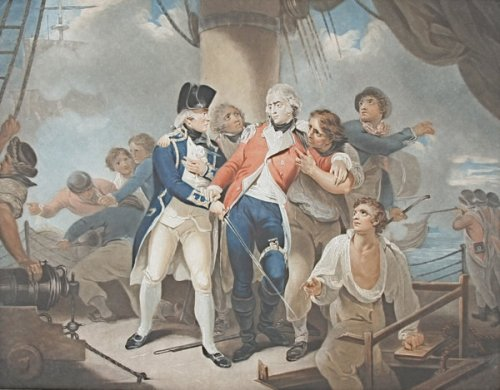
- Captain Henry Trollope with the mortally wounded Marine Captain Henry Ludlow Strangeways on the deck of HMS Glatton

History

British East India Company
- Name: Glatton
- Owner: Richard Neave
- Builder: Wells & Co. of Blackwell
- Launched: 29 November 1792
- Fate: Sold to the Royal Navy in 1795

Great Britain
- Name: HMS Glatton
- Acquired: 1795, from the EIC
- Commissioned: April 1795
- Honours and awards: Naval General Service Medal with clasp "Copenhagen 1801"
- Fate: Sunk as breakwater, 1830

General characteristics
- Tons burthen: 1221, or 125621/94 (bm)
- Sail plan: Full-rigged ship
- Complement: East Indiaman: 125. Royal Navy: 343
- Armament: East Indiaman: 26 × 12- & 6-pounder guns.; RN from 1795: Upper deck – 28 × 32-pounder carronades; Lower deck – 28 × 68-pounder carronades (later replaced by 18-pounder long guns); RN from 1804: 44 guns

HMS Glatton was a 56-gun fourth rate of the Royal Navy. Wells & Co. of Blackwell launched her on 29 November 1792 for the British East India Company (EIC) as the East Indiaman Glatton. The Royal Navy bought her in 1795 and converted her into a warship. Glatton was unusual in that for a time she was the only ship-of-the-line that the Royal Navy had armed exclusively with carronades. (Eventually she returned to a more conventional armament of guns and carronades.) She served in the North Sea and the Baltic, and as a transport for convicts to Australia. She then returned to naval service in the Mediterranean. After the end of the Napoleonic Wars the Admiralty converted her to a water depot at Sheerness. In 1830 the Admiralty converted Glatton to a breakwater and sank her at Harwich.

== East India Company service ==
In 1793-4 Glatton made one round trip to China for the East India Company (EIC). Her captain was Charles Drummond and her first lieutenant was William Macnamarra. Drummond had commanded an earlier Glatton and would command a later one too; Macnamarra too would go on to command a later Glatton on a trip to China for the EIC.

Glatton's letter of marque was dated 22 August 1793. The letter of marque permitted her, while under Drummond's command, to assist in the capture of the French brig Le Franc. It was issued after Glatton had left Portsmouth on 22 May 1793. Glatton was part of a convoy that also included the East Indiamen Prince William, Lord Thurlow, William Pitt, Barwell, Earl of Oxford, Osterley, Fort William, London, Pigot, Houghton, Marquis of Landsdown, Hillsborough, Ceres, and Earl of Abergavenny, amongst numerous other vessels, merchant and military, most of the non-Indiamen travelling to the Mediterranean.

From Portsmouth, Glatton reached Manilla on 10 November, and then Whampoa two weeks later. On her return voyage, she crossed Second Bar on 17 February 1794, reached St Helena on 18 June, and Long Reach by 12 September.

== Fitting out for Royal Navy service ==
Captain Henry Trollope commissioned her in April 1795 and he was responsible for arranging that her original armament consisted entirely of carronades instead of the standard mix of long guns and carronades that other warships carried. His previous command, some eight years earlier, had been the 44-gun Rainbow, which too had been armed entirely with carronades. With her Trollope had in 1782 taken the Hébé, which the British would go to use as the model for the Leda-class frigates.

Carronades had short, relatively thin barrels and so were half the weight of the equivalent cannon. They did not need as large gun crews and could also fire much heavier shot for their weight than a gun of the same overall weight, but at the cost of the accuracy, velocity and range of the shot. This extremely heavy armament meant that the fourth rate Glatton could discharge a heavier broadside than the first rate Victory. But, in combat Glatton would have to endure the fire of the enemy's long guns while closing the gap to point-blank range before she could effectively return fire — if indeed the enemy would allow her to approach so close.

Glatton was originally armed with twenty-eight 68-pounder carronades on the lower deck and twenty-eight 42-pounder carronades on her upper deck. All were non-recoil, which is to say that they were fixed to the deck. Within a month 32-pounder carronades replaced the 42-pounders. However, Glatton's ports were too small to allow the larger guns to traverse properly, and she had no bow or stern chasers. Her guns therefore could only be pointed straight out the side. The month after the action in July 1796 (see below), she received two 32-pounders and two 18-pounder carronades for her forecastle. Later, the Navy replaced the twenty-eight 68-pounder carronades on the lower deck with twenty-eight 18-pounder long guns, ending the experiment.

Trollope was extremely happy with Glatton's seaworthiness, handling and general fitting out. He wrote to John Wells, the shipbuilder and her former owner, "I sincerely hope... we may meet with a seventy four in the Glatton...she would either take her or sink her in twenty minutes."

== North Sea and Baltic ==
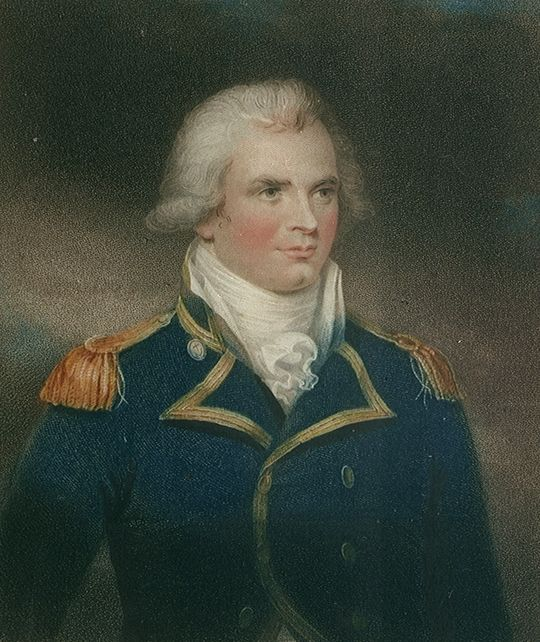
Captain Sir Henry Trollope

Under Trollope, Glatton first served in the English Channel where she engaged a French squadron on 15 July 1796. The French squadron consisted of a 50-gun ship, five frigates (two of 36 guns and three of 28), a brig, and a cutter. Glatton drove the French vessels into Flushing, having lost only two men wounded, one of whom died later, and despite having at times been surrounded by the enemy and exchanging fire at less than 20 yards. The French vessels may have included Brutus (a 74-gun cut down to 46-50 guns), Incorruptible (50 guns), Magicienne (32 guns), and Républicaine, and one French vessel apparently sunk in Flushing harbour. (It was in this action that Captain Strangeways of the Royal Marines sustained the wound of which he died shortly thereafter, and which the illustration above commemorates.) In March–April 1797, Trollope kept Glatton's crew from joining the Nore mutiny. By threatening to fire on the 64-gun Overyssel and the 40-gun Beaulieu, which were in open mutiny, he convinced their crews to return to duty. In August Captain Charles Cobb took command.

In April and May 1798 Glatton participated, with many other vessels, in the capture of sundry Dutch doggers, schuyts, and fishing vessels. On 4 and 5 May Glatton was among the vessels that captured 12 outward-bound Greenland ships. The other vessels included the hired armed cutters Fox and Marshall Cobourg, though most were much larger and included Monmouth, Ganges, Director, America, among others. On 28 May Glatton, Monarch, Ganges, America, Veteran, Belliqueux, Director, Apollo, the hired armed cutters Fox the First, and Rose when they captured Janus. All the British vessels were part of the fleet under the command of Admiral Lord Duncan. Next, many of the same vessels, including Glatton, Proserpine, Fox the First and Rose, captured several more Dutch vessels:

- Hoop (6 June);
- Stadt Embden (11 June);
- Neptune (12 June);
- Rose and Endrast (14 June);
- Hoop (15 June); and
- Vrow Dorothea (16 June).

On 18 August 1798, Glatton, Veteran, Belliqueux, Monmouth, Kent, Ganges, Prince Frederick, Diomede, the sloop Busy, and the hired armed cutter Rose captured Adelarde. Glatton was with other ships from Duncan's fleet, including Astraea, Scorpion, Cruizer, the hired armed lugger Rover, and cutters Liberty and Hazard, when they captured Harmenie on 21 April 1799. Glatton was in company with Kent, Romney, Isis and Ranger when they captured the Dutch hoy Johanna on 16 May 1799.

Then in August 1799, Glatton participated in the Anglo-Russian invasion of Holland. The expedition was under the command of Admiral Adam Duncan and the Duke of York. Some 250 craft of all sizes transported 17,000 troops from Margate Roads and the Downs across the Channel on 13 August. Due to bad weather it was 21 August before they anchored off Kijkduin. The next day Vice Admiral Mitchell sent a summons to Vice Admiral Samuel Story, calling on him to surrender his fleet. When he declined, the Duke of York landed his army near Den Helder on 27 August under covering fire from the fleet. Den Helder was occupied the following day when the garrison evacuated the town. The expedition then took possession of 13 old warships laid up in ordinary. On 30 August, Glatton, Romney, Isis, Veteran, Ardent, Belliqueux, Monmouth and Overyssel, the Russian ship Mistisloff and the frigates, anchored in line ahead in the Vlieter and Mitchel again summoned Story. This time Story agreed to surrender his squadron of 12 modern warships. The Royal Navy purchased 11 of these. The Dutch surrender, without any resistance, became known as the Vlieter Incident. As a result of the surrender, Duncan's fleet was awarded prize money, in which Glatton shared. (Note: An initial distribution of prize money resulted in a payment of 6s 8d to each ordinary seaman.)

On 15 January 1800 a court martial on board Glatton, in Yarmouth Roads, tried Lieutenant James Watson, and the surviving officers and crew for the loss on the Cockle Sands of the 12-gun brig Mastiff as she left Yarmouth Roads via the Northern Passage for Leith. Eight of the crew had been lost in the incident. The court absolved Watson, his officers, and men for the loss of the vessel, and praised their conduct after the wrecking. (Note: On 7 April 1800 the Lords of the Admiralty awarded 150 guineas to the fishermen from Winterton who risked their lives to save 30 crew men. The first two men who volunteered each received 25 guineas.)

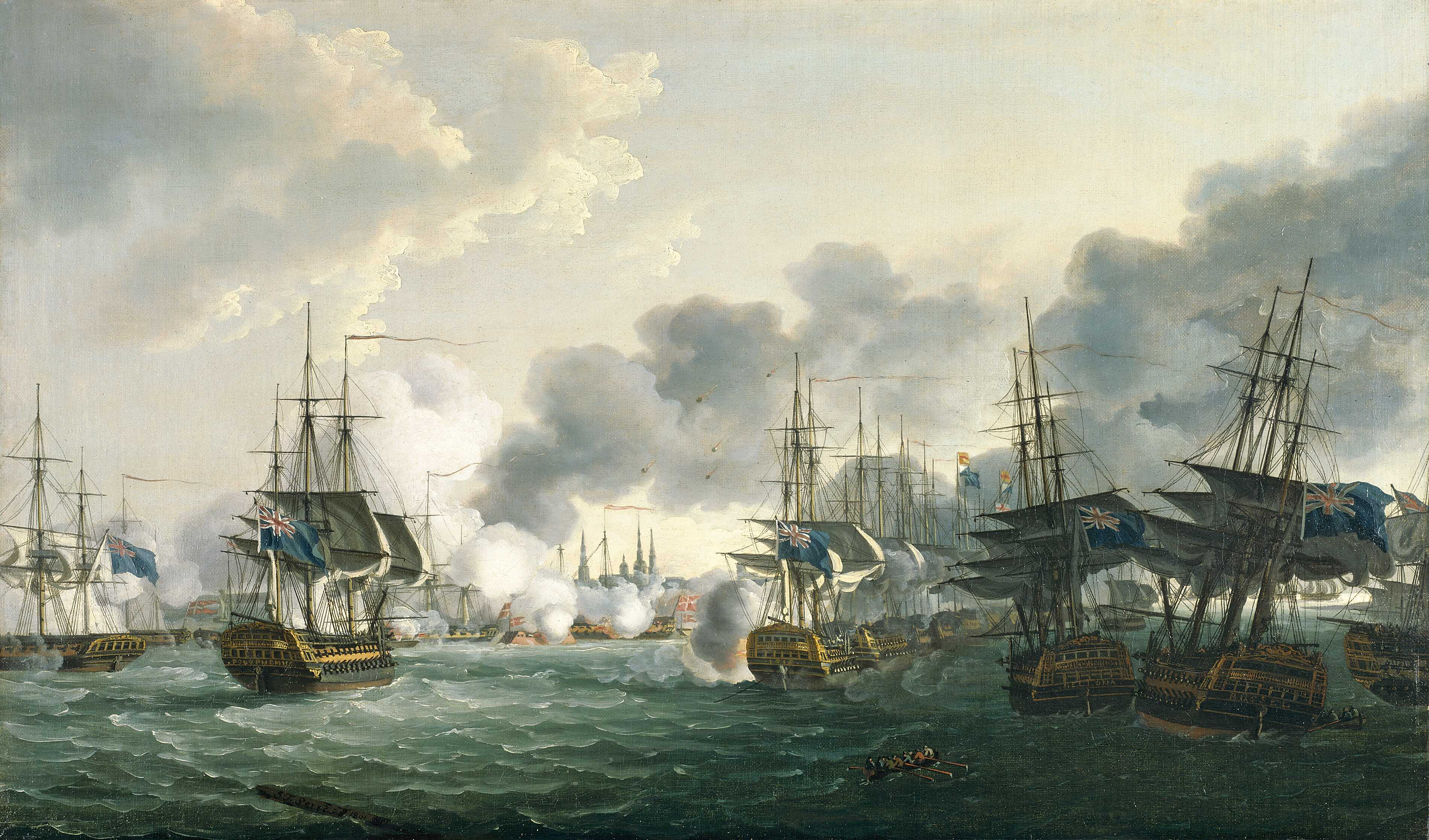
Glatton at Copenhagen, 1801

In November, Captain George Stephen took command of Glatton, followed in 1801 by Captain William Bligh, formerly of HMS Bounty. Bligh was only captain for about a month, but during that month he sailed her to the Baltic where Glatton participated in the Battle of Copenhagen on 2 April 1801. The battle cost her 17 killed and 34 wounded. In 1847 the Admiralty would award the Naval General Service Medal with clasp "Copenhagen 1801" to all surviving claimants from the action. Glatton was next under Captain William Nowell and then under Captain William Birchall. In August 1801 she was fitted at Sheerness for a guardship in protected waters. Captain John Ferris Devonshire took command that same month.

== Convict transport to Australia ==
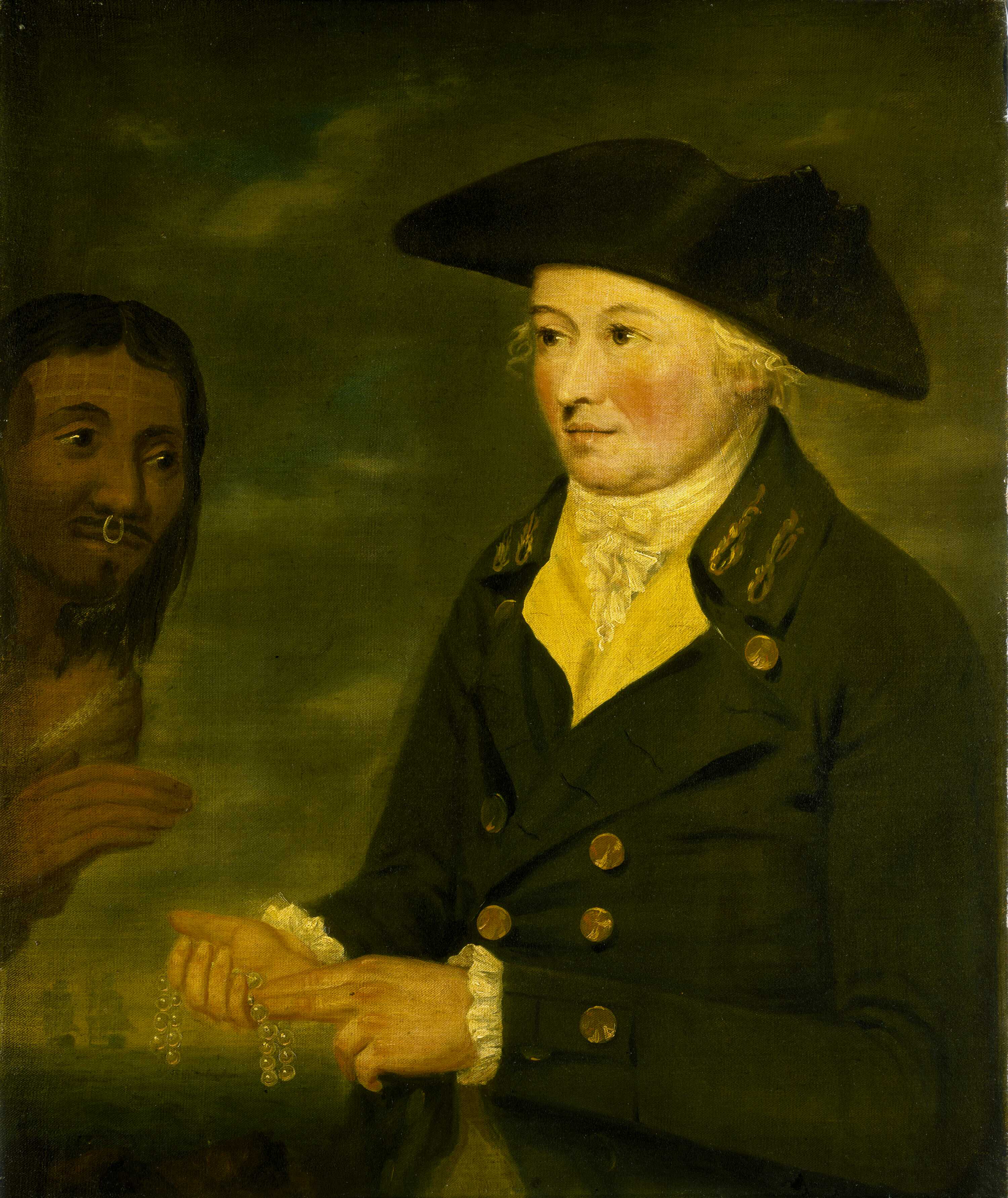
Captain Nathaniel Portlock

Captain Nathaniel Portlock recommissioned her in May 1802 as a convict ship. Next, Commander James Colnett assumed command and on 23 September Glatton left England, carrying over 270 male, and 135 female prisoners; of these, seven men and five women died on the journey. She also carried some 30 Free Settlers. A family from the Royal Household boarded the Glatton - this was one of the reasons a Royal Navy vessel was used, to ensure a safe passage. She sailed via a resupply stop at Rio de Janeiro to the penal settlement at Sydney, where she arrived on 13 March 1803. When Glatton arrived about 100 of the people on board her were suffering to varying degrees from scurvy.

She then returned to England, arriving on 22 September 1803, that is, after an absence of 364 days. Because she returned via Cape Horn, she had circumnavigated the world; her actual time at sea for this transit was 277 days.

Glatton was one of only two Royal Navy ships used to transport convicts to Port Jackson.

== Return to naval service ==
Between November and December 1803 she was refitted at Woolwich for service as a man-of-war. Still under Colnett's command, she then served briefly as flagship for Rear Admiral James Vashon.

In 1804 Glatton was reduced to a 44-gun fifth rate. On 11 November she, together with Eagle, Majestic, Princess of Orange, Raisonable, Africiane, Inspector, Beaver, the hired armed cutter Swift, and the hired armed lugger Agnes, shared in the capture of Upstalsboom, H.L. De Haase, Master. (Note: The prize money for a seaman was 10d.)

Captain Thomas Seccombe recommissioned Glatton in March 1806 and sailed for the Mediterranean on 22 November. On 19 February 1807, Glatton captured the Turkish vessels San Giovanni Pidomias and Codro Mariolo. That same day Glatton and Hirondelle captured the San Michelle. Four days later, Hirondelle captured Madonna, with Glatton sharing by agreement. (Note: Unfortunately, the prize agent for the vessel went bankrupt in 1816. As a result, the fourth and final payment of prize money was not paid out until July 1850. At that time, a first-class share was worth £4 14s 5 1/2d; a fifth-class share was worth 3 3/4d. The payments represented 5 1/4d per £1 that the prize agents had owed.) On 26 February Hirondelle captured the San Nicollo, and Glatton again shared by agreement.

On 1 March, boats from Glatton cut out a former French corvette in Turkish service from the port of Sigri on the island of Mitylene. The vessel was pierced for 18 guns but only 10 were mounted. The British boarding party lost five officers and men killed and nine men wounded. Hirondelle provided support.

The next day Glatton and Hirondelle captured three other Turkish vessels, names unknown but with masters, Statio, Constantine, and Papeli. Prize money for these vessels, and San Michelle, was paid in October 1816. (Note: A first-class share for San Michelle and two merchantmen was worth £25 4s 9 1/2d; a fifth-class share was worth 1s 9d. The prize money for the third merchantman was much better. A first-class share was worth £323 2s 0 1/2d; a fifth-class share was worth £1 2s 8d.)

On 4 March Glatton and Hirondelle captured another Turkish vessel. (Note: As in the case of Madonna, the fourth and final payment was paid in July 1850. A first-class share was worth 11s 8 1/2d; a fifth-class share was worth 1/2d.) One week later, Glatton captured yet another Turkish vessel, name unknown, Ibrahim, master. (Note: More than 12 years later, the prize money for a seaman for San Giovanni Pidomias and Codro Mariolo was £1 2s 4d, and for the vessel with the unknown name it was £7 7s 7d.)

Then on 29 November Glatton captured several transports off Corfu that were transferring troops from Otranto to Corfu. Glatton removed some 300 troops before she destroyed the nine vessels they had been on. Two vessels escaped back to Otranto.

Glatton and the brig-sloop Delight had received information that the French had captured four Sicilian gunboats and taken them into Scylla, near Reggio, Calabria. On 31 January 1808, as Delight approached the port, a strong current pushed her towards the shore and she grounded. Seccombe went on board Delight to supervise the recovery effort. As they were trying to free Delight, her boats and those of Glatton came under intense fire from the shore. The boats were unsuccessful in freeing Delight, and Delight's captain, Commander Phillip Crosby Handfield, late of Egyptienne, and many of his crew were killed. Although the crew took to the boats, not all were able to escape and a number of the men on her, including Seccombe, became prisoners of war. The French paroled Seccombe, who had been severely wounded, to Messina, where he died on 3 February 1808.

Glatton came under the command of Commander Henry Hope (acting) and in March 1808 under Commander Charles Irving (acting). Captain George Miller Bligh then took command around December. He brought a convoy home from Malta in July and then sailed her to Sheerness for laying up in October. She sailed briefly to the Baltic in 1811.

== Fate ==
From 1812 to 1814 Glatton was under R. G. Peacock (master) at Portsmouth. In 1814 she was converted to serve as a water depot at Sheerness. Between April and June 1830 she was fitted at Sheerness as a breakwater, and in October 1830 Glatton sailed for the last time, to Harwich, where she was subsequently scuttled to serve as a breakwater.
