= HMS Spider (1782) =

Brig of the Royal Navy

History

France
- Name: Victoire
- Builder: Dunkirk
- Launched: 1782
- Captured: 18 June 1782

Great Britain
- Name: HMS Spider
- Acquired: 18 June 1782 by capture
- Honours and awards: Naval General Service Medal with clasp "Egypt"
- Fate: Sold 1806

General characteristics
- Tons burthen: 169 32/94 (bm)
- Length: 69 ft 0 in (21.0 m) (overall; 54 ft 1 3/4 in (16.5 m) (keel)
- Beam: 24 ft 3 in (7.4 m)
- Depth of hold: 10 ft 7 in (3.2 m)
- Sail plan: Schooner, though occasionally referred to as a cutter
- Complement: French privateer: 91 when captured; British Royal Navy: 50
- Armament: French privateer: 2 × 8-pounder + 14 × 6-pounder guns; British Royal Navy: 12 × 4-pounder guns

HMS Spider was formerly the French privateer Victoire, built at Dunkirk in 1782, that the Royal Navy captured that same year. The Navy commissioned her as Spider. She served during both the French Revolutionary and early Napoleonic Wars, capturing some five French privateers before being sold at Malta in 1806 for breaking up.

== Capture ==
Stag captured Victoire off the Irish coast on 18 June 1782 after a chase of 11 hours. At the time, she was armed with two 8-pounder and fourteen 6-pounder guns (six of which she threw over-board during the chase), and had a crew of 91 men.

== Between the wars ==
Victoire was already copper sheathed, but still the Royal Navy had her fitted at Plymouth for service in the Channel. Between October 1782 and 26 January 1784 she received metal braces while also on active duty. In British service she was much more lightly armed and crewed than she had been as a privateer.

Spider was commissioned in May 1783 for the Holyhead station under the command of Lieutenant Nichiolas Rooke. Rooke. She was paid off in June 1786, but immediately recommissioned under the command of Lieutenant Edward Edmonston. She was paid off in 1787, and apparently not recommissioned until October 1788, when Lieutenant Samuel Edwards assumed command. In 1790 Lieutenant William Layton replaced Edwards.

== French Revolutionary Wars ==
Spider brought into Plymouth around 15 March 1793 the French privateer Sans-Culottes, as well as her prize, Susan, Cheater, master. Susan, of Pool, had been sailing from Alicante when captured. Spider captured Sans Culotte and recaptured Susan some seven leagues west of Guernsey on 5 March. Sans-Culotte was a 15-ton and 20-man privateer from Saint-Malo, commissioned in 1793 under Captain Eudes. At capture, Sans Culottes was armed with 12 swivel guns and had a crew of 22 men.

At some point in 1795, Spider captured the privateer Desiree.

In 1796 Lieutenant William Bevians replaced Layton. Then between January and April 1797 Spider underwent fitting as a schooner. Lieutenant Digby Dent assumed command.

On 16 May 1797 Spider repulsed an attack by a French privateer lugger. Spider then captured the French privateer Flibustier, of Saint-Malo. (Note: Flibustier had been commissioned in either 1796 or '97 under J.-M. Capel. She was of 50 tons and had a complement of 40-70 men.) Spider was seven leagues south of The Lizard when she sighted and gave chase to a brig. After a chase of three hours, punctuated by fire from the quarry's stern chasers, Spider caught up with the brig just under the Lizard. By one account Flibustier was armed with 16 guns and had a crew of 67 men. Lieutenant Digby Dent, in his after-action letter, described her as having 14 guns (four of which she threw overboard during the chase), and a crew of 70 men under the command of Henry Capel. She was 11 days out of Saint-Malo but had not made any captures. Spider brought her into Plymouth.

Lieutenant Richard Harrison assumed command of Spider in February 1798. (Note: Although one source gives Harrison's given name as James, other sources show his given name as Richard.) On 25 July 1799 Two Brothers, Drew, master, arrived at Plymouth. She had been smuggling 500 ankers of spirits when Spider captured her.

In September he was at the Isle of Man where he impressed 50 herring fisherman, devastating the local trade and arousing a great local furor. The press gang was a long-standing grievance on the Isle.

On 10 March 1799, Harrison brought into Falmouth some useful intelligence. That day he had detained a Prussian vessel. She had as a passenger an American who had been the master of a vessel that a French privateer had captured. The American reported that on 27 February 12 French frigates, transports, and supply ships, together with a number of troops, had sailed from Bordeaux for Brest. The next day, 18 more had sailed. Although the Lords of the Admiralty thought it unlikely that the flotilla was headed for Ireland, they thought it prudent to reinforce Admiral Kingsmill's squadron there with three vessels, Russell, Phoebe, and Proselyte.

On 12 June 1800 Spider brought into Plymouth the lugger Expedition. She was a Cornish vessel, from Polperro, and was returning to Britain with 900 ankers of brandy, as well as tobacco and other smuggled goods.

Although it is not clear when Spider sailed to the Mediterranean, Spider is listed as having served in the navy's Egyptian campaign (8 March to 2 September 1801). Consequently, her officers and crew qualified for the clasp "Egypt" to the Naval General Service Medal, which the Admiralty issued in 1847 to all surviving claimants.

Spiderarrive at Plymouth Sound on 2 September 1801 after a voyage of ten weeks from Alexandria. She had as a passenger Captain Young, of the Royal Navy, who was carrying dispatches. Young landed and took a four-horse post chaise for London to deliver dispatches that he was carrying.

In August 1802 Lieutenant George Ravenscroft took temporary command of Spider. Next month, Lieutenant Harding Shaw replaced Ravenscroft. He sailed her for the Mediterranean on 22 November.

== Napoleonic Wars ==
In the Mediterranean, Admiral Lord Nelson, commander in chief in the Mediterranean, used Spider to carry messages to and from Malta. including to Corfu and Constantinople.

Around mid-1803 Spider captured a vessel that she then had to give up, presumably on the grounds that it was allied or neutral. This may or may not have been related to Shaw's having, with two English merchantmen, recaptured three English vessels in the harbour at Girgenti or Grigenti (probably Agrigento), brought there by two French privateers. Nelson deferred a judgement on the correctness of Shaw's action to Sir Alexander Ball, the chief commissioner at Malta. (Later (i.e., by June 1804), Nelson fully endorsed Shaw's action, complaining that the Sicilian Government and that of the Republic of the Seven Islands were too free in letting French privateers use their ports.)

Then in a letter dated 5 November 1803, Nelson ordered Spider refitted because she was in a "miserable state". Refitting was complete by 22 December.

18 February 1804 she was at Saragosa.

On 9 July 1804, Shaw and Spider captured the Ragusan brig Madonna del Rosario. She had been carrying a cargo of oil from Canea, Island of Candia (Crete), to Marseilles.

On 5 September Shaw had a seaman flogged, apparently disturbing some of the crew. (Given the ubiquity of flogging in the Royal Navy, that the crew was disturbed suggests that some unfairness may have been involved.) Someone then threw a round-shot that landed near Shaw and the master, Mr. Langdon. When no-one would confess to having thrown the shot, Shaw had all the seamen given 12 lashes. On 6 September he wrote to reporting the situation. On 4 October, Nelson wrote back, admonishing Shaw. Nelson wrote, "I cannot approve of a measure so foreign to the rules of good discipline and the accustomed rules of his Majesty's Navy, and therefore caution you against a similar line of conduct."

On 11 September, Lieutenant Harding Shaw and Spider were about three leagues from Alicante when they captured the French privateer Conception, of two brass guns and 47 men. Conception had been fitted out Ajacia, in Corsica, which she had left about a month earlier. The day before her capture she had left Grigenti. In the month she had been out she had made no captures. Shaw put 33 prisoners ashore at Alicante. (Note: Conception was a privateer gondola sic commissioned at Ajaccio in 1801. In addition to her two guns she originally carried eight swivel guns. Apparently the British had captured her on 24 April 1804, but her crew had retaken her.)

On 4 October Nelson wrote Shaw a second letter. Nelson had received a letter from Mr. Langdon alleging that Shaw had issued him certificates for pilot services (payment instructions), and demanded back half the pilotage charge. Nelson asked for an accounting of all such certificates in order to decide whether to open a public inquiry into Shaw's conduct. He also instructed Shaw not to pay for any more pilotage services except in extraordinary circumstances as in Nelson's opinion, Shaw was familiar with all the ports he might visit.

Spider captured the French privateer Andromeda, of four guns and 43 men on 10 December 1805, cutting her out of the port of Reggio. She shared the prize money for the capture with Hirondelle. (Note: Andromeda was commissioned in 1805, and was probably of Italian origin.)

== Fate ==
Spider was paid off at Malta in February 1806, and sold there later in the year.
