= HMS Eagle (1804) =

Ship of the line of the Royal Navy

- Plan drawing of Eagle

History

United Kingdom
- Name: Eagle
- Ordered: 4 February 1800
- Builder: Pitcher, Northfleet
- Laid down: August 1800
- Launched: 27 February 1804
- Renamed: Eaglet, 1918
- Reclassified: As a training ship, 1860
- Fate: Burnt, 1926

General characteristics
- Class & type: Repulse-class ship of the line
- Tons burthen: 1,723 21/94 (bm)
- Length: 174 ft (53 m) (gundeck)
- Beam: 47 ft 7 in (14.5 m)
- Draught: 17 ft 6 in (5.3 m) (light)
- Depth of hold: 20 ft (6.1 m)
- Sail plan: Full-rigged ship
- Complement: 590
- Armament: 74 muzzle-loading, smoothbore guns; Gundeck: 28 × 32 pdr guns; Upper deck: 28 × 18 pdr guns; Quarterdeck: 2 × 18 pdr guns + 12 × 32 pdr carronades; Forecastle: 2 × 18 pdr guns + 2 × 32 pdr carronades; Poop deck: 6 × 18 pdr carronades

HMS Eagle was a 74-gun third-rate Repulse-class ship of the line built for the Royal Navy in the first decade of the 19th century. Completed in 1804, she played a minor role in the Napoleonic Wars.

== Description ==
Eagle measured 174 feet (53 m) on the gundeck and 143 feet 1 inch (43.6 m) on the keel. She had a beam of 47 feet 7 inches (14.5 m), a depth of hold of 20 feet (6.1 m) and had a tonnage of 1,723 21/94 tons burthen. The ship's draught was 13 feet 3 inches (4.0 m) forward and 17 feet 6 inches (5.3 m) aft at light load; fully loaded, her draught would be significantly deeper. The Repulse-class ships were armed with 74 muzzle-loading, smoothbore guns that consisted of twenty-eight 32-pounder guns on her lower gundeck and twenty-eight 18-pounder guns on her upper gundeck. Their forecastle mounted a pair of 18-pounder guns and two 32-pounder carronades. On their quarterdeck they carried two 18-pounders and a dozen 32-pounder carronades. Above the quarterdeck was their poop deck with half-a-dozen 18-pounder carronades. Their crew numbered 590 officers and ratings. The ships were fitted with three masts and ship-rigged.

== Construction and career ==
HMS Eagle was the fourteenth ship of her name to serve in the Royal Navy. She was ordered on 4 February 1800 from Thomas Pitcher as part of the first batch of three Repulse-class ships of the line designed by Sir William Rule, co-Surveyor of the Navy. The ship was laid down at Pitcher's shipyard in Northfleet in August and was launched on 27 February 1804. She was commissioned by Captain David Colby that same month. On 31 March, she was driven ashore and severely damaged at Northfleet. She was taken into dock for repairs. Eagle was completed at Woolwich Dockyard on 3 May.

On 11 November 1804, Glatton, together with Eagle, Majestic, Princess of Orange, Raisonable, Africiane, Inspector, Beaver, and the hired armed vessels Swift and Agnes, shared in the capture of the Upstalsboom, H.L. De Haase, Master. (Note: The prize money for an ordinary seaman was 10d.)

In 1805 Charles Rowley was given command of HMS Eagle and took her on the Walcheren Campaign in 1809 and, during the War of the Sixth Coalition, took part in the capture of Fiume and of Trieste in 1813.

On 10 November 1813, Eagle set sail from Trieste, accompanied by Tremendous and Wizard, conveying British and Austrian troops.

Eagle returned to the Downs in early 1814. In January 1815 she was in Chatham dockyard undergoing repair. In 1830 she was reduced to a 50-gun ship. In November 1844 Capt. George B. Martin commissioned her for service on the West Indies and North American station. She was back in Devonport by 1848. In 1860 she was employed by the Coast Guard service at Milford Haven.

She was renamed HMS Eaglet in 1918, when she was the Royal Naval Reserve training centre for North West England. A fire destroyed Eagle in 1926.

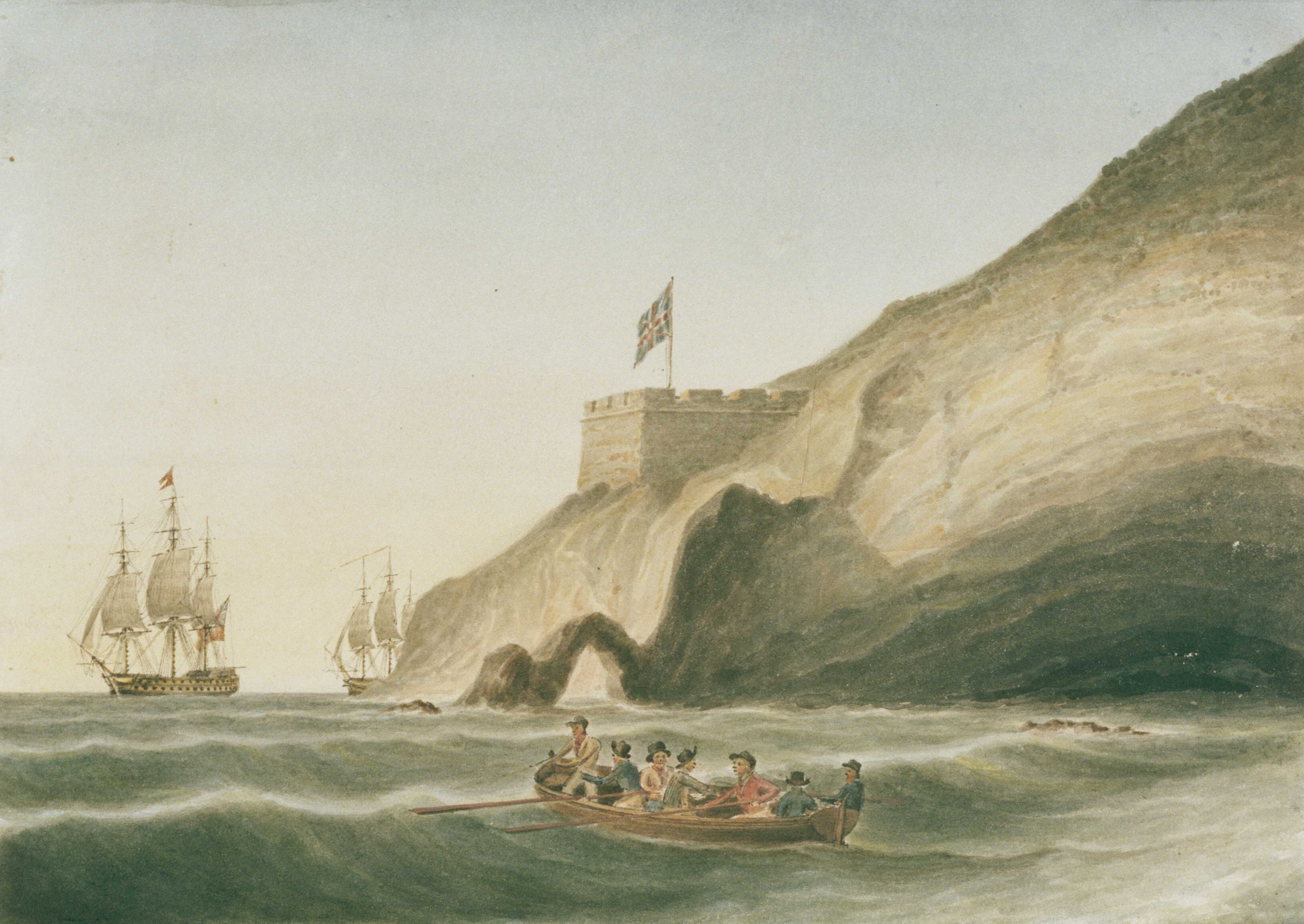
Eagle and Fort Munden, seen from the Landing Place, St Helena, painting by William Innes Pocock, a lieutenant onboard

== Bibliography ==
- Colledge, J. J.; Warlow, Ben & Bush, Steve (2020). Ships of the Royal Navy: The Complete Record of all Fighting Ships of the Royal Navy from the 15th Century to the Present (5th revised and updated ed.). Seaforth Publishing. ISBN 978-1-5267-9327-0.
- Lavery, Brian (1984). The Ship of the Line. Vol. 1: The Development of the Battlefleet 1650-1850. Naval Institute Press. ISBN 0-85177-252-8.
- Winfield, Rif (2008). British Warships in the Age of Sail 1793–1817: Design, Construction, Careers and Fates (2nd, revised ed.). Seaforth. ISBN 978-1-84415-717-4.
- Winfield, Rif (2014). British Warships in the Age of Sail 1817–1863: Design, Construction, Careers and Fates. Seaforth Publishing. ISBN 978-1-84832-169-4.
