= French frigate Africaine (1798) =

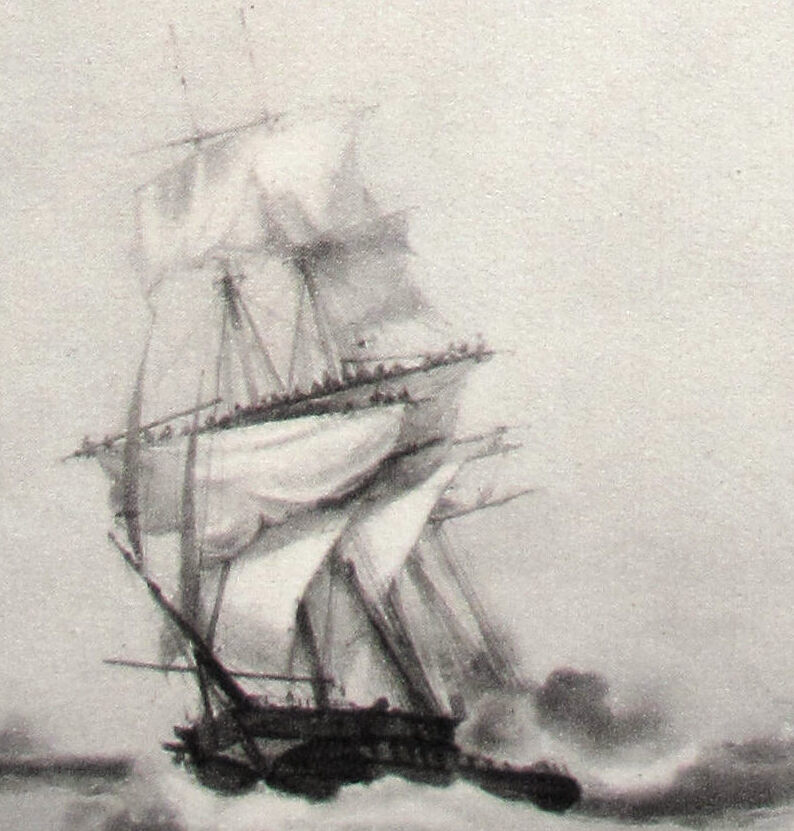
- Painting of Africaine by Jean-Baptiste Henri Durand-Brager

History

France
- Name: Africaine
- Namesake: Africa
- Builder: Rochefort
- Laid down: March 1795
- Launched: 3 January 1798
- Commissioned: May 1798
- Captured: 19 February 1801

United Kingdom
- Name: Africaine
- Acquired: Captured, 19 February 1801
- Fate: Broken up, 1816

General characteristics
- Class & type: Preneuse-class frigate
- Displacement: 1400 tonneaux
- Tons burthen: 722 port tonneaux
- Length: 47.8 m (157 ft)
- Beam: 11.9 m (39 ft)
- Draught: 5.8 m (19 ft)
- Propulsion: Sail
- Armament: French service: 28 × 18-pounder long guns; 12 × 8-pounder long guns; British service: UD: 28 × 18-pounder guns; QD: 14 × 32-pounder carronades; Fc: 2 × 9-pounder guns + 2 × 32-pounder carronades
- Armour: Timber

Africaine was one of two 40-gun Preneuse-class frigates of the French Navy built to a design by Raymond-Antoine Haran. She carried twenty-eight 18-pounder and twelve 8-pounder guns. The British captured her in 1801, only to have the French recapture her in 1810. They abandoned her at sea as she had been demasted and badly damaged, with the result that the British recaptured her the next day. She was broken up in 1816.

== French service ==
Africaine was commissioned on 14 September 1799 under Capitaine de frégate Magendie. In 1800, she sailed to Saint-Domingue transporting government officials and army officers, arriving in late April or early May. She later sailed from Rochefort with Régénérée to try to resupply the French forces in Egypt. She was carrying ordnance, stores and 400 soldiers to Napoleon's army in Egypt.

At the action of 19 February 1801, HMS Phoebe, under Captain Robert Barlow, captured Africaine east of Gibraltar. Phoebe, which had the weather gage, overtook Africaine and engaged her at close range, despite the French soldiers, who augmented the frigate's guns with their musket fire. Phoebe's guns inflicted more than 340 casualties on Africaine before she struck at 9:30PM. The Royal Navy took her into service as HMS Africaine.

== British service: the English Channel ==
Africaine was commissioned under Commander J. Stewart in April. Then in July Captain Stevenson took command, only to be replaced in September by Captain George Burlton. On 31 January 1802 she arrived in Portsmouth from Malta and sailed again to Chatham on 7 February to be paid off before being re-fitted. She arrived in at Deptford on 17 February 1802 for refitting.

In November Captain Thomas Manby took command, though Africaine was not yet ready. When Earl St. Vincent gave Manby the appointment St. Vincent said that he did not like to see an active officer idle on shore. He had a point as while Manby was waiting for the vessel to be ready Lady Townshend presented him to Caroline, the Princess of Wales, who became friendly towards him. Rumours abounded that the Princess became too familiar with Manby and that Manby was even the father of one of her children. An investigation followed during which Manby swore an affidavit on 22 September 1806 that the rumours were "a vile and wicked invention, wholly and absolutely false".

Africaine was commissioned at Deptford for the North Sea in 1803. On his way to the Nore, Manby stopped at Gravesend where he landed a press gang. Between midnight and sunrise they garnered 398 seamen. From the Nore she sailed to Hellevoetsluis where there were two French frigates; Africaine maintained a blockade there for two years until the French dismantled the frigates.

One day while Africaine was maintaining this blockade, the French general at Scheveningen had four boys shrimping in Africaine's jolly boat fired upon. Manby immediately seized sixty fishing boats that he then sent to Yarmouth. (Note: In July 1807 Africaine was awarded prize money for sundry fishing boats captured in May 1803. She shared the prize money with the hired armed cutter Duke of Clarence.) This cost The Hague its supplies of fish for some weeks. At the end of June, 34 French fishing boats came into Portsmouth that were prizes to Africaine and Topaze.

Also, on 20 July 1803, Africaine's First Lieutenant, William Henry Dillon, landed at Hellevoetsluis in a boat from Leda under a flag of truce. The Dutch commodore there detained Dillon until men from Furieuse could take him prisoner. Dillon caught a fever that almost killed him while he was on board Furieuse; when he was well again the French transferred him to their prison camp at Verdun. There he remained until September 1807 when he was exchanged.

On 1 August 1803 a lightning strike on the foremast killed one man and injured three others. Manby sailed from Yarmouth on 4 October 1804 to deliver Rear Admiral Thomas Macnamara Russell out to Eagle, one of the vessels of the British flotilla watching the Dutch fleet at Texel. Manby returned on 7 October with Rear Admiral Edward Thornbrough. While she was serving in the blockade off Texel, a gale caused part of Africaine's rudder to break off, which then damaged the stern post. Glatton had to escort Africaine to Yarmouth, where winds almost drove Africaine ashore; her crew had to cut away all her masts to save her.

On 31 December a court martial took place in Sheerness on Africaine to try Captain the Honorable John Colville, the officers and ship's company of HMS Romney for the loss of their ship off Texel on 19 November. (Note: Colville and his officers were honourably acquitted. However, the court ordered that the pilots forfeit all their pay, never again pilot any of his Majesty's ships or vessels of war, and that one should be imprisoned in the Marshalsea for a year and the other for six months.)

In mid June, 1804 Africaine captured several Dutch fishing vessels off Helvoetsluys. Much to Manby's surprise he found some members of the Dutch crews to be from Faversham in Kent. Manby arrested one of the Englishmen, the master of one of the vessels, and promptly handed him over to the Secretary of State's Office, for examination in England. (Note: "One day last week the Africaine frigate fell in with several fishing vessels off Helvoetsluys, which she supposed to be all Dutch. On bearing up for the purpose of examining them, some of them attempted to run ashore. The crew of one of the vessels, finding the impossibility of effecting their purpose in time, all left her except the master, and made their escape on the Dutch coast, by means of a small boat which they had alongside. When the Africaine took possession of this vessel, the Captain was surprised to find her an English fishing-vessel from Feversham: this circumstance, together with the mystery of the Englishmen quitting her, induced him to make the master a prisoner, and to send the twelve Dutch fishing-vessels, which he took in Company, to Yarmouth. The master of the Feversham vessel was, at the first opportunity, sent to the flag-ship at the Nore, where he remained till Thursday, when he was conveyed to the Secretary of State's Office, in order to be examined.)

On 11 November 1804, Glatton, together with Eagle, Majestic, Princess of Orange, Raisonable, Africiane, Inspector, Beaver, and the hired armed vessels Swift and Agnes, shared in the capture of Upstalsboom, H.L. De Haase, Master. (Note: The prize money for an ordinary seaman was 10d.)

In May 1805 Africaine was on the Irish Station. She was then re-fitted at Sheerness and escorted a large convoy to the West Indies on 19 June 1805, calling at Suriname, Demerara, and various islands. When she arrived in Barbados her crew of 340 men were all healthy. Then Sir Alexander Cochrane had her return to England with invalids from the hospitals in Barbados as passengers. Within two days of leaving Barbados, yellow fever broke out on board Africaine. The surgeon and the assistant surgeon died on the second day; Manby himself carried out their duties dispensing, large doses of calomel on the advice of a doctor at St Kitts. Manby had an attack of the fever and it affected his subsequent health. In all, fever killed one third of the crew of 340 men during the six weeks it took to reach Falmouth. Africaine spent almost six weeks in quarantine off the Scilly Islands. She then was taken out of commission at Sheerness.

In early 1807, Africaine fitted out at Chatham. Later, at Plymouth, Captain Richard Raggett took command. On 5 July 1807 Africaine sailed from England with General Lord William Cathcart to Swedish Pomerania where King Gustavus was defending his territory against an invading French army. Cathcart would take command of the land-forces for the forthcoming siege and bombardment of Copenhagen.

Africaine arrived at the island of Rügen on 12 August where she joined Admiral Gambier's fleet for the attack on Copenhagen. Africaine's boat operated as part of the advanced squadron and had one man wounded in an action on 23 August. As part of the capitulation, the Danes surrendered their fleet. A prize crew from Africaine took the captured Danish frigate Iris into the Medway.

By 24 December she was at Madeira, having accompanied Sir Samuel Hood there. The British occupation was a friendly affair and the garrison surrendered without resistance on 26 September.

On 11 January 1808 Africaine captured the Spanish felucca Paloma. Africaine then sailed to the Baltic to serve under Vice-Admiral Sir James Saumarez.

== East Indies: capture and recapture ==
In spring 1810, Africaine had returned to Plymouth from Annapolis after having delivered Mr. Jackson, the British ambassador to the United States. During this period the crew threatened mutiny when informed that Captain Robert Corbet, who had a reputation for brutality, was to take command of Africaine. The Navy quickly suppressed the incipient mutiny and Africaine sailed for the East Indies with Corbet in command. During the voyage Corbet reportedly failed to train his men in the accurate and efficient use of their cannon, preferring to maintain the order and cleanliness of his ship than exercise his gun teams.

After the Battle of Grand Port, which was a disaster for the British, Commodore Josias Rowley sent urgent messages to Madras and Cape Town requesting reinforcements. The first to arrive were Africaine and HMS Ceylon, both of which were sailing alone.

Africaine was still on her way from England to Madras when on 9 September she stopped at the island of Rodrigues to replenish her water. There she heard of the debacle. By 11 September she had arrived off the Isle de France (now Mauritius) where she sent her boats in shore to find a passage through the reef with a view to capturing a French schooner. The boats' crews succeeded in boarding the vessel, which turned out to be French dispatch vessel No. 23, but had to abandon it in the face of fire from soldiers on shore that killed two men and wounded 16. Africaine then sailed for the Île de Bourbon, which Corbett had learned was in British hands and where Rowley was located to drop off the casualties. Africaine arrived on 12 September and then sailed that evening in pursuit of some French vessels that had been sighted.

Next day Iphigenia and Astrée captured Africaine in the action of 13 September 1810. She had been sailing with HMS Boadicea, HMS Otter, and HMS Staunch trailing some distance behind. When she chased the French frigates and the brig Entreprenante early on the morning of 13 September, she outdistanced her companions, with unfortunate results. Early in the battle a shot took off Corbet's foot and his crew took him below decks. Africaine fought on under her remaining officers with First Lieutenant Joseph Crew Tullidge having taken command. After about two hours, with Tullidge having suffered four wounds, she struck. (Note: For more on Joseph Crew Tullidge see: O'Byrne, William R. (1849). "Tullidge, Joseph Crew" . A Naval Biographical Dictionary. London: John Murray.)

Africaine had 295 men and boys aboard, including 25 soldiers from the 86th Regiment. In all, Africaine lost 49 men killed and 114 wounded. The French took Tullidge and about 90 survivors prisoner and conveyed them to Mauritius where they remained until the British took the island in December. The French lost nine killed and 33 wounded in Iphigénie and one killed and two wounded in Astrée.

The next day Boadicea and her two companions recaptured Africaine. Because she was dismasted and damaged the French did not try to tow her. Also, Astrée had to take Iphigénie into tow. Africaine still had 70 of her wounded and some 83 uninjured of her crew aboard, as well as a ten-man French prize crew.

By the time the British had recaptured Africaine Corbet was dead; he had died some six hours after his foot was amputated. Later, rumours circulated that he had committed suicide because of the dishonour of defeat, or that members of the crew had killed him. From the amount of shot that was still on the vessel there was also reason to suspect that the crew had stopped shooting the cannons after the first few broadsides, perhaps in protest against Corbet. Regardless, a court martial on 23 April 1811 honorably acquitted the surviving officers and crew of the Africaine for the loss of their ship. In August Tullidge received a promotion to Commander.

The French also captured Ceylon, but Boadicea quickly retook her too. Rowley was able to seize Jacques Hamelin and his flagship Vénus at the action of 18 September 1810.

To get Africiane ready for sea again, Bertie appointed Lieutenant Edward Lloyd of Boadicea to supervise the repairs. To give Africiane new masts, Lloyd took a recaptured East Indiaman and salvaged her lower masts, yards and sails. On 14 December she sailed again with an ad hoc crew made up of 30 sailors, a company from the 87th. Regiment instead of marines, and some 120 blacks recruited from plantations on the island. During the subsequent Invasion of Isle de France, Africaine, under Captain Charles Gordon, late of Ceylon, was Vice Admiral Bertie's flagship. (Note: The Admiral's share of the prize money was £2650 5s 2d. A first-class share was worth £278 19s 5¾d; a sixth-class share, that of an ordinary seaman, was worth £3 7s 6¼d. A fourth and final payment was made in July 1828. A first-class share was worth £29 19s 5¼d; a sixth-class share was worth 8s 2½d. This time, Bertie received £314 14s 3½d.)

She arrived in Portsmouth on 21 March with Vice Admiral Bertie.

== East Indies again, and return to England ==
In July 1811 Capt. Brian Hodgson took command, only to be replaced the next month by Captain Edward Rodney, whose appointment was dated September 1810. On 26 November 1811 Rodney and Africaine sailed for the East Indies again.

On 28 August 1813, Rodney sent in boats to take the Annapoorny, a merchant vessel belonging to Prince of Wales Island that the King of Acheen had seized and which claimed to be British. Some correspondence between Rodney and the King had preceded the seizure, and afterwards the King entertained the lieutenant in charge of the cutting out party and Richard Blakeny. The King was a relatively young man and had a few years earlier served for three years as a midshipman on HMS Caroline.

In May 1815, Africaine and the brig Victor were escorting six East Indiamen from Ceylon to England. One of the vessels was the ill-fated Arniston, which got separated from the convoy and was wrecked on the coast of South Africa with the loss of 372 lives. When Africaine returned to Portsmouth on 6 December 1815, only 42 of her original crew of 350 were still on board.

Earlier in 1815, James Cooper and three of his shipmates were publicly court martialed, then hanged on 1 February 1816 following their being found guilty of sodomy on board the ship. Two other members of her crew received a flogging for deviant sexual behavior.

== Fate ==
Africaine was broken up at Deptford in September 1816.
