= HMS Majestic (1785) =

Ship of the line of the Royal Navy

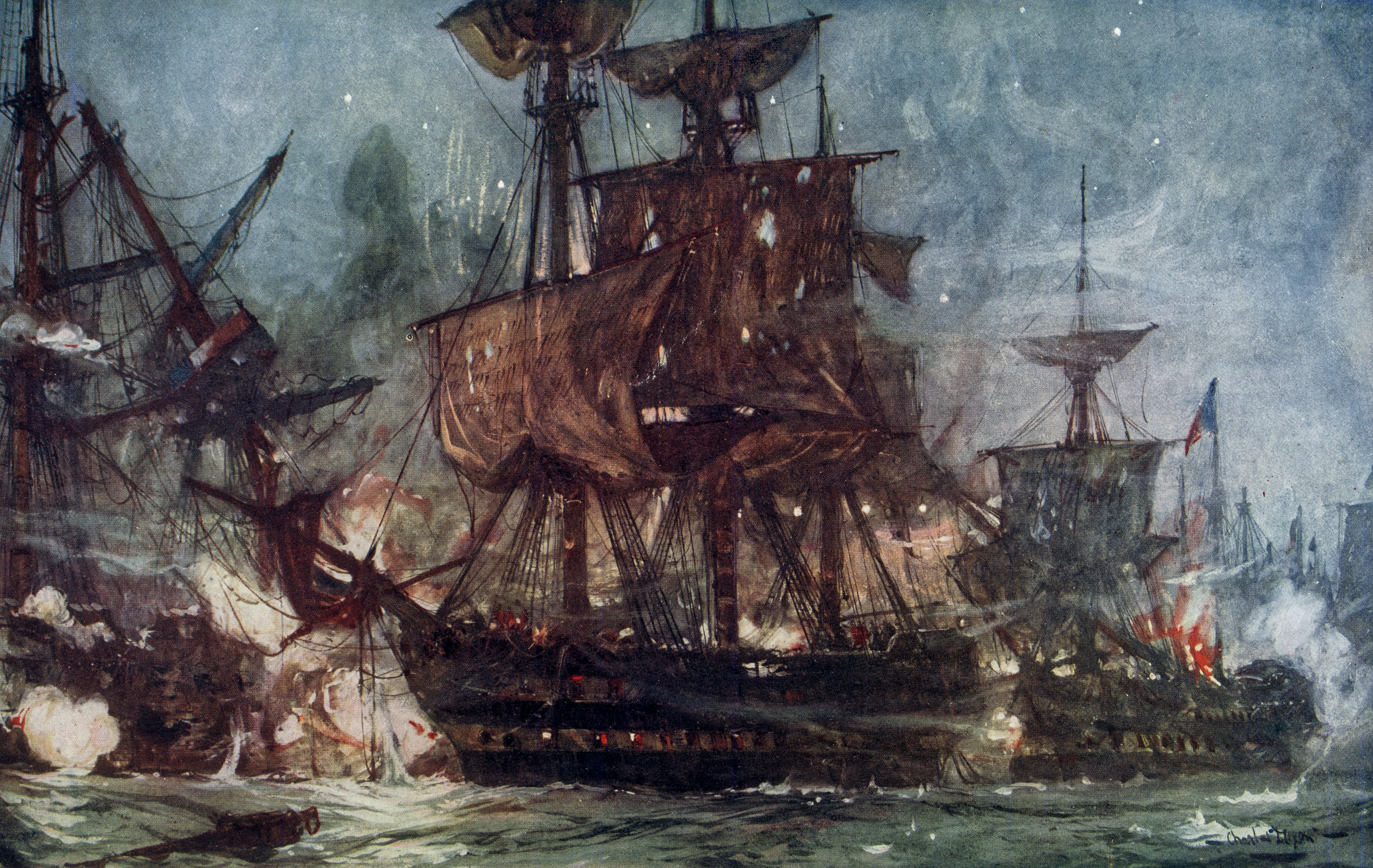
- Majestic (centre) at the Battle of the Nile

History

Great Britain
- Name: HMS Majestic
- Ordered: 23 August 1781
- Builder: Adams & Barnard, Deptford
- Laid down: June 1782
- Launched: 11 December 1785
- Honours and awards: Participated in: Battle of the Nile
- Fate: Broken up, April 1816

General characteristics
- Class & type: Canada-class ship of the line
- Tons burthen: 1623 (bm)
- Length: 170 ft (52 m) (gundeck)
- Beam: 46 ft 9 in (14.25 m)
- Depth of hold: 20 ft 6 in (6.25 m)
- Propulsion: Sails
- Sail plan: Full-rigged ship
- Armament: As third rate: Gundeck (GD): 28 × 32-pounder guns; Upper gundeck (UG): 28 × 18-pounder guns; QD: 14 × 9-pounder guns; Fc: 4 × 9-pounder guns; As fourth rate: Upper gundeck: 28 × 42-pounder carronades; Gundeck: 28 × 32-pounder guns; Quarterdeck: 2 × 12-pounder guns

HMS Majestic was a 74-gun third-rate ship of the line of the Royal Navy launched on 11 December 1785 at Deptford Dockyard.

== Career ==
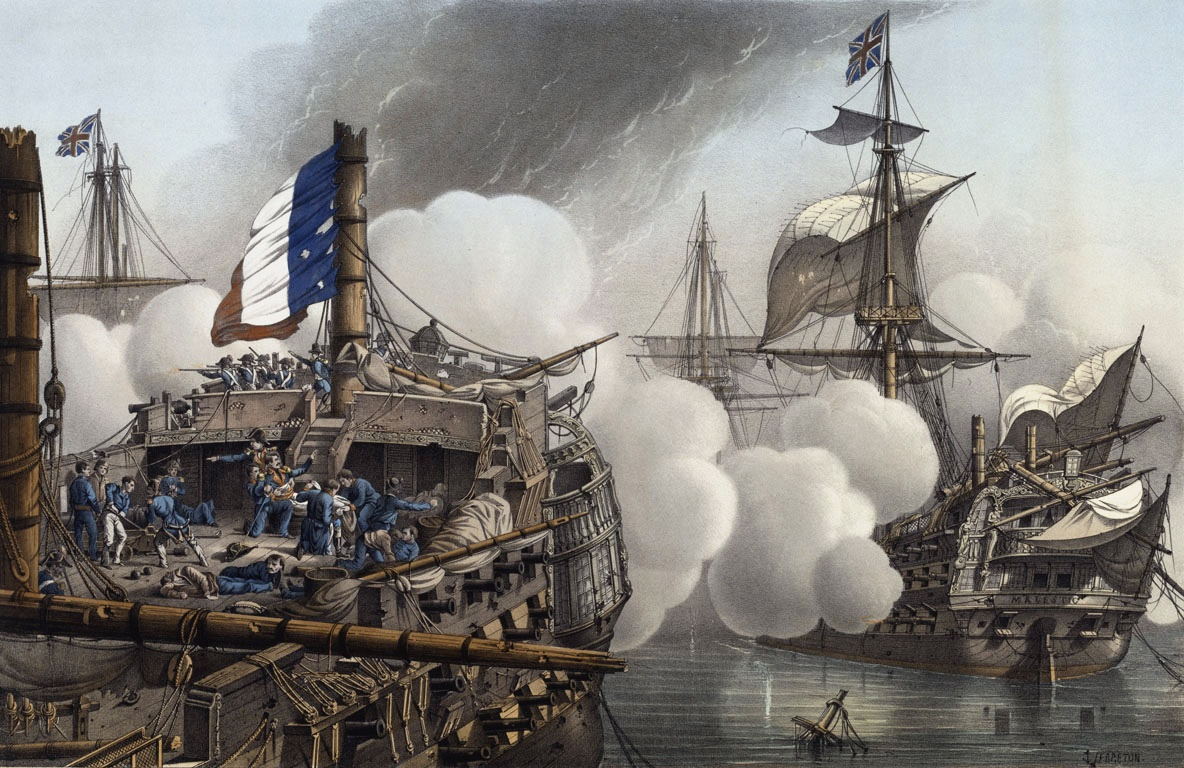
Majestic engaging Tonnant at the Battle of the Nile, by Louis Le Breton

Majestic fought at the 1798 Battle of the Nile, where she engaged the French ships Tonnant and Heureux, helping to force their surrenders. She was captained by George Blagdon Westcott, who was killed in the battle.

On 22 February 1799, Majestic was in sight when Espoir, under the command of Captain James Sanders, captured the Spanish 14-gun xebec Africa some three leagues (14 km) from Marbello on the Spanish coast. Captain Cuthbert, of Majestic, transmitted Sanders's letter, adding his own endorsement extolling "the meritorious Conduct of Captain Sanders and his Ship's Company on the Occasion." Espoir and Majestic shared the prize money for the xebec, whose full name was Nostra Senora de Africa. On 4 April, Majestic and Transfer destroyed a French privateer of unknown name. Head money was paid in 1828, almost 30 years later. (Note: A first-class share of the head money was worth £94 2s 9¾d; a fifth-class share, that of a seaman, was worth 4s 11¾d.)

On 11 November 1804, Glatton, together with Eagle, Majestic, Princess of Orange, Raisonable, Africiane, Inspector, Beaver, and the hired armed vessels Swift and Agnes, shared in the capture of Upstalsboom, H.L. De Haase, Master. (Note: The prize money for an ordinary seaman was 10d.) On 4 September 1807, Majestic, flagship of Admiral Thomas Macnamara Russell anchored off Heligoland, effecting the capitulation of the island to the British. Majestic was razeed into a 58-gun fourth-rate frigate in 1813.

On 34 February 1814 Majestic encountered the French frigates Terpsichore and Atalante, in company with the 20 gun American privateer, Swallow, and an apparently unarmed brig. Majestic was able to catch up with and engage the stern-most of the French vessels. After an engagement lasting two and a half hours, the frigate struck. She turned out to be the Terpsichore, of 44 guns and 320 men, under the command of "capitaine de frigate Breton Francois de Sire". In the action, Terpsichore lost three men killed, six wounded, and two drowned as the prisoners were being transported to Majestic; British casualties were nil. Because of the weather and the approach of night, Majestic was unable to pursue the other three French vessels, which therefore escaped. The Royal Navy named Terpsichore HMS Modeste, but never commissioned her.

On 22 May 1814 Majestic recaptured the former British naval schooner Dominica, which the American privateer Decatur had captured the year before. At the time of her recapture, Dominica was sailing under a letter of marque, had a crew of 38 men, and was armed with four 6-pounder guns. Majestic was broken up in 1816 after a stranding.
