= Hired armed lugger Venus =

British naval lugger 1804–1806

His Majesty's hired armed lugger Venus, which was renamed Agnes in 1804, served the British Royal Navy from 8 March 1804 until she foundered in the Texel in March 1806.

She was of 6687/94 tons (bm), and her armament consisted of six 12-pounder carronades. She had a crew of 23 men. She served on a contract from 26 April March 1804 to 25 October 1806, during which time the Admiralty paid £2017 12s per year for her hire.

On 11 November 1804 Glatton, together with Eagle, Majestic, Princess of Orange, Raisonable, Africaine, Inspector, Beaver, and the hired armed cutters Swift and Agnes shared in the capture of Upstalsboom, H.L. De Haase, master. (Note: The prize money for an ordinary seaman was 10d.)

Around early March 1806 Agnes sent into Yarmouth Amelia Sophia, Kahler, master, which had been sailing from Amsterdam to Bordeaux.

Agnes was under the command of Lieutenant William Morgan when she foundered off the Texel. The date of her loss may be 4 March 1806, or 28 March 1806. The fate of her 30-man crew is unknown.
