= Petite Sans Culotte =

French Navy tartane

History

France
- Name: Petite Sans Culotte
- Acquired: July 1793
- Captured: August 1793

Great Britain
- Name: Petite Victoire
- Acquired: by capture August 1793
- Fate: Lost 16 March 1794

General characteristics
- Armament: 2 × 6-pounder guns

Petite Sans Culotte was a French Navy tartane that the French Navy acquired at Toulon in July 1793, and armed with two 6-pounder guns. The British captured her in August at the Siege of Toulon. She was commissioned on 5 September into the British Royal Navy under the command of Lieutenant James Morgan, of HMS Victory. Morgan had been a midshipman on Victory and on his promotion to 8th Lieutenant of Victory, was immediately transferred to Petite Sans Culotte. He brought with him as crew 10 men from Victory. Consequently, the British renamed her Petite Victoire.

Petite Victoire served against the batteries surrounding the city and performed useful services during the evacuation of Toulon on 18 December. She apparently was not abandoned to be captured.

== Fate ==
She was lost off Cap Corse. In a journal entry and two letters dated 16 March 1794, Lord Nelson mentions that Petite Victoire "having started a plank was obliged to run on shore, and is hauled up", and "Petite Victoire – hauled on shore at Erbalonga". Erbalunga is a fishing village on Cape Corse, the site of Tour d'Erbalunga, and some five miles north of Bastia. Nelson also reports that his carpenter had looked at Petite Victoire; the carpenter reported that she was so damaged as not to be worth repairing. Nelson remarks that the officer commanding her was not at fault as the gale that resulted in his grounding her was strong. At the time Nelson, in Agamemnon, was off Erbalunga, planning an attack on Bastia.

== Confusion as to origins and naming ==
Petite Sans Cullote was amongst the most minor of vessels, acquired and lost during a turbulent period; it is no surprise that her history is obscure. One source suggests that Petite Victoire was the former Brave Sans Cullote. However, Demerliac lists Petite Victoire as a separate ship, a 2-gun brig in service in Toulon in July 1793, origin and measurements unknown, that the British captured and that was lost off Cape Corse).
