= HMS Procris (1806) =

Brig-sloop of the Royal Navy

- Procris

History

United Kingdom
- Name: HMS Procris
- Ordered: 22 January 1806
- Builder: Custance & Stone, Great Yarmouth
- Laid down: May 1806
- Launched: 27 December 1806
- Honours and awards: Naval General Service Medal with clasp "Java"
- Fate: Sold 1815

United Kingdom
- Name: Procris
- Owner: J.Brown
- Acquired: 1815 by purchase
- Fate: Wrecked 25 August 1839

General characteristics
- Class & type: 18-gun Cruizer-class brig-sloop
- Tons burthen: Old Act:38426/94, or 392 (bm); New Act (post 1836):372 (bm)
- Length: 100 ft 0 in (30.5 m) (overall); 77 ft 2 7/8 in (23.5 m)
- Beam: 30 ft 7 in (9.3 m)
- Depth of hold: 12 ft 10 in (3.9 m)
- Propulsion: Sails
- Armament: 16 × 32-pounder carronades + 2 × 6-pounder guns

HMS Procris was a Cruizer-class brig-sloop launched in 1807. She served at the second battle of Copenhagen. She then went out to the East Indies where she spent the rest of her active service, including participating in the 1811 invasion of Java. She returned to Britain in 1814 and was sold the next year. She then became a merchantman, while retaining her name. She traded primarily with North America but on a voyage in the Mediterranean an armed Greek brig captured her. However, her master was able to regain control. She was wrecked on 25 August 1839.

== Career ==
Commander Francis Beauman commissioned Procris in March 1807 for service in the North Sea. She is listed among the vessels qualifying for prize money arising out of the battle of Copenhagen. (Note: An able seaman's share of the prize money was worth £3 8s.) On the way, Procris and Cherub detained the Danish ship Neptunus on 30 August.

Commander James M. Gordon replaced Beauman in October. He then sailed Procris for the East Indies on 18 December 1807. In February 1808 Commander Robert Maunsell replaced Beauman.

In the run-up to the British invasion of Java, on 14 July 1809 Procris encountered and destroyed the Dutch privateer Wagster. Wagster, a brig belonging to the Dutch East India Company, was armed with eight guns and four swivel guns, and had a crew of 86 men. The encounter took place off Batavia.

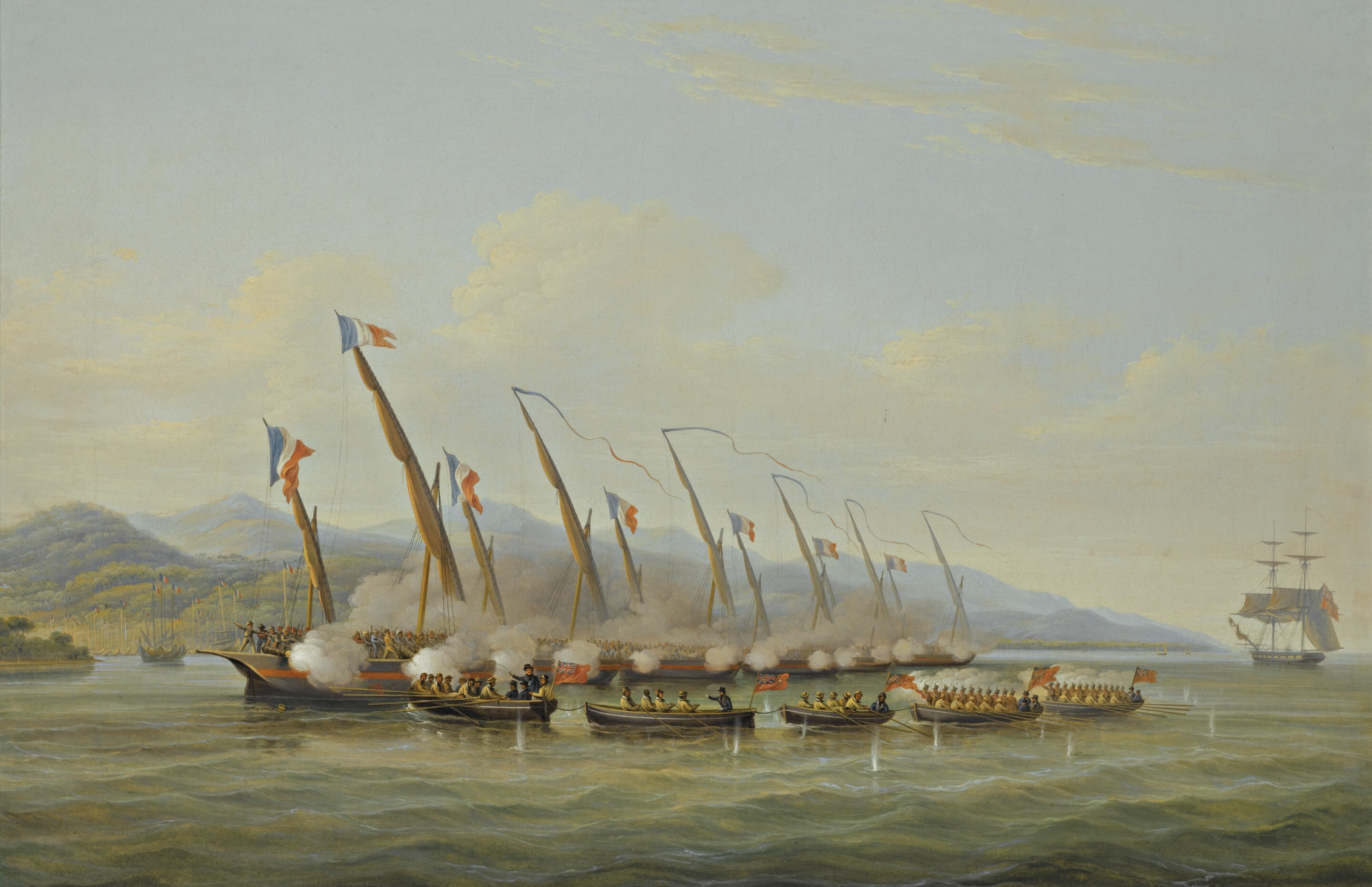
Captain Robert Maunsell sent his boats from Procris (seen here on the far right) to capture French gunboats off the mouth of the Indramayo, Java, July 1811

Then on 30 July Procris anchored at the mouth of Indramayo, following the orders of Captain George Sayer of the frigate Leda. At daylight Maunsell discovered six Dutch gun-boats in the river, each armed with a brass 32-pounder carronade forward, and a long 18-pounder aft, and carrying a crew of 60 men. They were protecting a convoy of 40 to 50 proas. As Procris moved towards them she quickly ran into shallower water and had to anchor at a range that left her cannon fire ineffective. Maunsell persisted in his attack using Procris's boats, as well as two flat boats that had accompanied him, each carrying an officer and 20 men from the 14th and 89th Regiments of Foot. During the British attack one of the Dutch gunboats blew up. The British captured the other five seriatim, all with a loss of only 11 men wounded, albeit some dangerously or badly, despite the heavy fire from the gunboats' cannons and small arms. During the attack the proas escaped up the river.

The British finally were able to land troops on Java on 4 August, with Batavia falling to them on 26 August after a siege and heavy fighting. Total British casualties, army and navy combined, were 156 killed, 788 wounded, and 16 missing. Maunsell served on shore, assisting Sayer, who commanded the 500 seamen that manned the twenty 18-pounder guns landed from their ships and emplaced in batteries to bombard Fort Cornelius. In the exchange of fire several seamen became casualties. Procris alone lost one man killed and seven wounded. In 1847 the Admiralty awarded the Naval General Service Medal with clasp "Java" to all surviving claimants from the campaign.

Lieutenant Walter Forman became acting commander of Procris in late 1811. She was under his command in March 1812 when a British squadron, consisting of Bucephalus, Cornelia, and Procris, the Honourable East India Company's (HEIC) warships Mercury and Teignnmouth, and its gunboats Wellington and Young Barracouta, as well as the transports Sandany, Minerva, Matilda, and Mary Ann, sailed from Batavia on a punitive expedition to Palembang, on Sumatra, after the Sultan there massacred Dutch and Malays at the Dutch factory there earlier in the month. The British brought with them detachments from the 59th and 89th Regiments of Foot, the Madras horse artillery and hussars (dismounted), Bengal artillery, two battalions of sepoys, and an Ambonese contingent.

Phoenix, under the command of Captain James Bowen, joined up with the fleet later, with Bowen taking command of the fleet as senior naval office. When Bowen discovered that frigates could not cross the bar before the river on which Palembang sits, Bowen transferred his command to Procris. Between 18 and 26 April, she, together with Teignmouth, Wellington and Barracouta and the larger warships' boats, proceeded 60 miles upriver. On the way, they captured undefended shore batteries containing 101 guns, and captured the Sultan's palace, which surrendered without a fight though 104 guns protected it. (Note: A first-class share of the first payment of the prize money, including the ordnance captured, was worth £208 13s 1½d; a sixth-class share, that of an ordinary seaman, was worth £2 9s 2¼d. A first-class share of the final payment was worth £152 12s 3d; a sixth-class share was worth £1 16s.) Foreman served about five months aboard Procris before transferring to Malacca to assume the post of first lieutenant.

In February 1812 Lieutenant Nathaniel Norton was appointed to command of Procris, replacing Forman. As Forman was still commanding her in the expedition to Palembang, Norton must have taken actual command in late April or after.

Procris joined Phoenix, Barracouta, and a detachment of 100 men from the 48th Highlanders in a punitive expedition against the Sultanate of Sambas, along the Sambas River in western Borneo. Barracouta was unable to force the river defenses and the expedition was forced to retreat after she suffered some casualties. Bowen died shortly thereafter of fever. The HEIC cruiser Aurora and some gunboats then maintained a blockade until a second punitive expedition arrived in June 1813.

The Royal Navy contingent in the second punitive expedition consisted of Leda, Hussar, Malacca, Volage, Hecate, and Procris, with Captain Sayer of Leda as the senior naval officer. The HEIC contributed the cruisers Malabar, Teignmouth, and Aurora, seven gunboats, the transport Troubridge, and the East Indiaman Princess Charlotte of Wales . The army contingent consisted of the 14th Regiment of Foot, a company each from the Bengal artillery and the HEIC's European Regiment, and the 3rd Bengal Volunteer Battalion. Eventually the British vessels, except the frigates, were able to cross bar in front of the river and move towards the town of Sambas. Capturing two forts yielded over 70 brass and iron guns of mixed calibers, but the town of itself yielded little booty. The expedition was able to recapture the Portuguese brig Coromandel, which the pirates had captured the year before. British casualties from combat were relatively low, but casualties from fever and disease were high.

In April 1813 Commander Thomas Cusson replaced Norton. Cusson sailed Procris back to Britain, arriving in August 1814.

Disposal: The Navy put Procris up for sale in February 1815. She finally sold, for £900, on 23 November.

== Merchantman ==
Procris then became a merchantman. She first appeared in Lloyd's Register in 1816 with John Facey, master, J.Brown, owner, and trade Poole-"Merm".

Year	Master	Owner	Trade	Source
1820	J.Taggart	J.Brown	Liverpool–New Brunswick	LR
1825	J.Taggart	J.Brown	Cork	LR

On 1 January 1822, Procris, Taggart, master, ran aground as she was arriving at Poole from Cork. she was gotten off and arrived the next day.

In 1827 Procris, Arnold, master, was sailing in the Mediterranean. A letter from Smyrna dated 12 September 1827, reported that as she was sailing from Alexandria to Leghorn she encountered an armed Greek brig which put six men aboard her and ordered her to sail to Napoli. However, shortly thereafter the brig and Procris encountered a fleet of 80 vessels from Egypt, bound for Morea. The brig made off while Arnold sailed Procris into the fleet, over-powered the Greeks on board, and then sailed to Smyrna.

On 22 June Procris, Arnold, master, bought into Campbeltown. She had been on her way from Quebec to Liverpool when she struck rocks at Kiell, near the Mull of Kintyre. Her rudder irons were broken and it was possible that she had sustained severe damage.

Year	Master	Owner	Trade	Source & notes
1830	R.Arnolds	J.Brown	London–Quebec	LR
1835	J.Arnold	J.Brown	Poole-America	LR
1839	J.Frost	J.Brown	Poole–Quebec	LR; homeport of Poole, small repairs 1839

== Fate ==
Procris was wrecked 25 August 1839 on Allan's Island, Newfoundland and Labrador. Her crew were rescued. Lloyd's Register (LR) for 1839 carried the annotation "Wrecked" by her name.
