= HCS Aurora (1809) =

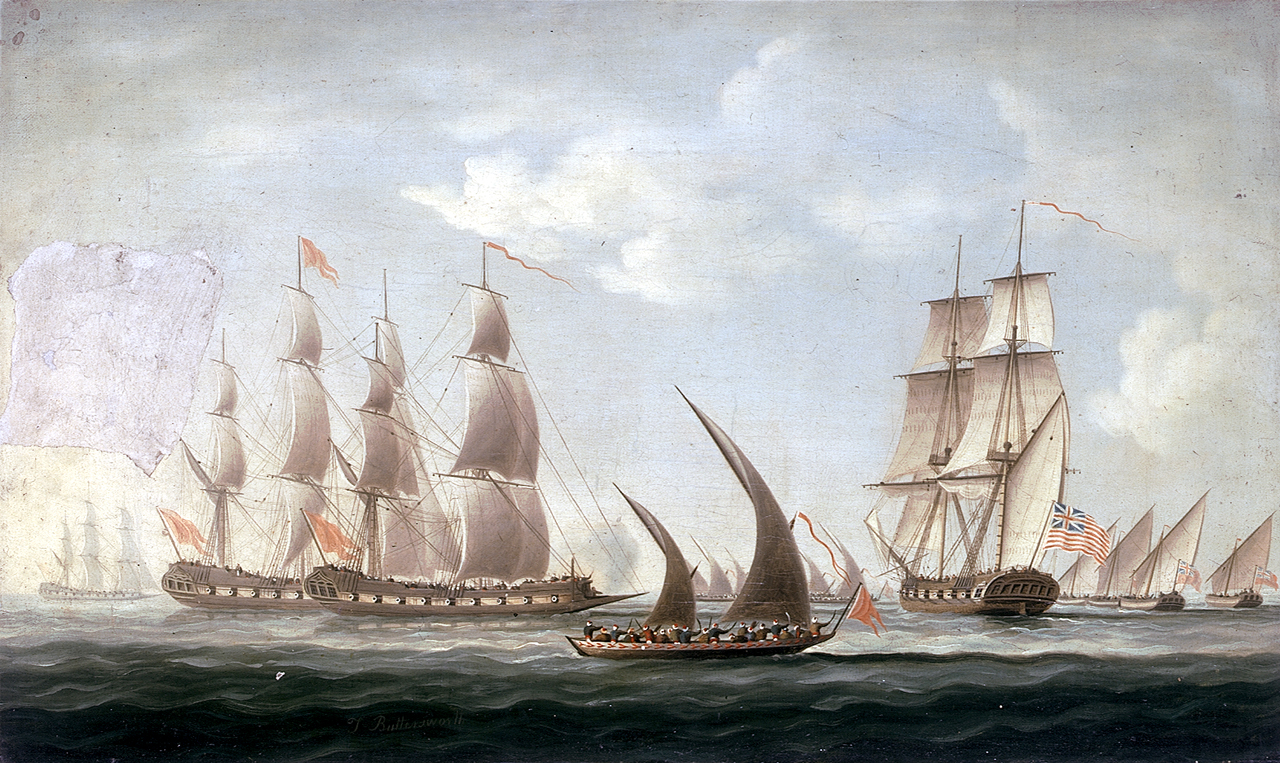
- Aurora (right) in 1816

History

British East India Company
- Name: Aurora
- Owner: British East India Company
- Operator: Bombay Marine
- Builder: Bombay Dockyard
- Launched: 1809
- Fate: Last listed 1828

General characteristics
- Type: Sloop
- Tons burthen: 217 or 247 (bm)
- Sail plan: sloop
- Armament: 14 guns

HCS Aurora was a 14-gun sloop-of-war of the Bombay Marine launched in 1809 at the Bombay Dockyard. Intended to protect East India Company (EIC) trade routes in the Indian Ocean from piracy, the French Imperial Navy captured Aurora in the action of 13 September 1810, only to have the British recapture her in early December of that year. Aurora returned to the service of the Bombay Marine, assisting the British military in various campaigns in the East Indies and Persian Gulf. The last mention of Aurora in EIC records was 1828, when she was listed on the rolls of the Bombay Marine on 1 January of that year.

== Career ==
Aurora went into active service shortly after she was launched. Under the command of Lieutenant Conyers, she participated the Persian Gulf campaign of 1809. The Royal Navy and the EIC sent a large force to the Persian Gulf to force the Qawasim - a tribal confederation at war with Britain's ally, Oman - to cease their attacks on local shipping, particularly on the Persian and Arab coasts of the Straits of Hormuz. The operation's success was limited as British were unable to permanently suppress the strong fleets of the Qawasim of Ras Al Khaimah and Sharjah, choosing not to press their landing at Ras Al Khaimah for fear of reinforcements arriving from the interior. As Commodore Wainwright, who led the expedition, commented: "We had to deal with an enemy on whom we had not set sufficient value." Aurora would return to Ras Al Khaimah in 1819.

=== Capture and recapture ===
Aurora, under the command of Lieutenant Watkins, left Bombay on 16 August 1810 on a cruise. Lloyd's List reported that the French frigates Iphigenia and Astree had captured Aurora, of 10 guns and 100 men, in October. French records reveal that Iphigénie, under Acting Captain Bouvet, and Astrée captured Aurora, of 16-guns, in the action of 13 September 1810. Both reports agree that her captors took her to Île de France. The French Navy then took Aurora into service as the corvette Aurore.

The British recaptured Aurora, and several other EIC vessels, as a consequence of their successful invasion of Isle de France in November–December 1810. Aurora then returned to Bombay and the EIC's service.

When the French captured British vessels they tried to get sailors, marines, and in the case of EIC ships, lascars, to join the French Navy. Apparently they generally had some success, particularly with Irishmen and lascars. However, in the case of Aurora, her marine detachment of 16 or 17 sepoys, recruited from among the Concanny Purwarries and serving in the Marine Battalion of the Bombay Marine, were steadfast in resisting first blandishments and then harsh treatment. (Note: Purwarry was a term for low-caste Indians, possibly pariahs or Paraiyars.) When Aurora returned to Bombay, the Government promoted each man one grade, gave all the men a medal inscribed on one side in English and the other in Konkani, and had the order commending the marines read to every Native regiment in the Bombay army.

=== Invasion of Java and punitive expeditions ===
In 1811, the Royal Navy and the EIC combined to launch an invasion of Java. The EIC contributed several warships, including Aurora, under the command of Commander Watkins, and several East Indiamen and other transports.

In December Aurora was in Calcutta when the news arrived that a large force of Burmese troops had invaded the area of Chittagong. Captain Macdonald of Aurora assembled a force consisting of Aurora and the EIC's cruisers Phoenix, Thetis, and Vestal, as well as a 900 troops. The troops disembarked at Chittagong on 6 December, at which point the Burmese retreated.

In 1812, Palimbang was under British control, with Sir Stamford Raffles as the governor of British Java. The ex-sultan of Palimbang established a stockade a few miles up from the city. From there he intercepted supplies and threatened the new sultan. Major Mears of the Bombay Army and Captain MacDonald of Aurora sent 200 men in boats to capture the stockade. They were able to do so, though not without the loss of Major Mears.

That same year, HMS Phoenix, HMS Procris, and HMS Barracouta, and a detachment of 100 men from the 48th Highlanders set out on a punitive expedition against the Sultanate of Sambas, along the Sambas River in western Borneo. Barracouta was unable to force the river defenses and the expedition retreated after she suffered some casualties.

From January Aurora and some gunboats then maintained a blockade until a second punitive expedition arrived in June 1813. While she maintained the blockade, Aurora recaptured some valuable Chinese junks, and unsuccessfully chased the ship Coromandel, up the river.

For the second punitive expedition against Sambas, the Royal Navy contingent consisted of Leda, Hussar, Malacca, Volage, Hecate, and Procris, with Captain Sayer of Leda as the senior naval officer. The EIC contributed the cruisers Malabar, Teignmouth, and Aurora, seven gunboats, the transport Troubridge, and the East Indiaman Princess Charlotte of Wales. The army contingent consisted of the 14th Regiment of Foot, a company each from the Bengal artillery and the HEIC's European Regiment, and the 3rd Bengal Volunteer Battalion. Eventually the British vessels, except the frigates, were able to cross the bar in front of the river and move towards the town of Sambas. Capturing two forts yielded over 70 brass and iron guns of mixed calibers, but the town of itself yielded little booty. The expedition was able to recapture the Portuguese brig Coromandel, which the pirates had captured the year before. British casualties from combat were relatively low, but casualties from fever and disease were high.

In early 1814, the British Army officer in charge at Palimbang replaced the current sultan with the previous sultan, who was sent into retirement in the interior. Raffles sent Captain MacDonald and Aurora, to investigate the situation. The previous sultan was deposed and his successor reinstated.

In April, the EIC put together a small force consisting of Malabar, under Captain Robert Deane, the overall naval commander, Teignmouth, Aurora, and some gunboats, and an Army contingent under the command of Major-General Miles Nightingale to capture the town of Makassar from its current rajah. On 7 June the force captured Makassar, with the rajah fleeing into the countryside. A new rajah was installed, and the force returned to Company waters. Aurora returned to Calcutta, carrying the Army staff and several officials.

=== Incident in 1816 ===
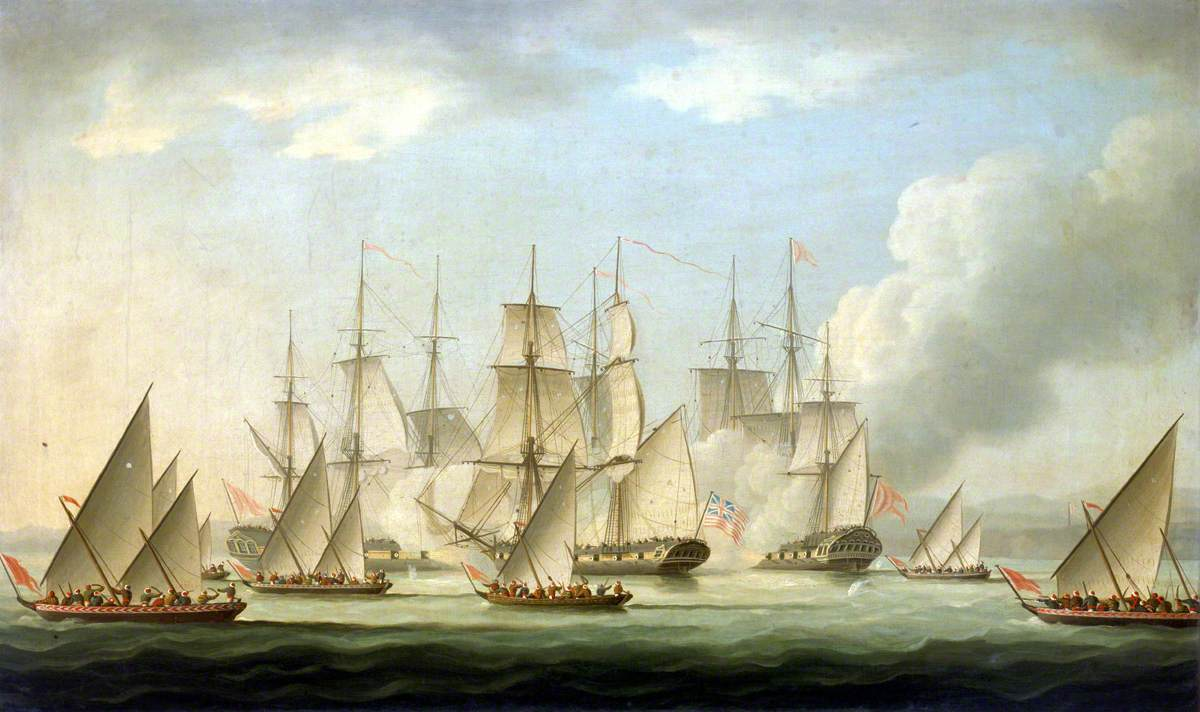
Aurora being attacked by grabs and gallivats of the Maratha Navy. (Note: The title of the picture gives the date as 1812, but the year 1816 is more probable. In 1812 Aurora was in the East Indies, and other versions of related pictures give the year as 1816, though attributing the action to an engagement against Joasmi pirates. However, the vessels are grabs and gallivats, not dhows, suggesting that a combination of 1816 and Mahratta navy is more plausible.)

The Maratha Navy, the organised naval force of the Maratha Empire posed a longstanding problem for the EIC. In 1816 Aurora engaged in combat with a Maratha navy flotilla in the Bay of Bengal. The painting to the right shows Aurora engaging two grabs and numerous gallivats. (Note: A grab (from the Marathi gurab), was a two or three-masted ship generally found on the Malabar Coast. A gallivat was a small vessel resembling a Mediterranean felucca, and like a felucca carried a triangular sail.) The action immediately preceded the Third Anglo-Maratha War (1817–18), which finally brought the Maratha Empire under EIC control.

=== Incident in 1817 ===
In January 1817 Aurora was under the command of Captain Jeakes. She was towing a large "baghalah", which carried treasure from Kuwait and was destined for the Imam of Muscat. As they were sailing down the Gulf, a Qawasim force of 15 "dhows and trankies" attacked them, attempting to capture the baghalah. Jeakes managed to maneuver Aurora to bring her guns to bear and sink many of the dhows. When Aurora and the baghalah arrived at Muscat, the Imam presented Captain Jeakes with a valuable sword and an Arabian horse. Aurora then continued her journey onto Bombay.

=== Punitive expedition against Ras Al Khaimah ===
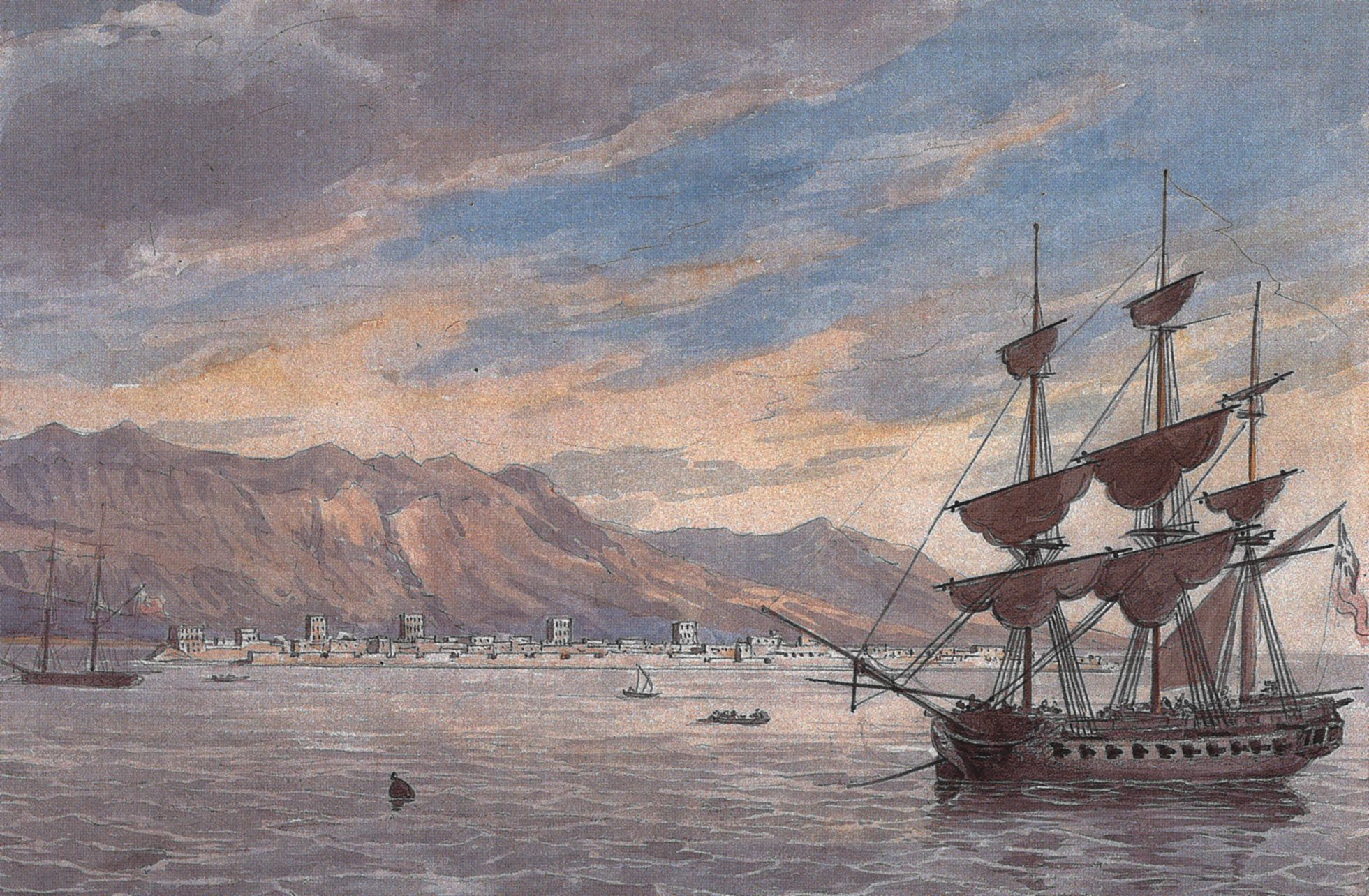
The British fleet off Ras Al Khaimah, 1819.

In November 1819, the British embarked on an expedition against the Qawasim, led by Major-General William Keir Grant, voyaging to Ras Al Khaimah with a platoon of 3,000 soldiers. The British extended an offer to Said bin Sultan of Muscat in which he would be made ruler of the 'Pirate Coast' if he agreed to assist the British in their expedition. Obligingly, he sent a force of 600 men and two ships. The naval force consisted of Liverpool, Eden, Curlew, and a number of gun and mortar boats. Captain Collier, of Liverpool, led the naval force. The Bombay Marine of the East India Company (EIC) contributed six armed vessels: the 16-gun Teignmouth under the command of Captain Hall, the EIC senior captain, the 16-gun Benares, the 14-gun Aurora, the 14-gun Nautilus, the 12-gun Ariel, and the 12-gun Vestal. Later two frigates and 600 men belonging to the Sultan of Muscat joined the expedition, and a further 2,000 troops were to join from the landward side, having travelled from Muscat.

On the army side, Major General Sir William Keir commanded some 3,000 troops in transports, including the 47th and 65th Regiments of Foot, the 1st Battalion of the 2nd Regiment of Native Infantry, the flank companies of the 1st Battalion of the 3rd Regiment of Native Infantry and of the Marine Battalion, and half a company of Pioneers. In all, 1,645 European and 1,424 Indian soldiers and marines took part in the expedition. Grant Keir and Collier sailed to Ras Al Khaimah on the Liverpool, with the Benares accompanying them and carried out a reconnaissance on 26 and 27 November. Benares was then sent to Qeshm to summon the main fleet, which arrived on 2 December. The force landed the troops two miles south of Ras Al Khaimah town and set up batteries of guns and mortars and the town was bombarded from both land and sea, the Aurora and Nautilus entering the creek and commencing a heavy fire on the town. Collier placed Captain Walpole of Curlew in charge of the gun boats and an armed pinnace to protect the landing, which was, however, unopposed. The main bombardment of the town commenced on 6 December, from landed batteries of 12 pound guns and mortars as well as from sea. On 7 December, two 24-pound cannon from Liverpool were added to the land batteries, dragged along the beach and commencing fire on 8 December. This heavy bombardment resulted in a request for a truce by that evening, which was ignored. The next morning, the 24-pounders breached the walls of the fort and it was stormed.

The rout of Ras Al Khaimah led to only five British casualties as opposed to the 400 to 1,000 casualties reportedly suffered by the Qawasim.

Following the fall of Ras Al Khaimah, the Aurora, together with Curlew and Nautilus, were sent to blockade Rams to the North and this, too was found to be deserted and its inhabitants retired to the small hill-top fort of Dhayah, pursued through the date plantations by British marines. Following a three-day bombardment, (and, in particular, under withering heavy fire from two of Liverpool's 24-pounders that had been dragged miles through the stony wadis) Dhayah Fort surrendered on 22 December. Most of the occupants of Dhayah were women and children and workers who had fled the British advance on their date groves – many were from the Al Tanaij tribe. Of the 400 people who had taken refuge in the fort, only 177 were men of fighting age.

The British expeditionary force then blew up the town of Ras Al Khaimah and established a garrison there of 800 sepoys and artillery, before visiting Jazirat Al Hamra, which was found to be deserted. They went on to destroy the fortifications and larger vessels of Umm Al Qawain, Ajman, Fasht, Sharjah, Abu Hail, and Dubai. Ten vessels that had taken shelter in Bahrain were also destroyed. The Royal Navy suffered no casualties during the action.

The action was to result in the British signing the General Maritime Treaty of 1820 with the coastal rulers, beginning the 150-year British protectorate of the Trucial States, which would, on their independence on 2 December 1971, become the United Arab Emirates.

== Fate ==
The last readily available online mention of Aurora notes that she was still listed as serving the Bombay Marine on 1 January 1828.
