= HMS Malacca (1809) =

Frigate of the Royal Navy

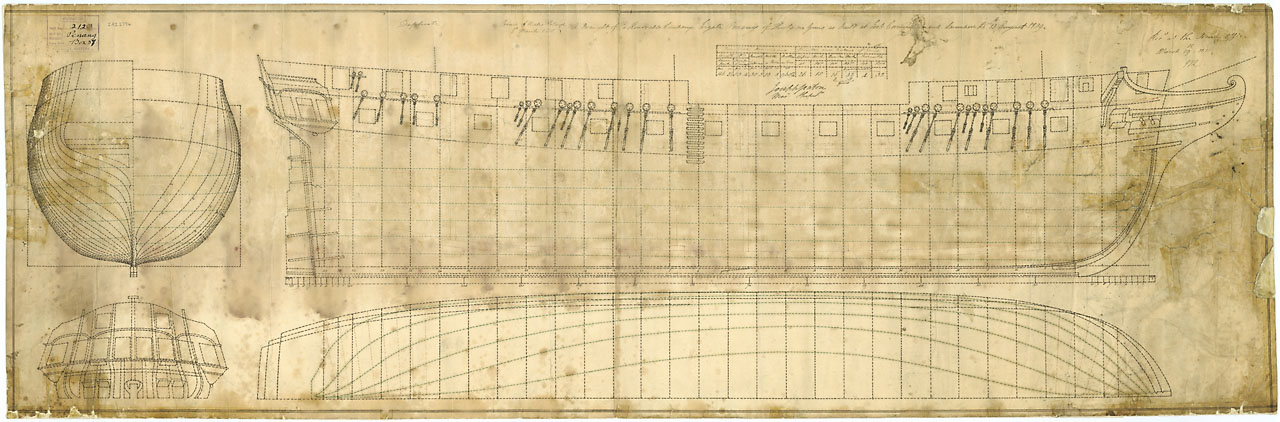
- Penang drawing dated 1809

History

United Kingdom
- Name: Penang
- Ordered: 19 February 1807
- Builder: Prince of Wales Island
- Laid down: February 1808
- Launched: 6 March 1809
- Renamed: Malacca (1808)
- Fate: Broken up 1816

General characteristics
- Class & type: Apollo-class frigate
- Tons burthen: 989 (bm)
- Length: 151 ft 11 in (46.3 m) (gundeck); 124 ft 4 5/8 in (37.9 m) (keel)
- Beam: 38 ft 8 in (11.79 m)
- Depth of hold: 13 ft 2 in (4.01 m)
- Sail plan: Full-rigged ship
- Complement: 264
- Armament: UD: 26 × 18-pounder guns; QD: 2 × 9-pounder guns + 10 × 32-pounder carronades; Fc: 2 × 9-pounder guns + 4 × 32-pounder carronades

HMS Malacca was an Apollo-class frigate of the Royal Navy that the Admiralty ordered from the British East India Company to be built at Prince of Wales Island (Penang), under the name Penang. Prior to her launch in 1809 the Admiralty changed her name to Malacca, but she sailed to England in 1810 as Penang. The Navy commissioned her as Malacca in 1810 and sent her out to the East Indies. She had a brief career there, participating in one small punitive expedition, before she was paid-off in 1815 and broken up in 1816.

== Penang ==
The Royal Navy ordered 36 vessels to the same design, with Malacca the only one being built outside Great Britain. She was built of a variety of timbers and her dimensions deviate noticeably from those of the design and her class-mates. One could argue that she is only nominally a member of the Apollo class.

The dockyard at Prince of Wales's Island built fewer than a handful of vessels before ceasing operations, and apparently Malacca was the first.

The EIC sent Captain Charles Henry Pendares (or Pindarves) Tremenheere out to Penang to take command of Penang and sail her back to England. (He had just lost his ship, the East Indiaman Asia, and was a senior, experienced captain.) Penang/Malacca arrived in England in July 1810.

== HMS Malacca ==
The Royal Navy took Malacca into service on 11 August. She then underwent fitting at Woolwich between 16 August and 28 October 1810. The Navy commissioned Malacca in October under the command of Captain W. Butterfield. He left for the Cape of Good Hope on 31 December 1810, in company with the frigates HMS President and HMS Galatea. After the Cape Malacca remained in the Indian Ocean, while the other two vessels proceeded on to India and Java. Malacca would spend the rest of her military career in the East Indies.

Butterfield cruised off Île de France until he was ordered to the East Indies. There, in August 1812, a court-martial dismissed him from command of Malacca for having exceeded his authority when, at the behest of the merchants, he had HMS Minden escort the October (1811) convoy to England. Captain the Honourable Henry John Peachey received promotion to post captain on 7 August 1812 and replaced Butterfield at that time.

Peachey assumed command of Sir Francis Drake and in May 1812 sailed her back to England as escort to a convoy of returning East Indiamen. At that time, Captain Samuel Leslie (acting) of Volage replaced Peachey. Shortly thereafter Captain Donald Hugh Mackay replaced Leslie.

Malacca participated in the Royal Navy's second punitive expedition in 1813 against the Sultanate of Sambas, along the Sambas River in western Borneo. In addition to Malacca, the force consisted of Leda (a sister ship of Malacca's), Hussar, Volage, Hecate, and Procris, with Captain George Sayer of Leda as the senior naval officer.

The EIC contributed the cruisers Malabar, Teignmouth, and Aurora, seven gunboats, the transport Troubridge, and the East Indiaman Princess Charlotte of Wales. The army contingent consisted of the 14th Regiment of Foot, a company each from the Bengal artillery and the HEIC's European Regiment, and the 3rd Bengal Volunteer Battalion. Eventually the British vessels, except the frigates, were able to cross bar in front of the river and move towards the town of Sambas. Capturing two forts yielded over 70 brass and iron guns of mixed calibers, but the town of itself yielded little booty. The expedition was able to recapture the Portuguese brig Coromandel, which the pirates had captured the year before. British casualties from combat were relatively low, but casualties from fever and disease were high.

Captain George Henderson replaced Mackay on 14 January 1815.

== Fate ==
Malacca was paid-off in June 1815. She was then sold in March 1816.
