= Henry Peachey =

Henry Peachey may refer to:

- Sir Henry Peachey, 1st Baronet (c. 1671–1737), British landowner and politician
- Henry Peachey, 3rd Baron Selsey (1787–1838), Royal Navy officer and peer
