= James Watson (British Army officer) =

Lieutenant-General Sir James Watson KCB
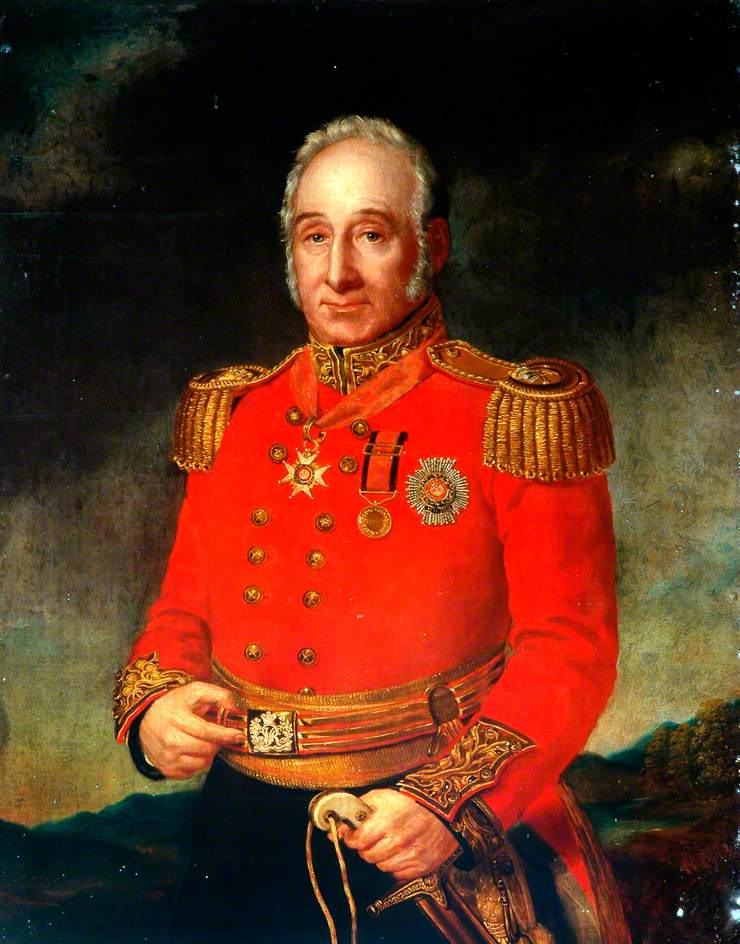
- Born: 1772; Chilton, Buckinghamshire
- Died: 14 August 1862 (aged 90); Wendover, Buckinghamshire, UK
- Military career
- Allegiance: United Kingdom
- Branch: British Army
- Rank: Lieutenant-general
- Commands: Indian Army
- Awards: Knight Commander of the Order of the Bath

Lieutenant-General Sir James Watson (1772 – 14 August 1862) was a British Army officer and Commander-in-Chief, India.

== Military career ==
Watson was commissioned into the 14th Regiment of Foot reaching the rank of major in 1802. He was appointed commanding officer of the 1st Battalion of his regiment in 1807 and served in India and Batavia, Dutch East Indies. During his time in the East Indies, he led the 14th Regiment of Foot in a punitive expedition against the Sultanate of Sambas in West Borneo.

In March 1835 he was appointed Commander-in-Chief, India, and continued in that role until September; two years later he was promoted to lieutenant-general and made colonel of the 14th Regiment of Foot, a position he held until his death.

He was also an active member of the Army and Navy Club. He lived in Wendover in Buckinghamshire.

He died in 1862. He had married Sarah, with whom he had at least a son and a daughter.

Military offices
Preceded by Lord William Bentinck	Commander-in-Chief, India; 1835	Succeeded by Sir Henry Fane
Preceded by Sir Frederick Ponsonby	Colonel of the 86th (Royal County Down) Regiment of Foot; 1836–1837	Succeeded by Arthur Brooke
