= Donald Mackay (Royal Navy officer) =

British Royal Navy officer

Vice-Admiral Donald Mackay
- Born: 31 December 1780
- Died: 26 March 1850 (aged 69)
- Military career
- Allegiance: United Kingdom
- Branch: Royal Navy
- Service years: 1792–1850
- Rank: Vice-Admiral
- Commands: HMS Volage; HMS Malacca; HMS Minden; Queenstown
- Conflicts: French Revolutionary Wars

Vice-Admiral Donald Hugh Mackay (31 December 1780 – 26 March 1850) was a Royal Navy officer who became Commander-in-Chief, Queenstown.

== Naval career ==
Mackay joined to Royal Navy in January 1792. He took part in the expedition to Ostend under Rear Admiral Sir Home Popham to destroy the sluice gates of the Bruges canal in May 1798 during the French Revolutionary Wars. He also took part in the Anglo-Russian invasion of Holland in Autumn 1799. He became commanding officer of the sixth-rate HMS Volage‚ commanding officer of the fifth-rate HMS Malacca and then commanding officer of the third-rate HMS Minden, all between 1811 and 1816, on the East Indies Station. He went on to be Commander-in-Chief, Queenstown in 1848 before he died in 1850.

== Family ==
In 1848 Mackay married Helen Martha Twinnin.

Military offices
Preceded by Thomas Ussher	Commander-in-Chief, Queenstown; 1848–1850	Succeeded by Manley Dixon
