= Invasion of Java (1811) =

British invasion of the island of Java

- Part of the Napoleonic Wars
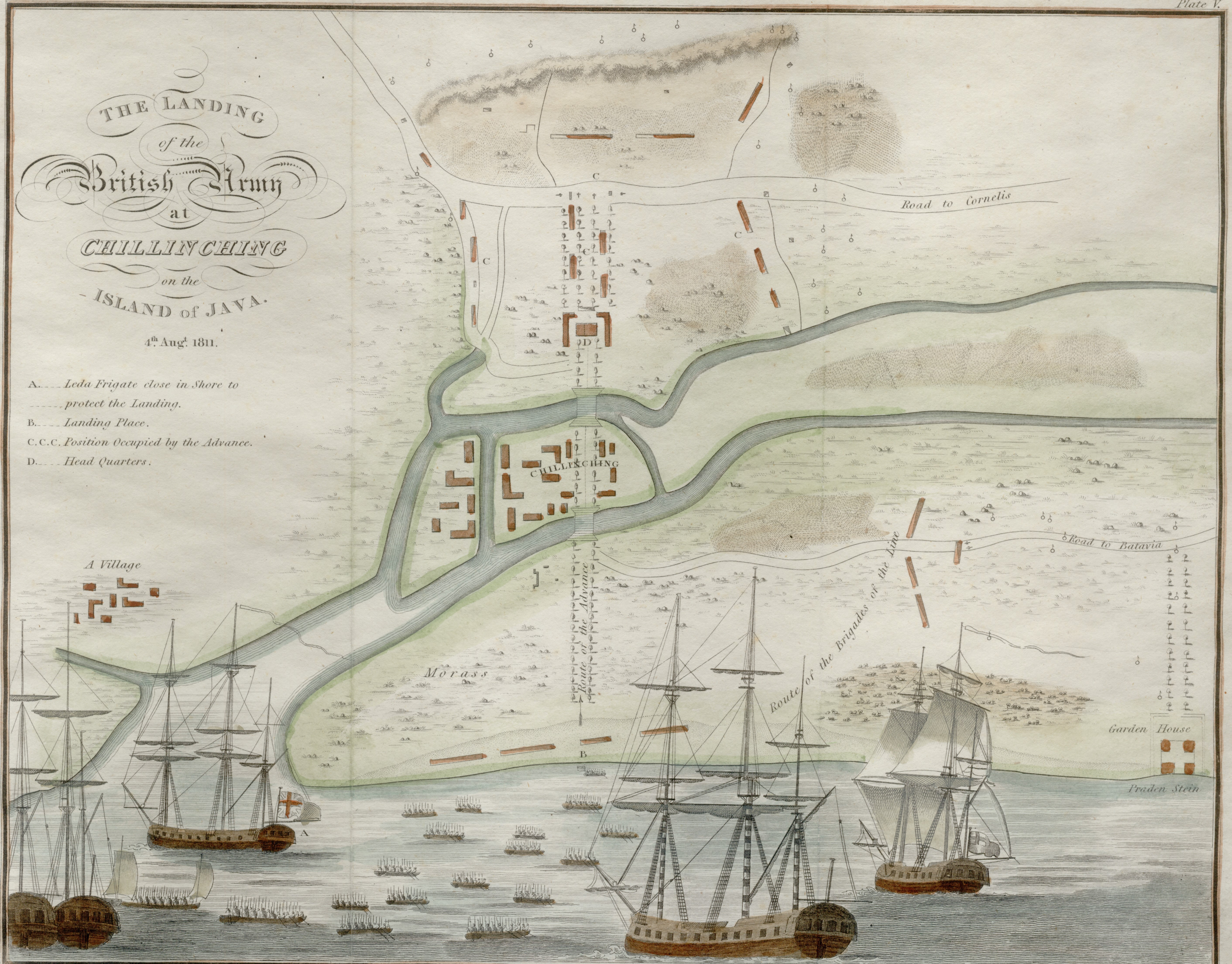
- British troops landing at Cilincing, Java
Date	4 August – 18 September 1811
Location	Java, Dutch East Indies
Result	British victory
Territorial changes	British occupation of Java

Belligerents
United Kingdom; East India Company	France

Commanders and leaders
Robert Stopford; Samuel Auchmuty; Robert Rollo Gillespie	Jan Willem Janssens

Strength
12,000 soldiers 25 warships	Unknown

The invasion of Java was a successful British amphibious operation against Java in the Dutch East Indies between August and September 1811 during the Napoleonic Wars. Originally established as a colony of the Dutch East India Company, Java remained in Dutch hands throughout the French Revolutionary Wars, during which the French invaded the Dutch Republic, transforming it into the Batavian Republic in 1795 and the Kingdom of Holland in 1806. The Kingdom of Holland was annexed to the First French Empire in 1810, and Java became a French colony, though it continued to be administered and garrisoned primarily with Dutch personnel.

After their capture of the French West Indies between 1809 and 1810, and a successful campaign against France's possessions in Mauritius from 1810 to 1811, British attention turned to the Dutch East Indies. An expedition was dispatched from British India in April 1811, while a small squadron of Royal Navy frigates was ordered to patrol off the island, raiding shipping and launching amphibious assaults against targets of opportunity. British troops landed on 4 August, and by 8 August the undefended city of Batavia capitulated. The defenders withdrew to a previously prepared fortified position, Fort Cornelis, which the British besieged, capturing it early in the morning of 26 August. The remaining defenders, a mixture of Dutch and French regulars and native militiamen, withdrew, pursued by the British. A series of amphibious and land assaults captured most of the remaining strongholds, and the city of Salatiga surrendered on 16 September, followed by the official capitulation of the island to the British on 18 September.

The island remained in British hands for the remainder of the Napoleonic Wars, but was returned to Dutch control in 1816, as per the terms of the Anglo-Dutch Treaty of 1814.

== Background ==
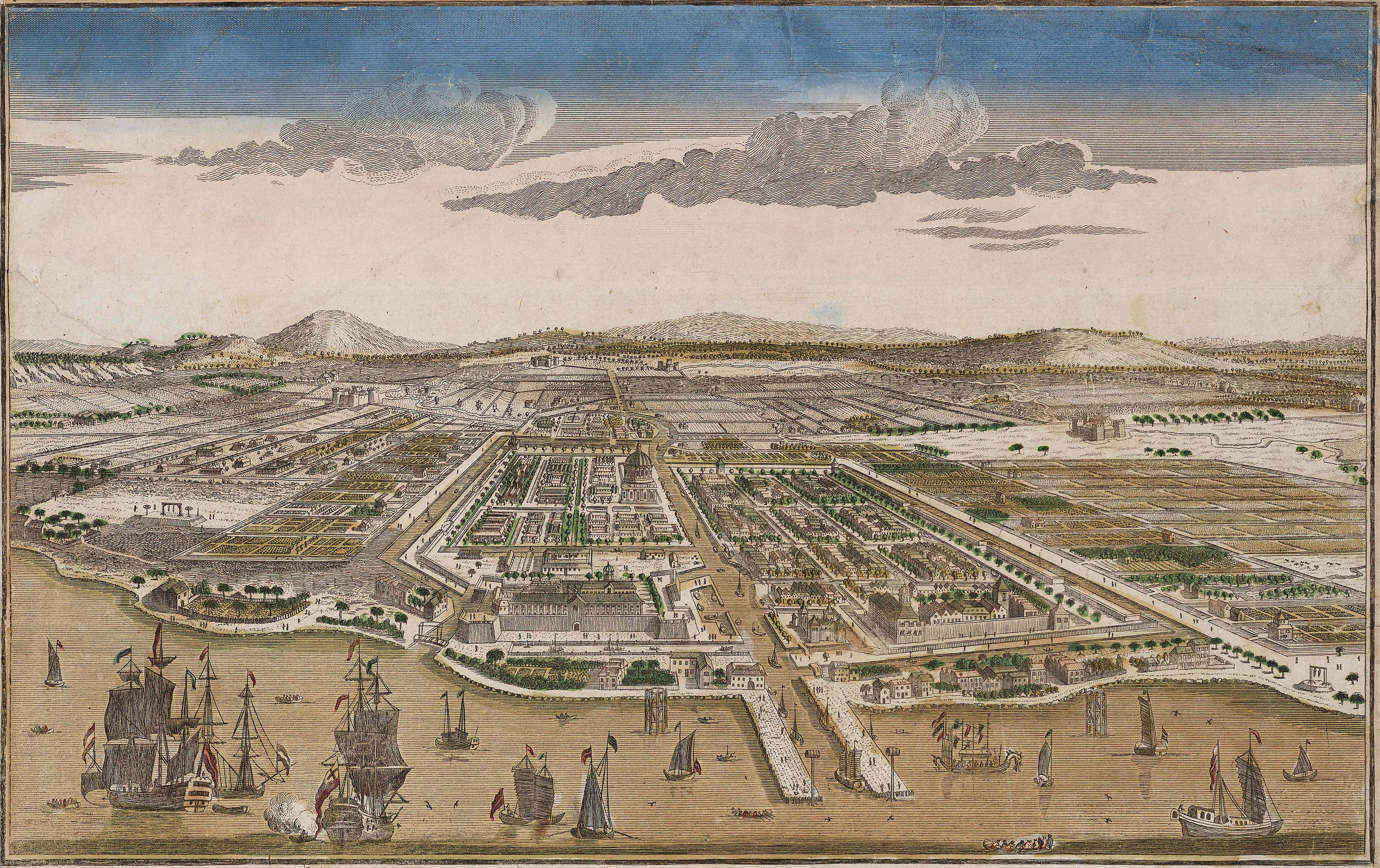
1780 illustration of Batavia, Dutch East Indies

The Dutch had been under French control for several years and were already at war with Britain. The strongly pro-French Herman Willem Daendels was appointed governor-general of the Dutch East Indies in 1807. He arrived in Java aboard the French privateer Virginie in 1808, and began fortifying the island against the British threat. In particular, Daendels established an entrenched camp named Fort Cornelis a few miles south of Batavia. He also improved the island's defences by building new hospitals, barracks, arms factories and a new military college.

In 1810, the Kingdom of Holland was formally annexed by France. As part of the resulting changes, Jan Willem Janssens was appointed personally by Napoleon Bonaparte to replace Daendels as governor-general. Janssens had previously served as governor of the Dutch Cape Colony, and had been forced to capitulate after being defeated by British forces at the Battle of Blaauwberg in 1806. Janssens accompanied a French frigate division under Joseph-François Raoul, which consisted of the frigates Méduse and Nymphe and the corvette Sappho, tasked with supporting Java. The division was accompanied by several hundred light infantrymen and several senior French officers. They arrived in Java in April 1811 without mishap. On 2 September, the frigates arrived at Surabaya, tailed by the 32-gun frigate HMS Bucephalus. Two days later, the British sloop HMS Barracouta joined the chase, but lost contact on 8 September. Four days later, Méduse and Nymphe chased Bucephalus, which escaped and broke contact the next day. The squadron was back in Brest, France on 22 December 1811.

British forces had already occupied the Dutch colonies of Ambon and the Molucca Islands; they had also recently captured the French colonies of Réunion and Isle de France in the Mauritius campaign of 1809–1811. Stamford Raffles, an East India Company official who had been forced to leave the Dutch colony at Malacca when Holland was annexed, suggested to Lord Minto, the Governor-General of India, that Java and the other Dutch possessions should be captured. With the large forces which had been made available to him for the Mauritius campaign, Minto enthusiastically adopted the suggestion, and even proposed to accompany the expedition himself.

=== Naval raids ===
The Navy was active off the Javanese coastline before and during the expedition. On 23 May 1811 a party from HMS Sir Francis Drake attacked a flotilla of fourteen Dutch gun vessels off Surabaya, capturing nine of them. Merak, in north-western Java, was attacked and the fort defending the town largely demolished by a party from HMS Minden and HMS Leda on 30 July. On the same day HMS Procris attacked a squadron of six Dutch gunboats flying French colours, capturing five and destroying the sixth.

== Invasion ==
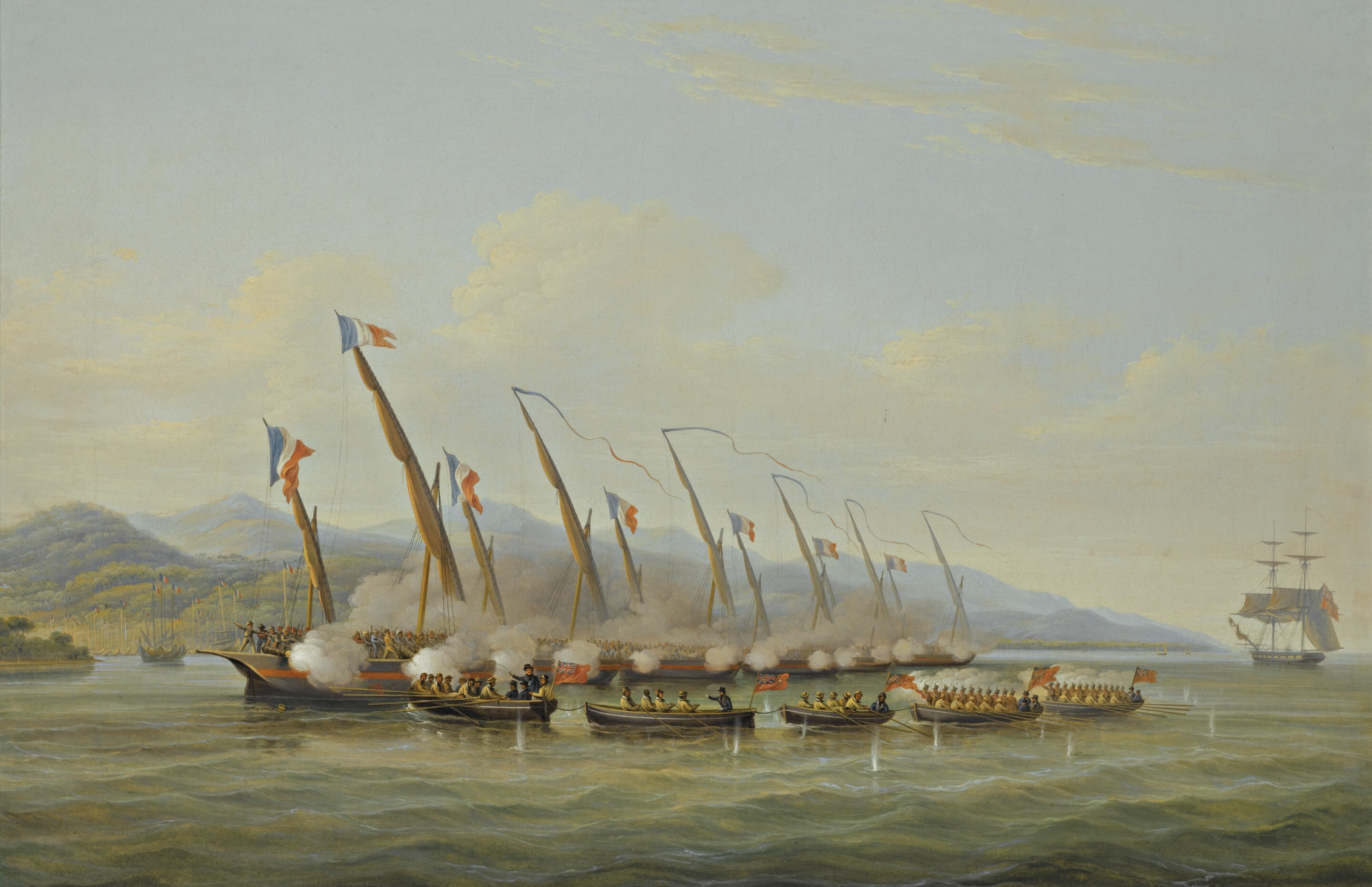
Captain Robert Maunsell capturing French Gunboats off the mouth of the Indramayo, July 1811

The British force, initially under the command of Vice-Admiral William O'Bryen Drury, and then after his death in March 1811, under Commodore William Robert Broughton, assembled at bases in India in early 1811. The first division of troops, under the command of Colonel Rollo Gillespie, left Madras on 18 April, escorted by a squadron under Captain Christopher Cole aboard the 36-gun HMS Caroline. They arrived at Penang on 18 May, and on 21 May the second division, led by Major-General Frederick Augustus Wetherall, which had left Calcutta on 21 April, escorted by a squadron under Captain Fleetwood Pellew, aboard the 38-gun HMS Phaeton joined them. The two squadrons sailed together, arriving at Malacca on 1 June, where they made contact with a division of troops from Bengal under Lieutenant-General Sir Samuel Auchmuty, escorted by Commodore Broughton aboard the 74-gun HMS Illustrious. Auchmuty and Broughton became the military and naval commanders in chief respectively of the expedition.

With the force now assembled Auchmuty had roughly 11,960 men under his command, the previous strength having been reduced by approximately 1,200 by sickness. Those too ill to travel on were landed at Malacca, and on 11 June the fleet sailed onwards. After calling at various points en route, the force arrived off Indramayu on 30 June. On 31 July Captain Maunsell commanding the sloop the Procris, discovered a convoy of 40 or 50 proas, escorted by six French gunboats in the mouth of the Indromayo river. Launching boats they were able to board and capture five of the French gunboats in quick succession; the sixth blew up. Meanwhile, however, the convoy escaped up the shallow muddy river.

There the fleet waited for a time for intelligence concerning the Dutch strength. Colonel Mackenzie, an officer who had been dispatched to reconnoitre the coast, suggested a landing site at Cilincing, an undefended fishing village 12 miles (19 km) east of Batavia. The fleet anchored off the Marandi River on 4 August, and began landing troops at 14:00. The defenders were taken by surprise, and nearly six hours passed before Franco-Dutch troops arrived to oppose the landing, by which time 8,000 British troops had been landed. A brief skirmish took place between the advance guards, and the Franco-Dutch forces were repulsed.

=== Fall of Batavia ===
On learning of the successful British landing, Janssens withdrew from Batavia with his army, which amounted to between 8,000 and 10,090 men, and garrisoned themselves in Fort Cornelis. The British advanced on Batavia, reaching it on 8 August and finding it undefended. The city surrendered to the forces under Colonel Gillespie, after Broughton and Auchmuty had offered promises to respect private property. The British were disappointed to find that part of the town had been set on fire, and many warehouses full of goods such as coffee and sugar had been looted or flooded, depriving them of prize money. On 9 August 1811 Rear-Admiral Robert Stopford arrived and superseded Commodore Broughton, who was judged to be too cautious. Stopford had orders to supersede Rear-Admiral Albemarle Bertie as commander in chief at the Cape, but on his arrival he learnt of Vice-Admiral Drury's death, and the planned expedition to Java, and so travelled on.

=== British advances ===
General Janssens had always intended to rely on the tropical climate and disease to weaken the British army rather than oppose a landing. The British now advanced on Janssens's stronghold, reducing enemy positions as they went. The Dutch military and naval station at Weltevreeden fell to the British after an attack on 10 August. British losses did not exceed 100 while the defenders lost over 300. In one skirmish, one of Janssens's French subordinates, General Alberti, was killed when he mistook some British riflemen in their green uniforms for Dutch troops. Weltevreeden was six miles from Fort Cornelis and on 20 August the British began preparing fortifications of their own, some 600 yards from the Franco-Dutch positions.

=== Siege of Fort Cornelis ===
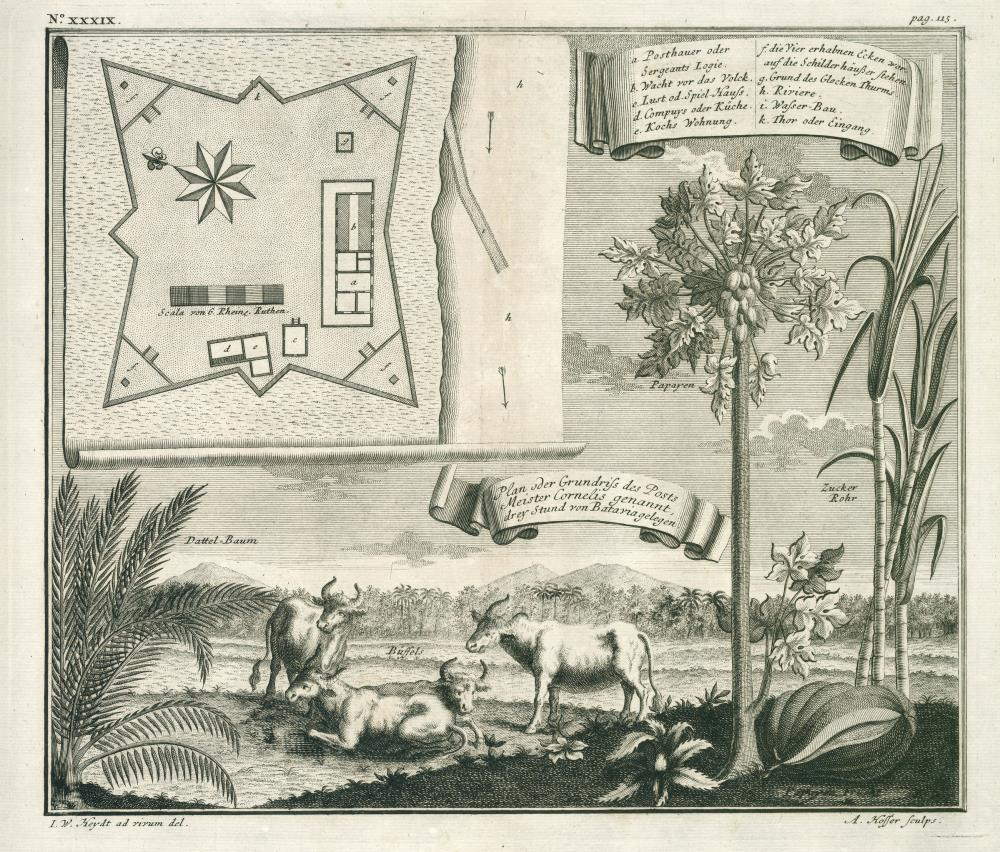
Diagram of Fort Cornelis, Batavia.

Fort Cornelis measured 1 mile (1,600 m) in length by between 600 yards (550 m) and 800 yards (730 m) in breadth. Two hundred and eighty cannon were mounted on its walls and bastions. Its defenders were a mixed bag of Dutch, French and East Indies troops. Most of the locally raised East Indian troops were of doubtful loyalty and effectiveness, although there were some determined artillerymen from Celebes. The captured station at Weltevreeden proved an ideal base from which the British could lay siege to Fort Cornelis. On 14 August the British completed a trail through the forests and pepper plantations to allow them to bring up heavy guns and munitions, and opened siege works on the north side of the Fort. For several days, there were exchanges of fire between the fort and the British batteries, manned mainly by Royal Marines and sailors from HMS Nisus.

A sortie from the fort early on the morning of 22 August briefly seized three of the British batteries, until they were driven back by some of the Bengal Sepoys and the 69th Foot. The two sides then exchanged heavy fire, faltering on 23 August, but resuming on 24 August. The Franco-Dutch position worsened when a deserter helped General Rollo Gillespie to capture two of the redoubts by surprise. Gillespie, who was suffering from fever, collapsed, but recovered to storm a third redoubt. The French General Jauffret was taken prisoner. Two Dutch officers, Major Holsman and Major Muller, sacrificed themselves to blow up the redoubt's magazine.

The three redoubts were nevertheless the key to the defence, and their loss demoralised most of Janssens's East Indian troops. Many Dutch troops also defected, repudiating their allegiance to the French. The British stormed the fort at midnight on 25 August, capturing it after a bitter fight. The siege cost the British 630 casualties. The defenders' casualties were heavier, but only those among officers were fully recorded. Forty of them were killed, sixty-three wounded and 230 captured, including two French generals. Nearly 5,000 men were captured, including three general officers, 34 field officers, 70 captains and 150 subaltern officers. 1,000 men were found dead in the fort, with more being killed in the subsequent pursuit. Janssens escaped to Buitenzorg with a few survivors from his army, but was forced to abandon the town when the British approached.

Total British losses in the campaign after the fall of Fort Cornelis amounted to 141 killed, 733 wounded and 13 missing from the Army, and 15 killed, 45 wounded and three missing from the Navy; a total of 156 killed, 788 wounded and 16 missing by 27 August.

=== Later actions ===
Royal Navy ships continued to patrol off the coast, occasionally making raids on targets of opportunity. On 4 September two French 40-gun frigates, the Méduse and the Nymphe attempted to escape from Surabaya. They were pursued by the 36-gun HMS Bucephalus and the 18-gun HMS Barracouta, until Barracouta lost contact. Bucephalus pursued them alone until 12 September, when the French frigates came about and attempted to overhaul her. Bucephalus's commander, Captain Charles Pelly, turned about and tried to lead the pursuing French over shoals, but seeing the danger, they hauled off and abandoned the chase, returning to Europe.

On 31 August a force from the frigates HMS Hussar, HMS Phaeton and HMS Sir Francis Drake, and the sloop HMS Dasher captured the fort and town of Sumenep, on Madura Island in the face of a large Dutch defending force. The rest of Madura and several surrounding islands placed themselves under the British soon afterwards. Suspecting Janssens to be in Cirebon, a force was landed there from HMS Lion, HMS Nisus, HMS President, HMS Phoebe and HMS Hesper on 4 September, causing the defenders to promptly surrender. General Jamelle, a member of Janssens's staff, was captured in the fall of the town. The town and fort of Taggal surrendered on 12 September after HMS Nisus and HMS Phoebe arrived offshore.

While the navy took control of coastal towns, the army pushed on into the interior of the island. Janssens had been reinforced on 3 September by 1,200 mounted irregulars under Prince Prang Wedono and other Javanese militia. On 16 September Salatiga fell to the British. Janssens attacked a British force under Colonel Samuel Gibbs that day, but was repulsed. Many of the native militia killed their Dutch officers in the ensuing rout. With his effective force reduced to a handful of men, Janssens surrendered two days later, on 18 September.

== Aftermath ==
The Dutch-held islands of Amboyna, Harouka, Saparua, Nasso-Laut, Buru, Manipa, Manado, Copang, Amenang, Kemar, Twangwoo, and Ternate had surrendered to a force led by Captain Edward Tucker in 1810, while Captain Christopher Cole captured the Banda Islands, completing the conquest of Dutch possessions in the Maluku Islands. Java became the last major colonial possession in the East not under British control, and its fall marked the effective end of the war in these waters. Stamford Raffles was appointed Lieutenant Governor of Java. He ended Dutch administrative methods, liberalized the system of land tenure, and extended trade.

Britain returned Java and other East Indian possessions to the newly independent United Kingdom of the Netherlands under the terms of the Convention of London in 1814. One enduring legacy of the British occupation was the road rules, as the British had decreed that traffic should drive on the left, and this has endured in Indonesia to this day.

== Sepoy revolt ==
The Bengali sepoy regiments stationed in Yogyakarta in 1815, inspired by the Hindu rituals of the Surakarta court and the glory of the Javanese temples of Prambanan and Borobodur planned a revolt against the British. This plot was conjured with the help of Sunan and the sepoys planned to kill all the British officers, overthrow European power, and install a Bengali administration over the whole island. In the end, the plan never came to fruition. As described by British officer Sir Stamford Raffles:

the Hindus appear to have been gratified at discovering relics of their ancient religion and faith [in Java] and to have received without dislike a country in which they found themselves so much at home...the sepoys always pointed out that Java was the land of Brama. This they would say was the country in which their gods took delight; this must be the country described in their sacredbooks and not Hindustan, which, if ever the abode of the gods must have since been strangely altered, and that it was a sin and a shame that the land of Brama should remain in the hands of infidels

— Sir Stamford Raffles

He further stated that this revolt would ultimately have led to the reestablishment of Hinduism in Java and the expulsion of European power

The intimacy between this prince [Pakubuwana IV] and the Sepoys first commenced from his attending ceremonies of their religious worship, which was Hindu, and assisting them with several idols of that worship which had been preserved in his family. The conspirators availing themselves of the predilection of the prince for the religion of his ancestors, flattered him by addressing him as a descendant of the great Ráma [Rama], and a deliberate plan was formed, the object of which was to place the European provinces once more under a Hindu power. Had this plan been attended with success, it would probably have been followed by the almost immediate and general reconversion of the Javanese themselves to the Hindu faith

— Sir Stamford Raffles

The Sunan of Surakarta took an avid interest in the Hindu sepoys, and would attend Pooja with the Bengalis, who prayed to Javanese idols which likely had not seen worship in centuries. He would also allow them to take part in his court, and use his facilities for worship and training.

In Surakarta, however, the Sunan immediately responded to the sepoys' overtures by lending them Hindu images from the court collections and by providing money for the decoration of the statues and to light up the ghāt (platforms) on which they were placed. He also attended various ceremonies inside the fort, usually alone and dressed as a common Javanese, but sometimes also accompanied by members of his family when he would arrive by carriage (Carey 1977:302). In return, the Sunan welcomed leading sepoy conspirators into his court, sitting with them in the evenings at the Randingan, the place set aside for archery practice in the kraton, where he would interrogate them on the manner and customs of India and watch their gymnastic displays (Carey 1977:303, 317 note 61). The sepoys also told him about the history of Bengal, the strength of the British army in India and their victories there, stressing that the power of the farang (British) was entirely dependant on their British-Indian troops

== British order of battle ==
Stopford's fleet on his arrival on 9 August to assume command of the expedition, consisted of the following ships, dispersed around the Javanese coast:

Rear-Admiral Stopford's fleet
Ship	Rate	Guns	Navy	Commander	Notes
HMS Scipion	Third rate	74		Rear-Admiral Hon. Robert Stopford; Captain James Johnson	
HMS Illustrious	Third rate	74		Commodore William Robert Broughton; Captain Robert Festing	
HMS Minden	Third rate	74		Captain Edward Wallis Hoare	
HMS Lion	Third rate	64		Captain Henry Heathcote	
HMS Akbar	Fifth rate	44		Captain Henry Drury	
HMS Nisus	Fifth rate	38		Captain Philip Beaver	
HMS President	Fifth rate	38		Captain Samuel Warren	
HMS Hussar	Fifth rate	38		Captain James Coutts Crawford	
HMS Phaeton	Fifth rate	38		Captain Fleetwood Pellew	
HMS Leda	Fifth rate	36		Captain George Sayer	
HMS Caroline	Fifth rate	36		Captain Christopher Cole	
HMS Modeste	Fifth rate	36		Captain George Elliot	
HMS Phoebe	Fifth rate	36		Captain James Hillyar	
HMS Bucephalus	Fifth rate	36		Captain Charles Pelly	
HMS Doris	Fifth rate	36		Captain William Jones Lye	
HMS Cornelia	Fifth rate	32		Captain Henry Folkes Edgell	
HMS Psyche	Fifth rate	32		Captain John Edgcumbe	
HMS Sir Francis Drake	Fifth rate	32		Captain George Harris	
HMS Procris	Brig-sloop	18		Commander Robert Maunsell	
HMS Barracouta	Brig-sloop	18		Commander William Fitzwilliam Owen	
HMS Hesper	Ship-sloop	18		Commander Barrington Reynolds	
HMS Harpy	Sloop	18		Commander Henderson Bain	
HMS Hecate	Brig-sloop	18		Commander Henry John Peachey	
HMS Dasher	Sloop	18		Commander Benedictus Marwood Kelly	
HMS Samarang	Sloop	18		Commander Joseph Drury	
In addition to the vessels of the Royal Navy, the East India Company provided the services of several of their ships, led by Malabar under Commodore John Hayes. The EIC vessels included Ariel, Aurora, Mornington, Nautilus, Psyche, Thetis, and Vestal.
See also: Transport vessels for the British invasion of Java (1811) When one adds in the transport vessels, and several gunboats captured as the campaign progressed, Stopford commanded nearly a hundred ships.
The British Army troops attached to the force included 12,000 soldiers from the 22nd Light Dragoons, 14th Foot, 59th Foot, 69th Foot, 78th Foot; 89th Foot, and 102nd Foot. The Navy provided contingents of the Royal Marines. The EIC contributed several regiments of Madras Native Infantry and Bengal Native Infantry, with half of the overall troop strength consisting of EIC Indian troops. General Samuel Auchmuty was the overall commander, but he delegated the field command to Major General Rollo Gillespie.

== See also ==
Joseph Higginson (1792-1881), last surviving and confirmed veteran of the Invasion of Java (1811). Served as Sergeant aboard HMS President, and lived to the age of 88, 70 years after the invasion.
