= HMS Hecate (1809) =

Brig of the Royal Navy (1809–1817) and Chilean warship (1818–1828)

- Hecate

History

United Kingdom
- Name: HMS Hecate
- Namesake: Hecate
- Builder: John King, Upnor
- Launched: 1809
- Commissioned: 1809
- Decommissioned: 1817
- Honors and awards: Naval General Service Medal with clasp "Java"
- Fate: Sold October 1817

Chile
- Name: Galvarino
- Namesake: Galvarino
- Acquired: 1818
- Fate: Broken up, 1828

General characteristics
- Class & type: Cruizer-class brig-sloop
- Tons burthen: 384 70/94 (bm)
- Length: 100 ft 6 in (30.6 m) o/a; 770 ft 4 in (234.8 m) (keel)
- Beam: 30 ft 6 in (9.3 m)
- Depth of hold: 12 ft 9 in (3.9 m)
- Sail plan: Brig
- Complement: 121
- Armament: 16 × 32-pounder carronades; 2 × 6-pounder bow guns

HMS Hecate was a Royal Navy 18-gun Cruizer-class brig-sloop, built by John King at Upnor and launched in 1809. After serving in the British Navy, essentially entirely in the East Indies, she served in the Chilean Navy as Galvarino from 1818 until she was broken up in 1828.

== Royal Navy service ==
Hecate was commissioned in 1809 under Commander William Buchanan. Commander Edward Wallis Hoare replaced him in October and sailed for the East Indies on 31 October.

In 1810, Lieutenant George Rennie became acting commander and Hecate was detailed for service with the squadron under Admiral Albemarle Bertie engaged in the Invasion of Île de France. (Note: The Admiral's share of the prize money was £2650 5s 2d. A first-class share was worth £278 19s 5 3/4d; a sixth-class share, that of an ordinary seaman, was worth £3 7s 6 1/4d. A fourth and final payment was made in July 1828. A first-class share was worth £29 19s 5 1/4d; a sixth-class share was worth 8s 2 1/2d. This time, Bertie received £314 14s 3 1/2d.)

In 1811 Hecate was under Commander Thomas Graham until July, when Commander Henry John Peachey assumed command. From 3 August she was part of the fleet involved in the invasion of Java, which ended with the surrender of Dutch and French forces on 16 September. For this service all of her crew who had survived to 1847 and chose to were entitled to claim the Naval General Service Medal with clasp "Java". In 1815 Hecate also shared in the prize money arising out of the invasion.

Peachey was promoted to post-captain on 7 August 1812 and removed to Malacca. Lieutenant William Case may have followed Peachey as acting commander, but then the newly promoted Commander Case took command of Samarang, and Commander Joseph Drury transferred from Samarang to Hecate. At some point in 1812 pirates from the Sultanate of Sambas, in western Borneo, captured nine sailors from Hecate and killed or enslaved them, after cutting their hamstrings or otherwise mutilating them. In June 1813 Hecate participated in a punitive expedition against the Sultanate of Sambas.

Hecate sailed for Madras in January 1814 and her next commander, from 4 February 1814, was Commander John Allen. On 20 November 1815 command passed to John Reynolds.

Hecate arrived in Portsmouth on 17 August 1816, from Trincomalee, which she had left on 20 March. She had sailed via the Cape of Good Hope and Saint Helena. On 22 May 1817 the Admiralty offered Hecate, then lying at Portsmouth, for sale.

== Chilean Navy service ==
On 30 October 1817 the Admiralty sold Hecate to Mr. Parkin for £860. She sailed to Buenos Aires, where she was also known as Lucy. She was resold to the Chilean Revolutionary government, arriving in Chile on 9 November 1818 under the command of Captain Guisse. She served the new Chilean Navy as Galvarino, first under Captain Spry (until Admiral Thomas Cochrane dismissed him) and then under Captain Winter. On 2 October 1819 she was at the second attack on Callao where a lieutenant onboard was killed by Spanish fire. In 1821, while under the command of Captain I. Esmond, her crew mutinied and refused to go to sea until they had received their back pay and prize money.

She participated in the Freedom Expedition of Perú, but after the final confrontation between San Martín and Cochrane and the subsequent loss of many officers and seamen to the new Peruvian Navy, Lautaro and Galvarino were sent back to Valparaíso to ease the demand for seamen.

== Fate ==
Galvarino was broken up 1828.
