= Henry Peachey, 3rd Baron Selsey =

Royal Navy officer and art collector

Captain The Right Honourable The Lord Selsey FRS
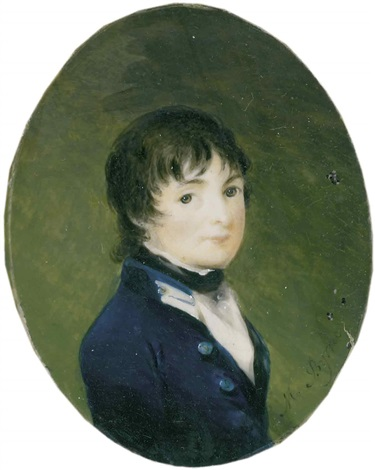
- Peachey as a midshipman, by Mary Byrne
- Born: 4 September 1787
- Died: 10 March 1838 (aged 50); Florence, Italy
- Burial place: West Dean Park, Sussex
- Spouse: Anna Maria Louisa Irby (m. 1817–1838)
- Military career
- Allegiance: United Kingdom
- Branch: Royal Navy
- Service years: c.1800–1838
- Rank: Captain
- Commands: HMS Hecate; HMS Malacca; HMS Sir Francis Drake
- Conflicts: French Revolutionary Wars; Napoleonic Wars; Invasion of the Spice Islands; Invasion of Java

Captain Henry John Peachey, 3rd Baron Selsey, FRS (4 September 1787 – 10 March 1838) was a Royal Navy officer and peer. Serving on the East Indies Station during the Napoleonic Wars, he participated in the Invasion of the Spice Islands and Invasion of Java, rising from lieutenant to captain. He returned to England in 1813 commanding the frigate HMS Sir Francis Drake and had no further service.

Peachey became Baron Selsey upon the death of his father in 1816; he was active in the House of Lords as a Whig. A Fellow of the Royal Society from 1817, he was patron to several notable sculptors including Richard James Wyatt and Josephus Kendrick. With his family seat at West Dean Park, Peachey may have used his other properties, including Newsells Park, to hold his collection of marbles and library.

== Early life ==
Henry John Peachey was born on 4 September 1787, the eldest surviving son of John Peachey, later the second Baron Selsey, and Hester Elizabeth née Jennings. Peachey's maternal grandfather was Michael Burke, 10th Earl of Clanricarde. The family lived at West Dean Park, a large mansion surrounded by parkland 5 miles (8 km) from Chichester, rebuilt by Peachey's father.

== Naval career ==
Peachey joined the Royal Navy, aged thirteen, during the French Revolutionary Wars. He was promoted to lieutenant on 5 January 1807. With the Napoleonic Wars underway, he served as first lieutenant of the 54-gun fourth-rate HMS Cornwallis on the East Indies Station. Peachey participated in the Invasion of the Spice Islands in 1810, and was present in Cornwallis at the capture of Amboyna Island in February. For his services there he was mentioned in despatches.

Staying in the vicinity of the Spice Islands, on 1 March Cornwallis came across the 8-gun Dutch brig Margaretta. After a chase through the day Margaretta fled into a small bay on Amblaw Island. Peachey was given the task of capturing the Dutch brig, for which he was assigned command of three boats from Cornwallis. Setting out for the bay as night fell, it took them all night to reach Margaretta. In the early morning Peachey's force boarded the brig, whose crew fought back, firing grapeshot and muskets at the British and attacking them with swords and pikes. After a short engagement in which the commanding officer of Cornwallis, Captain William Montagu, described Margaretta as "defended bravely", the ship was captured by Peachey. Peachey's force had five men wounded, while the Dutch had one killed and 20 wounded. Margaretta had on board money and supplies meant for Ternate. A portrait of Peachey, depicting him just prior to the boarding of Margaretta, was exhibited by Sir William Beechey at the Royal Academy in late 1816.

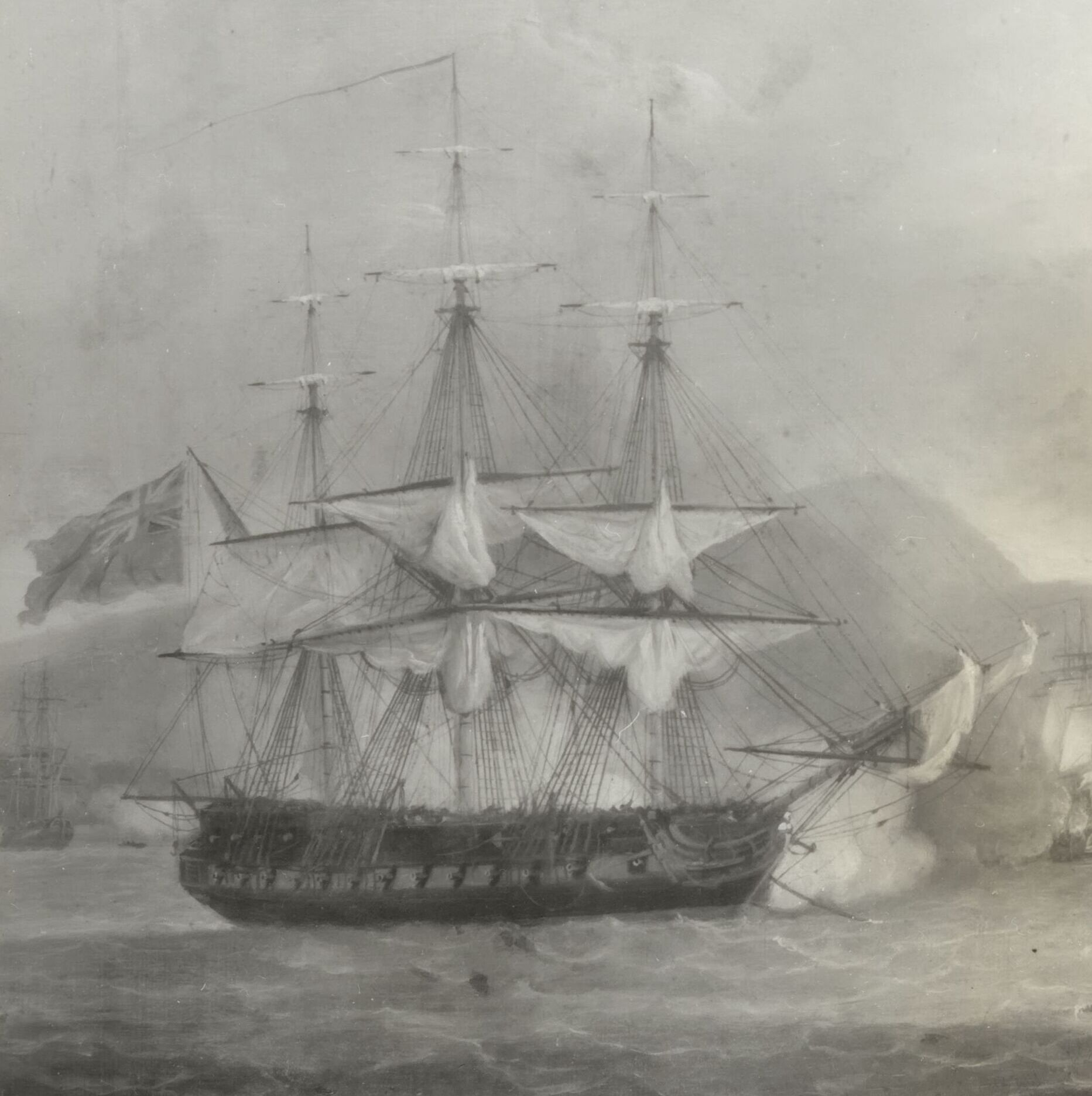
HMS Sir Francis Drake, Peachey's final command

Peachey was given command of the 18-gun brig-sloop HMS Hecate in July 1811, in which he took part in the Invasion of Java later in the year. During this period he was also promoted to commander. He continued in Hecate until he was promoted to captain on 7 August 1812. Peachey was then given command of the 36-gun frigate HMS Malacca at Madras. Later in the year he transferred to command the 32-gun frigate HMS Sir Francis Drake. Peachey returned to England with Sir Francis Drake in the following year, escorting a convoy of merchant ships valued at over £3,000,000 (equivalent to £179,900,000 in 2025). The ship arrived at Deptford on 28 May. This was Peachey's last active service in the Royal Navy.

== Politics ==
Peachey's father died on 27 June 1816 and he inherited his barony, becoming the third Baron Selsey. Taking his seat in the House of Lords, Peachey generally supported the Whig faction. When George IV introduced the Pains and Penalties Bill 1820 in an attempt to divorce Caroline of Brunswick, Peachey was one of eighteen peers to enter protests against it on 6 November, arguing that adultery could not be proven and the benefit of the doubt should have been given to Caroline. He also voted in favour of the Reform Act 1832.

== Patron of the arts ==
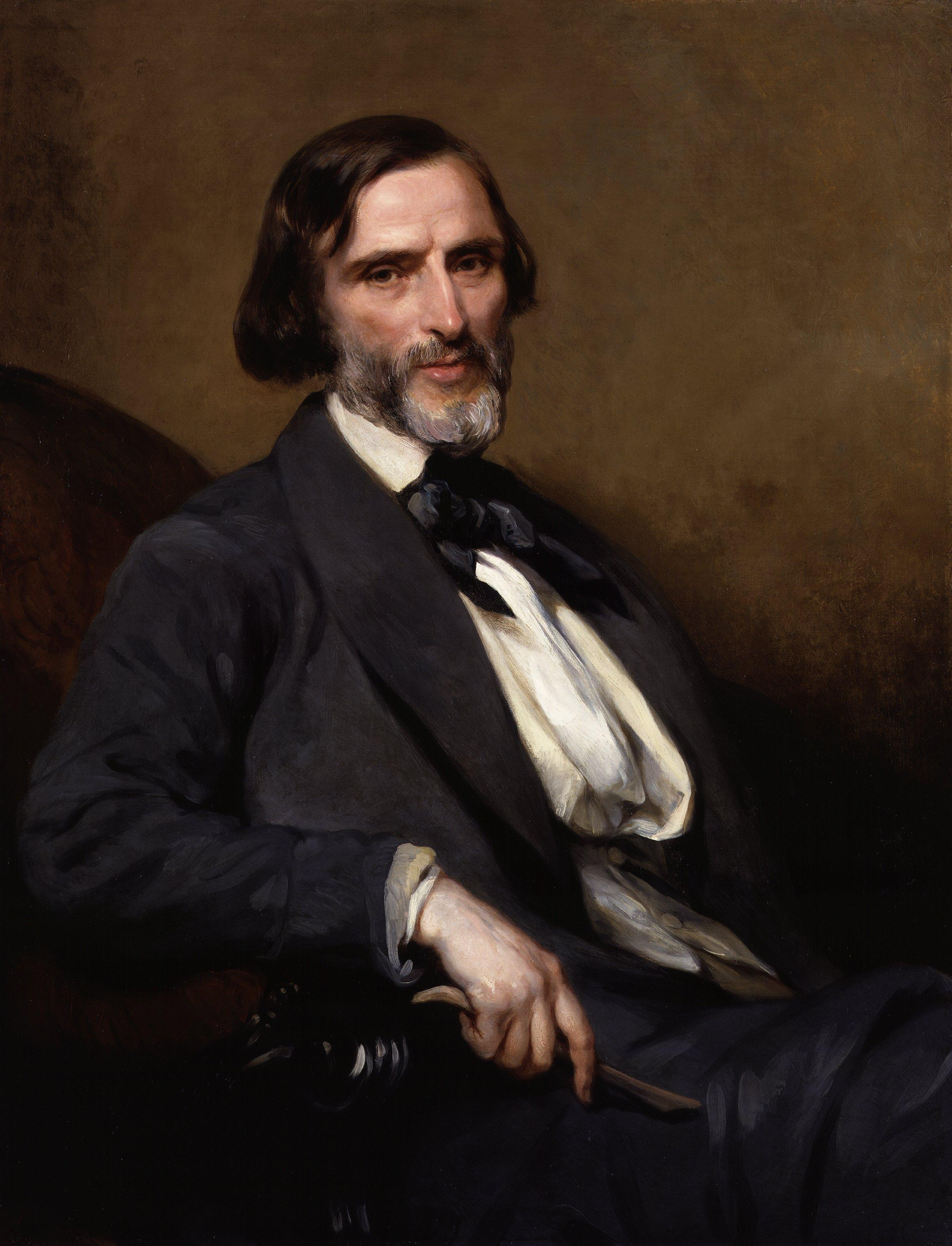
Peachey was a patron of the sculptor John Gibson

Peachey was appointed a Fellow of the Royal Society, as both previous barons had been, on 27 March 1817. He took after his father, who had been a patron of the arts, owning Old Master paintings such as a portrait by Pompeo Batoni. Peachey's primary interest was contemporary sculpture, as well as purchasing books, drawings, and prints. He formed a collection of sculptures known as the Selsey marbles, which he intended Newsells Park in Hertfordshire to house. He also owned a townhouse, 33 Lower Grosvenor Street in London, where the collection may have been held.

Peachey was patron to a number of prominent sculptors, including Joseph Nollekens, Josephus Kendrick, Richard James Wyatt, John Gibson, and Luigi Bienaimé. Kendrick and Wyatt produced busts of Peachey, both of which have now been lost.

== Personal life ==
Peachey married Anna Maria Louisa Irby, a daughter of Frederick Irby, 2nd Baron Boston, on 21 October 1817. They had no issue. Peachey's younger brother John William Peachey, a clergyman, died unmarried on 6 July 1837. Peachey survived him for only a year, dying in Florence on 10 March 1838, aged fifty. His body was transported back to England to be buried at West Dean Park.

With no extant male relatives, the Selsey barony and attached baronetcy both became extinct. Peachey had one sister, Caroline Mary Peachey. She married the clergyman Leveson Venables-Vernon-Harcourt, but also had no children. Peachey's wife survived him, dying in 1870; his sister inherited his estates and owned them until her death in 1871. Peachey's library was then broken up by Ulick de Burgh, 1st Marquess of Clanricarde, who had inherited, and was sold at Sotheby's on 20 June 1872.

== Citations ==
Peerage of Great Britain
Preceded by John Peachey	Baron Selsey; 1816–1838	Extinct
