= Asia (1797 ship) =

- Dona Maria II (centre) at the Battle of Cape St. Vincent

History

Great Britain
- Name: Asia
- Owner: 1803:Smith, Forbes, and Company, and Homajee Bomanjee; 1805:Lanby
- Builder: Bombay Dockyard
- Launched: 1797
- Fate: Sold 1805

United Kingdom
- Name: HMS Sir Francis Drake
- Namesake: Francis Drake
- Acquired: 1805 by purchase
- Commissioned: 1808
- Honours and awards: Naval General Service Medal (NGSM) with clasp "Java"
- Fate: Sold 1825

United Kingdom
- Name: Asia
- Owner: Blythe & Co.
- Acquired: 1825 by purchase
- Fate: Sold 1831

Portugal
- Name: Dona Maria II
- Namesake: Maria II of Portugal
- Acquired: 1831 by purchase
- Fate: Destroyed in an explosion at Macau in 1850

General characteristics
- Tons burthen: 735, or 736, or 740, or 75130/94, or 783 (bm)
- Length: 81 ft 9 in (24.9 m)
- Beam: 20 ft 9 in (6.3 m)
- Complement: Storeship:88; 1833:270
- Armament: Storeship: Upper deck:2 × 9-pounder guns + 14 × 24-pounder carronades; QD:4 × 24-pounder carronades; Fc:2 × 9-pounder guns; 1833:30 × 12-pounder guns; 1833:42 × 18-pounder guns and carronades

Asia was built at Bombay Dockyard in 1797. She made at least two voyages for the East India Company (EIC) before the Royal Navy purchased her in 1805 in the East Indies. The Royal Navy renamed her HMS Sir Francis Drake and rated her as a frigate. She served in the Java campaign of 1806–1807. When she returned to England in 1813 she was refitted as a storeship. Later, she became the flagship, at Newfoundland, for the governors of Newfoundland before the Admiralty sold her in 1825.

Her owners renamed her Asia and she sailed between Britain and London until 1831 when Portuguese interests purchased her. She then became the frigate Dona Maria II for the Liberal forces that were attempting to install the rightful queen, Maria II, to the Portuguese throne, and overthrow Miguel I, who had usurped the throne. In early 1849, a conflict developed between the Portuguese authorities in Macau and China over who would collect the colony's taxes and tariffs. Dona Maria II sailed to Macau as part of a small squadron, where an internal explosion destroyed her in the harbour on 29 October.

== East Indiaman ==
Asia was launched at Bombay in 1797. On 1 December 1799 Captain George McInnes sailed from Bombay, bound for England, on a voyage on behalf of the EIC. Asia was at Cochin on 27 December and the Cape of Good Hope on 24 February 1800. She reached St Helena on 15 March, and arrived at the Downs on 30 May.

Captain McInnes made a second voyage to London on behalf of the EIC, leaving Bombay on 15 March 1802. Asia reached St Helena on 25 May and arrived at Deptford on 30 July.

She appeared in Lloyd's Register (LR) in 1802 with G. Innes, master, "India" as owner, and trade London–India. Asia was listed in 1803 as being registered in Bombay with Smith, Forbes, and Company, and Homajee Bomanjee, owners, and George M'Innes, master. The Register of Shipping (RS), for 1805 showed her with M'Innis, master, Lanby, owner, and trade London–India.

== Royal Navy ==
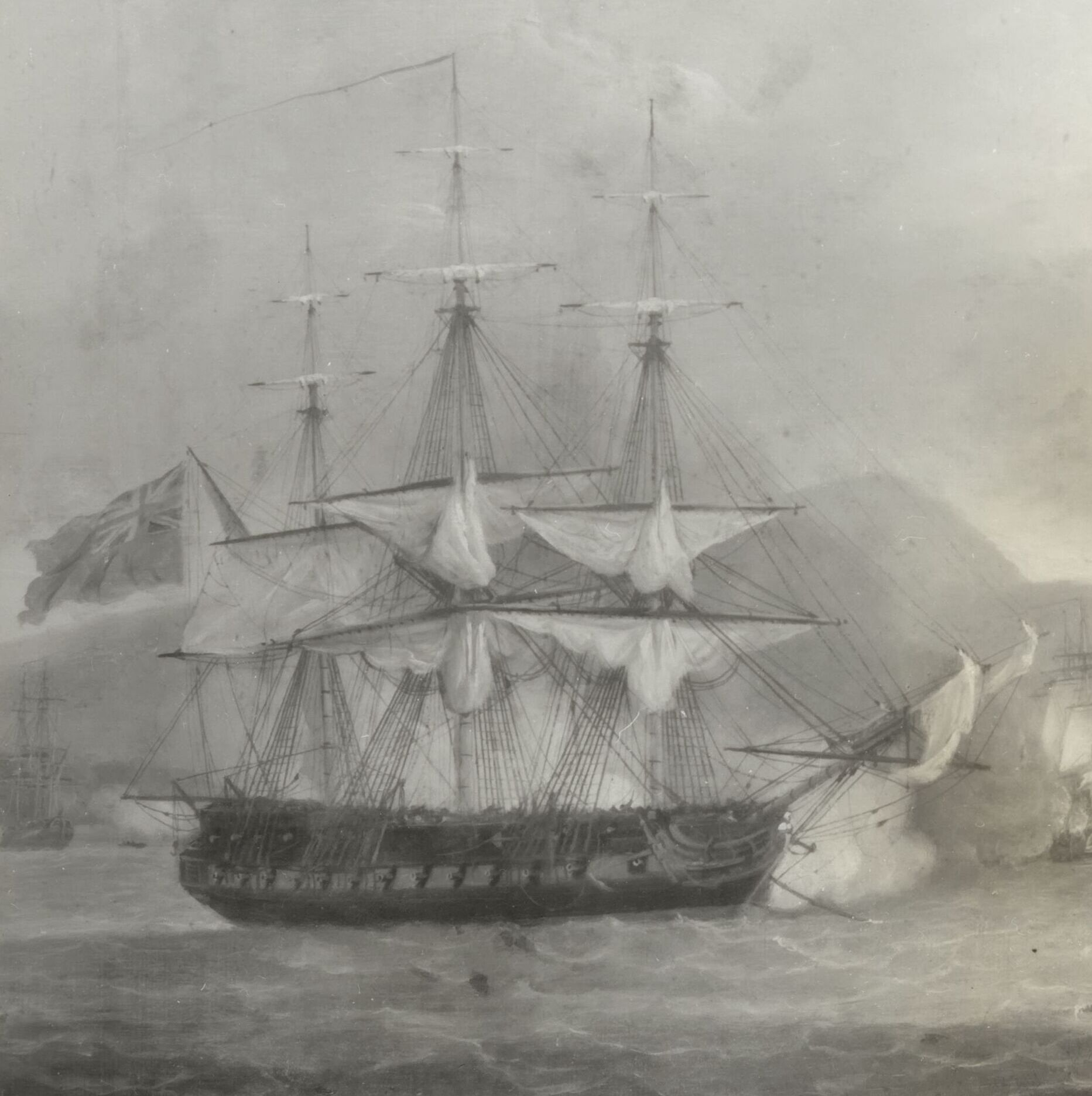
Sir Francis Drake at the raid on Batavia

In 1805 the Admiralty purchased Asia in the East Indies. It commissioned her as a fifth rate under the command of Commander James Tait, and named her HMS Sir Francis Drake. On 27 November 1806, Sir Francis Drake participated in the raid on Batavia as part of the Java campaign of 1806–1807.

On 13 May 1810 Sir Francis Drake was in company with HMS Cornelia and Diana when they captured some slaves at Diego Garcia. (Note: A first-class share of the bounty money was worth £299 11s 4d; a sixth-class share, that of an ordinary seaman, was worth £3 1s 0 3/4d.)

Harris wrote a letter on 1 August reporting the capture, off Java, of a Dutch ship of eight guns and 33 men, a schooner of six guns and 13 men, and a coasting vessel.

A second letter, dated 5 August, reported that boats from HMS Belliqueux and Sir Francis Drake destroyed a French privateer ketch and two gun boats in Bantam Bay. Lieutenant Joseph Prior of Belliquex commanded the boat party. The action took place under fire from shore batteries. A seaman from Sir Francis Drake was killed; he was the sole British casualty from the operation. (Note: Head money was paid to the officers and crews of Belliqueux and Sir Francis Drake in 1824 for the destruction on 5 August 1810 of a French privateer, name unknown, and four gunboats. A first-class share was worth £58 6s 11 1/2d; a sixth-class share was worth 6s 0 1/2d.)

A third letter, dated 1 October, reported that between 9 August and 8 September, Sir Francis Drake's boats destroyed seven Dutch gunboats, five pirate prows, and 35 Dutch trading vessels.

In 1847 the Admiralty awarded the NGSM with clasp "Java" to all surviving claimants from the campaign.

In 1812 Commander Henry Peachey replaced Harris, only to be replaced in 1813 by Captain Barrington Reynolds. Sir Francis Drake arrived at Deptford on 28 May. Captain John Maples briefly took command in August, before she went into Ordinary.

Between July and September Sir Francis Drake underwent fitting as a storeship. Mr. Thomas Hoskins commissioned her in 1814 as a storeship for Gibraltar. She remained there until the end of 1815, when she returned to England.

Between February and May 1817 she underwent fitting as a flagship to sail to Newfoundland. Captain John Bowker commissioned her in February at Woolwich and then on 22 August sailed her to Newfoundland. At Newfoundland she was the flagship first for Vice-admiral Francis Pickmore, and after he died in February 1818, Vice-admiral Sir Charles Hamilton. Pickmore was also governor of Newfoundland and after his death Captain Bowker, served as acting governor until Governor Sir Charles Hamilton arrived.

Lieutenant Valentine Munbee took command on 18 December 1819. At that time her armament was reduced to 3 guns for signalling purposes. Many of her officers and crew returned home in HMS Egeria. She remained in Newfoundland until at least 1822. She was paid off at Chatham in 1824.

Disposal: "The Principal Officers and Commissioners of His Majesty's Navy" offered "Sir Francis Drake storeship, 751 tons", "Lying at Deptford", for sale on 13 October 1825. (Note: Although one source suggests that she was offered for sale on condition that she be broken up, there is no such condition in the advertisements for her sale. The same source did not realize that she had been sold and so listed her again as having been launched at Bombay for Blythe Bros.)

== Merchantman ==
Blythe Brothers, her new owners, returned the ship's name to Asia. She appeared in Lloyd's Register (LR) and the Register of Shipping for 1827 with J.Webster, master, Blythe, owner, and trade London–India. She had undergone a large repair in 1827. Lloyd's Register and the Register of Shipping for 1832 carried the same information.

== Portuguese Navy ==
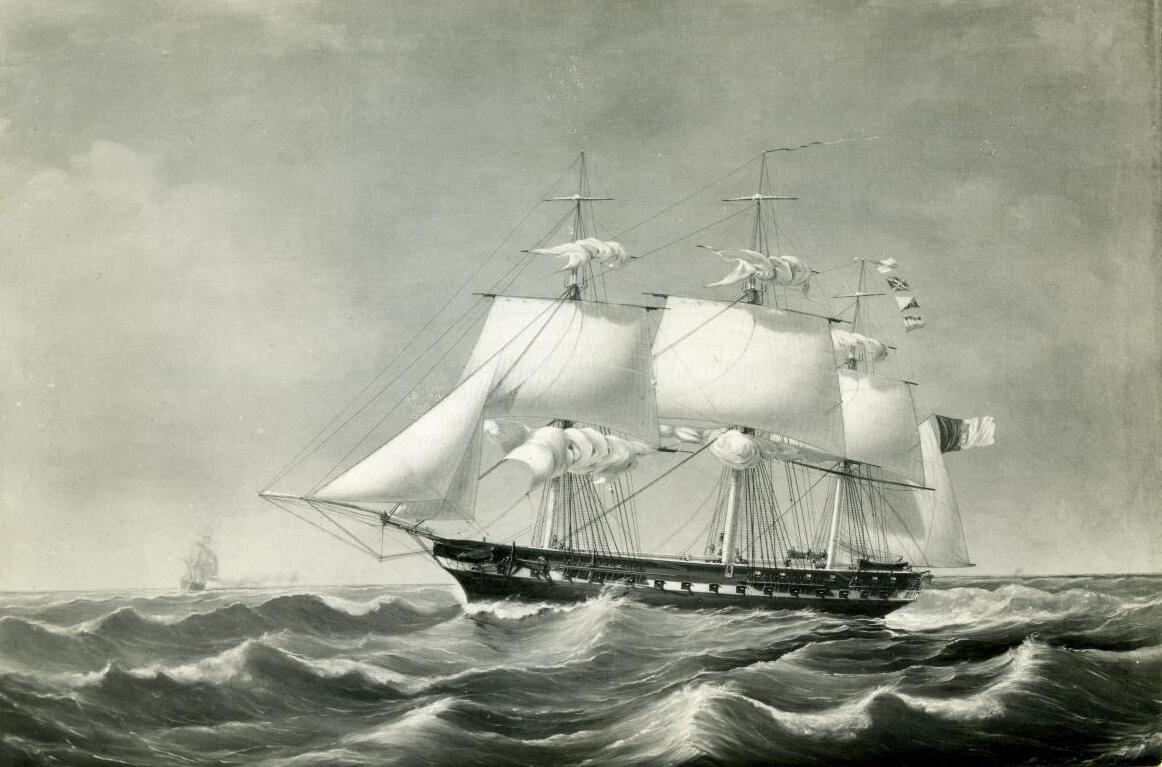
Dona Maria II under sail

In 1831 the ex-Emperor of Brazil, Dom Pedro, Duke of Braganza, wished to defeat his brother, Dom Miguel, who had usurped the throne of Portugal, and to install Pedro's daughter as the rightful queen, Dona Maria II. Dom Pedro acquired a small squadron that included several vessels purchased in England, one of which was Sir Francis Drake. The Portuguese renamed her Dona Maria II, and classed her as a 44-gun frigate. Dom Pedro appointed Captain George Sartorius admiral of his small fleet. Sartorius conveyed Pedro's expeditionary force from the Azores and safely effected their landing at Mindelo in July 1832, from where they were able to occupy Porto.

Despite this success, Sartorius also had to contend with many difficulties; promised supplies rarely arrived, and his crews consequently became mutinous or deserted. Sartorius spent a great deal of his own money in keeping the fleet together. When he threatened to sail off with it until he was paid, Dom Pedro sent two English officers to the flagship; one to arrest Sartorius, the other to take command. Sartorius promptly confined them both aboard. In June 1833, Sartorius handed command over to Captain Sir Charles Napier. Dona Maria II was one of the five vessels of the naval squadron under Admiral Napier that decisively defeated the Miguelite forces at the Battle of Cape St. Vincent on 5 July 1833. Dona Maria II, under the command of Captain Henry, captured Princess Real, of 56 guns and 640 men, by boarding. Dona Maria II had suffered four men killed and 16 wounded.

== Loss ==
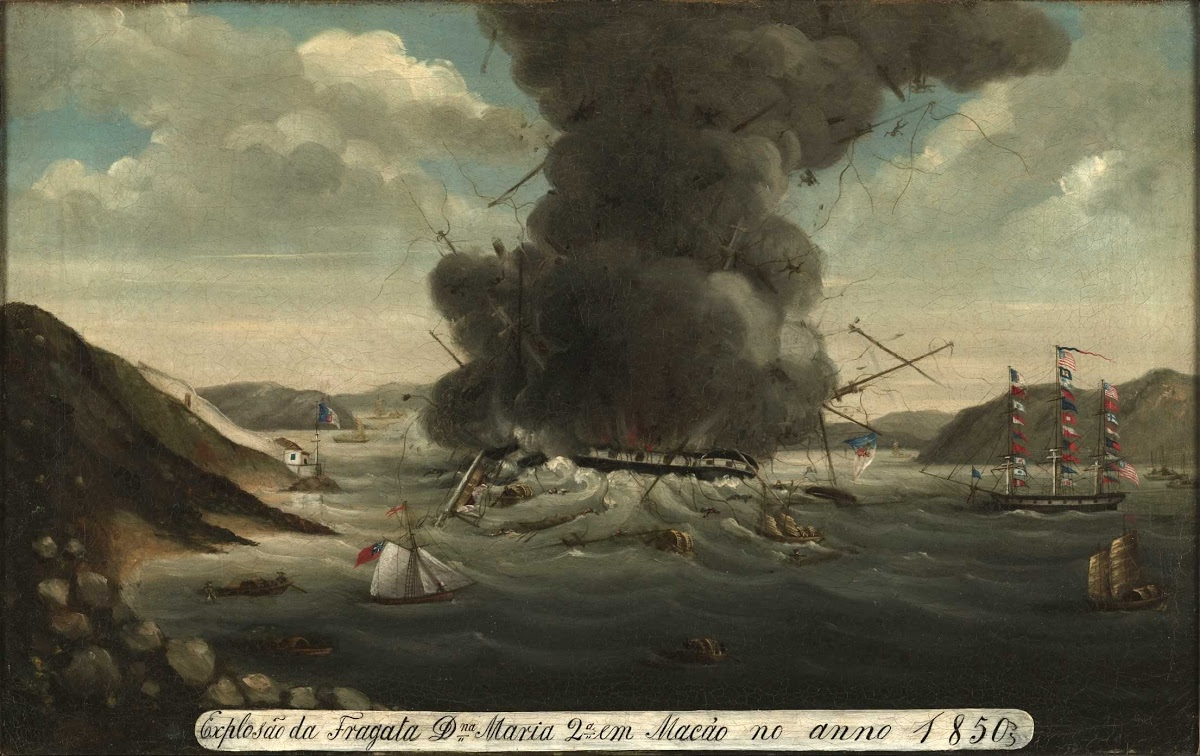
Dona Maria II exploding on 29 October 1850

In early 1849 conflict developed between the Portuguese authorities in Macau and the Chinese government over who could collect taxes and tariffs at Macau. After the assassination on 22 August 1849 of the governor of Macau, Amaral, Portugal sent out three ships for the protection of Macau, Dona Maria II and the corvettes Dom João I and Iris. (Note: Dom João I, of 24 guns and 516 tons burthen, had been launched at Daman in 1828. Iris, of 24 guns, had been launched in 1843 at Lisbon.) They brought with them Admiral Alexandrino da Cunha to take up the post of Governor. They also brought marines from Goa. Da Cunha, however, died of natural causes on 6 July 1850, some six weeks after his arrival at Macau.

On 29 October Dona Maria II, Dom João I, and Iris were in Macau Roads, off Taipa. The sloop-of-war USS Marion was nearby. The vessels fired a salute at noon on occasion of the birthday of Ferdinand II of Portugal. At 2:30 p.m. Dona Maria II exploded and sank. Dom João I, Iris, and Marion sent their boats, but they were only able to rescue a few men, some of whom subsequently died. The first reports were that some 200 lives had been lost.

The crew, except for the marines, were lascars from Goa. Thirty-six crew members were ashore and so survived. Captain d'Assis e Silva of Dona Maria II and 187 officers and crew were killed, as were three French prisoners and some 40 Chinese who were working on board or were in junks and sampans alongside. Nothing certain was known of the cause of the explosion. One story was that the explosion was a deliberate act of sabotage by the keeper of the powder magazine who held a grudge against the captain. After the loss of Dona Maria II and the death of da Cunha, the Portuguese abandoned any plans to retaliate against the Chinese for Amaral's assassination.
