= HMS Volage (1807) =

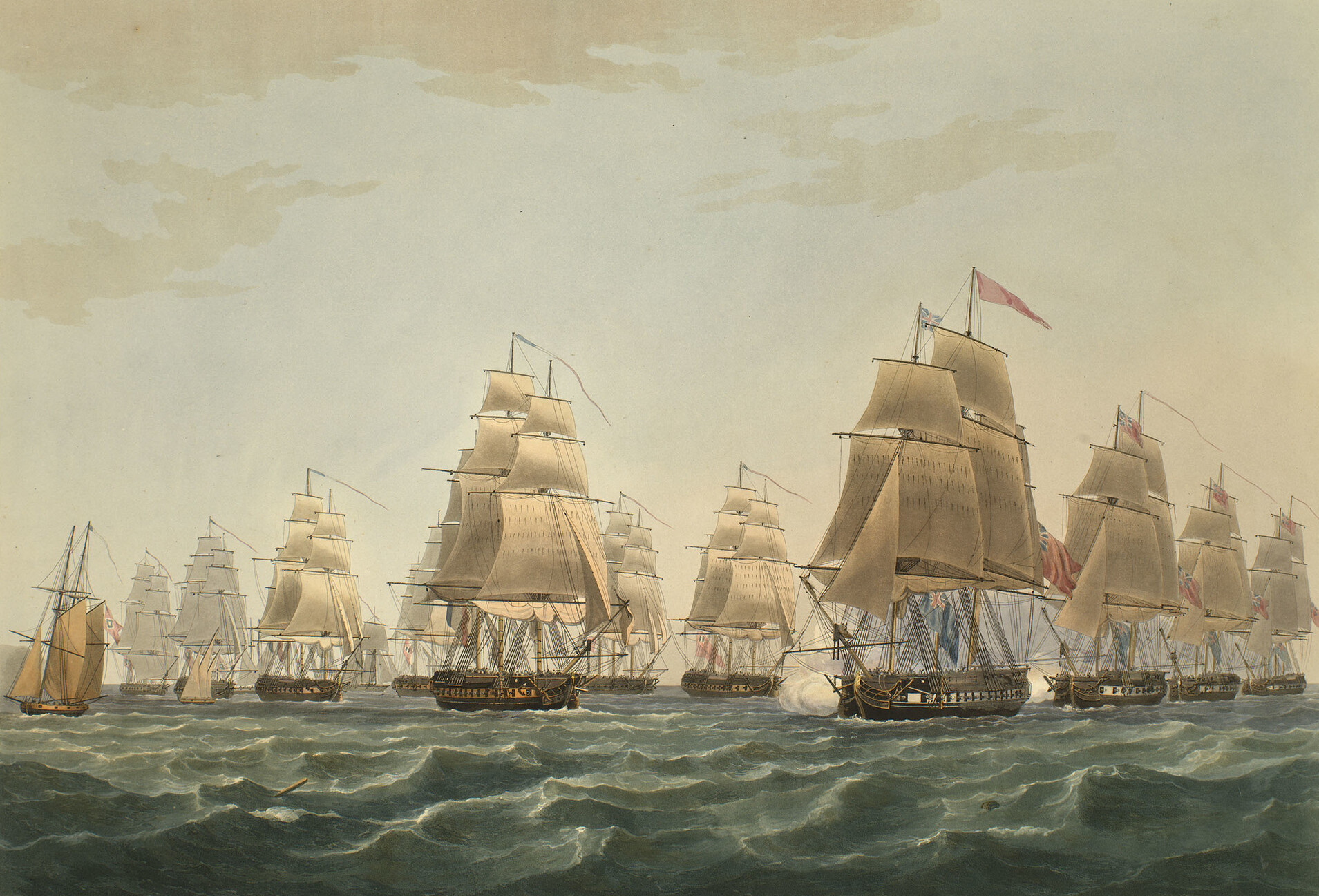
- Volage (first from right) at the Battle of Lissa in 1811

History

United Kingdom
- Name: HMS Volage
- Ordered: 30 January 1805
- Builder: Richard Chapman, Bideford
- Laid down: January 1806
- Launched: 23 March 1807
- Completed: 8 September 1807 at Plymouth Dockyard
- Commissioned: May 1807
- Honours and awards: Naval General Service Medal with clasp "Lissa"
- Fate: Sold on 29 January 1818

United Kingdom
- Name: Rochester
- Owner: Hills & Co.
- Acquired: 1818 by purchase
- Fate: Last mentioned in lists in 1831

General characteristics
- Class & type: 22-gun Laurel-class sixth-rate post ship
- Tons burthen: 52947/94, or 530, or 545 (bm)
- Length: 118 ft 2 1/2 in (36.0 m) (gundeck); 98 ft 9 in (30.1 m) (keel)
- Beam: 31 ft 9 in (9.7 m)
- Depth of hold: 10 ft 3 in (3.1 m)
- Sail plan: Full-rigged ship
- Complement: 155
- Armament: Upper deck: 22 × 32-pounder carronades; QD: 6 × 24-pounder carronades; Fc: 2 × 6-pounder guns + 2 × 24-pounder carronades

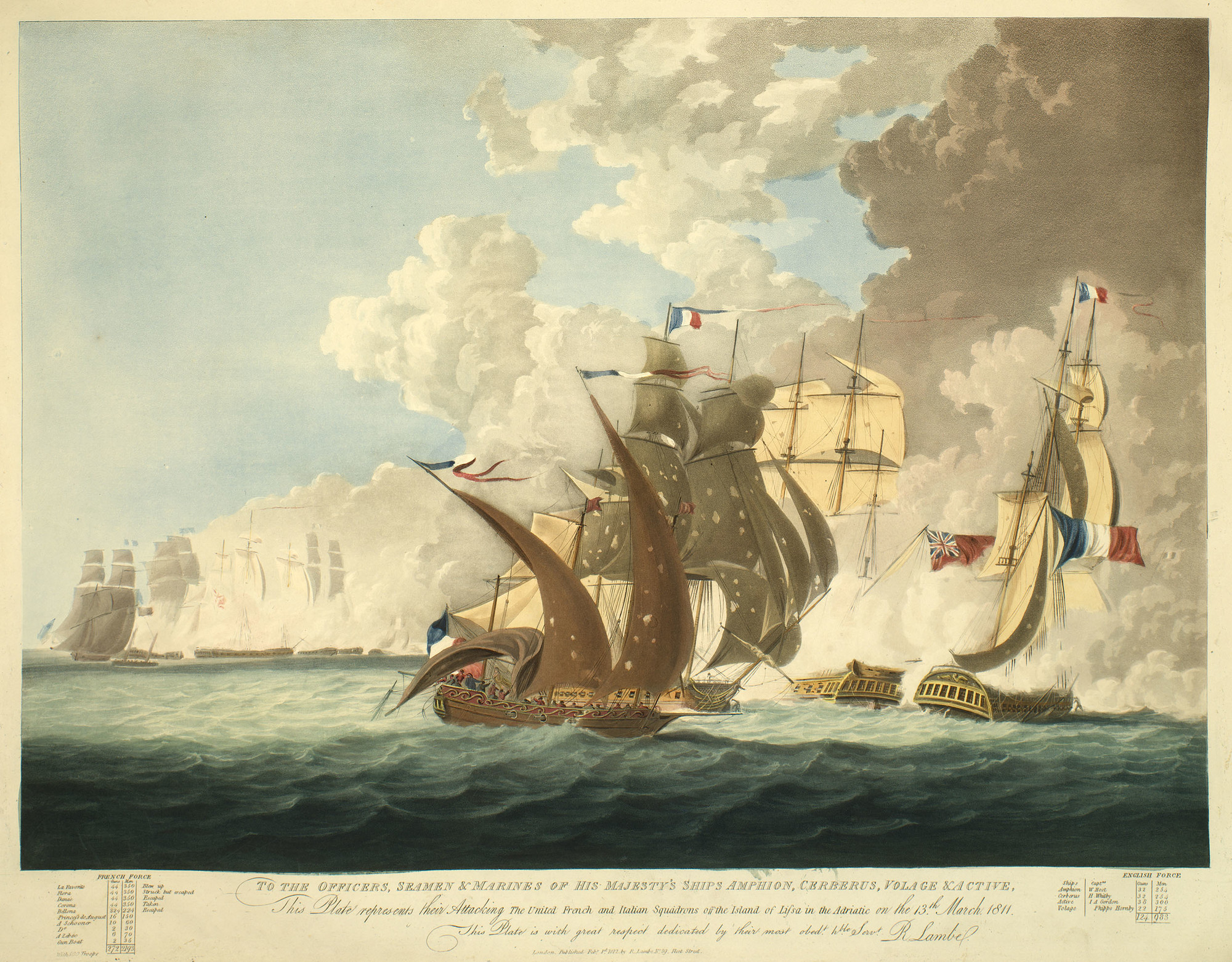
HMS Amphion, Cerberus, Volage, and Active attacking the Franco-Italian squadron at the Battle of Lissa on 13 March 1811

HMS Volage was a Laurel-class sixth-rate post-ship of the Royal Navy. She served during the Napoleonic War, capturing four privateers and participating in the Battle of Lissa (1811). She was sold in 1818. Her new owners renamed her Rochester and she served in a commercial capacity for another 12 years, first sailing between England and India, and then making two voyages to the South Seas as a whaler. She was last listed in Lloyd's List in 1831.

== Naval career ==
Volage was built by Richard Chapman, of Bideford, who launched her on 23 March 1807. She sailed to the Mediterranean in October 1807, soon after commissioning in May 1807 under Captain Philip Rosenhagen. On 6 November she was off Galita Island when she captured the French cutter Succès, of ten guns and 59 men, under the command of lieutenant de vaisseau Bourdé Villehuet. According to her captain, Succès had sailed from Toulon three days earlier on a cruise; Rosenhagen suspected that she was actually carrying despatches that Villehuet had had time to destroy. Rosenhagen also thought that Succès may have been in British service as the Sussex. (Note: French records report that Succès was a British cutter, possibly a privateer. She was taken at Algeciras in July 1801 and had a crew of 70 men. In 1805 she first carried one 12-pounder and three 3-pounder guns; later she carried twelve 4-pounder guns. There is no Admiralty record of a cutter, whether commissioned or a hired armed vessel, named Success or Sussex during the period 1793–1817. If she had been a cutter in "His Majesty's Service", she may have been a vessel acquired at Gibraltar and serving as a ship's tender. However, there is no record of a cutter by that name being lost while in His Majesty's service. There was a cutter named Success that received a letter of marque on 14 December 1801, but there is no evidence to link that cutter with Succès.)

The next year, on 28 July 1808, Volage captured the French brig Requin just north of Corsica after a chase of nine hours during which Requin threw her boats, boom, and anchors overboard. Requin was only 14 months old, armed with 16 guns, though pierced for 18, and had a crew of 108 men under the command of capitaine de fregate Bérard, a Member of the Legion of Honour. She had just left Ajaccio where she had delivered prizes that she had taken on her way from Algiers to Toulon. Rosenhagen took his prisoners into Malta before returning to his station. A French account reports that Requin endured two-and-a-half hours of fire, returning three broadsides, before surrendering to the English frigate Volage, of 40 guns.

Earlier, in May, Wizard had chased and engaged Requin for some 88 hours and 369 miles before having to give up the chase when Requin was able to gain the protection of the guns of Fort Goleta in the bay of Tunis. The British took Requin into service as HMS Sabine.

Almost a year later, Volage captured two more privateers. On 6 September 1809 she captured Annunciate, of two guns and 40 men. Then on 20 September, Volage captured Jason, of six guns and 69 men.

In June 1810, boats from Volage and Bustard, under the command of Captain John Duff Markland of Bustard, entered a port a few miles south of Cortone. There they destroyed 25 vessels carrying stores and provisions for Joachim Murat's army in Sicily.

In 1810 Captain Phipps Hornby took command and she served in the Adriatic, fighting at the Battle of Lissa and driving off a much larger French ship during the action. The action cost Volage 13 men killed and 33 wounded. Volage was badly cut-up in the battle. On 2 June she sailed from Malta for England in company with Amphion and the prizes from the battle. She carried with her Lord Byron as a passenger.

In 1847 the Admiralty awarded all surviving claimants from the action the Naval General Service Medal with clasp "Lissa".

Following this victory, Volage came briefly under the command of Arthur Bingham in February 1812, or so. She then was sent to the East Indies under Captain Donald Hugh Mackay. She was carrying Sir Evan Nepean, who was taking up his post as governor in Bombay, and escorting three cartel ships. On the way she arrived at the Cape of Good Hope on 24 June. She then served under the orders of Sir Samuel Hood in the Eastern Archipelago and the China seas. In June 1813, Volage was under the command of Captain Samuel Leslie when her sailors took part in the capture of the pirate settlement at Sambas, in Borneo. There they helped capture five batteries, one after another, in half an hour. In September Volage participated in the operations in support of the restoration of the Sultan of Palembang. Leslie left Volage on 1 January 1814. Then for while she came under the command of her first lieutenant (acting captain) John Allen.

In March Volage next came under the command of Captain Joseph Drury, followed by Captain Charles Biddulph in April. However he died in April 1815. In February 1816 she came under the command of Captain Johnathan Bartholomew Hoar Curran, who sailed her back to Britain.

Disposal: Volage was sold on 29 January 1818 for £1,600 to a Mr. Lackland for mercantile use. She then assumed the name Rochester.

== Mercantile career ==
Rochester first appears in Lloyd's Register (LR) in 1818, but much of the entry is illegible. The 1819 issue showed Rochester, "Bdefrd"-built, 10 years old, and 530 tons (bm). The data in the tables below comes from both LR and the Register of Shipping (RS). The discrepancies between these sources comes from the facts that they published at different points in the year, and that they were only as accurate as owners chose to keep them. The lack of attention to keeping the registers updated means the information in the registers is often not consistent with other data sources.

In 1813 the EIC had lost its monopoly on the trade between India and Britain. British ships were then free to sail to India or the Indian Ocean under a license from the EIC. A list of licensed ships showed Rochester, D. Sutton, master, sailing from England on 14 April 1818, bound for Bengal.

| Year | Master | Owner | Trade | Notes |
|---|---|---|---|---|
| 1818 | D. Sutton | | | LR; Data other than tonnage is illegible |
| 1819 | D. Sutton | Hills & Co. | London & India | LR; almost rebuilt in 1818 |
| 1824 | D. Sutton; E. Worth | Hills & Co. | London–India; South Seas | LR; almost rebuilt 1818 |

Hills & Co., or A. Hill next deployed Rochester to the Southern Whale Fishery. She made two voyages as a whaler.

Captain Charles B. Worth sailed from London on 8 February 1823, bound for Peru. The voyage was eventful in that she visited Tonga, Bay of Islands, Rotuma, the waters off Japan, the coast of California, and Honolulu. Eight men deserted at Rotuma, and she lost two boats and five men off California. During the voyage captain Worth died of an infection after his knee came into contact with the sharp edge of a barb on a harpoon. Captain Clunie returned to England on 1 February 1827 with more than 1800 barrels of whale oil.

Captain Folger sailed from England on 17 November 1827, bound for the Seychelles. Rochester was a reported to have been at Honolulu in January 1829. Captain Smith returned to England on 19 September 1830 with 780 casks (330 tuns) of whale oil. This was reported at the time to have been the largest cargo of whale oil ever landed by an English whaler.

| Year | Master | Owner | Trade | Source & notes |
|---|---|---|---|---|
| 1824 | Watt | A. Hill | London–Southern fishery | RS |
| 1825 | C. North | Hills & Co. | London & South Seas | LR |
| 1831 | C. North | Hills & Co. | London & South Seas | LR |
| 1831 | Watt | A. Hill | London & South Seas | RS |
| 1832 | | | | No entry |
