= HMS Hussar (1807) =

Lively-class frigate of the Royal Navy

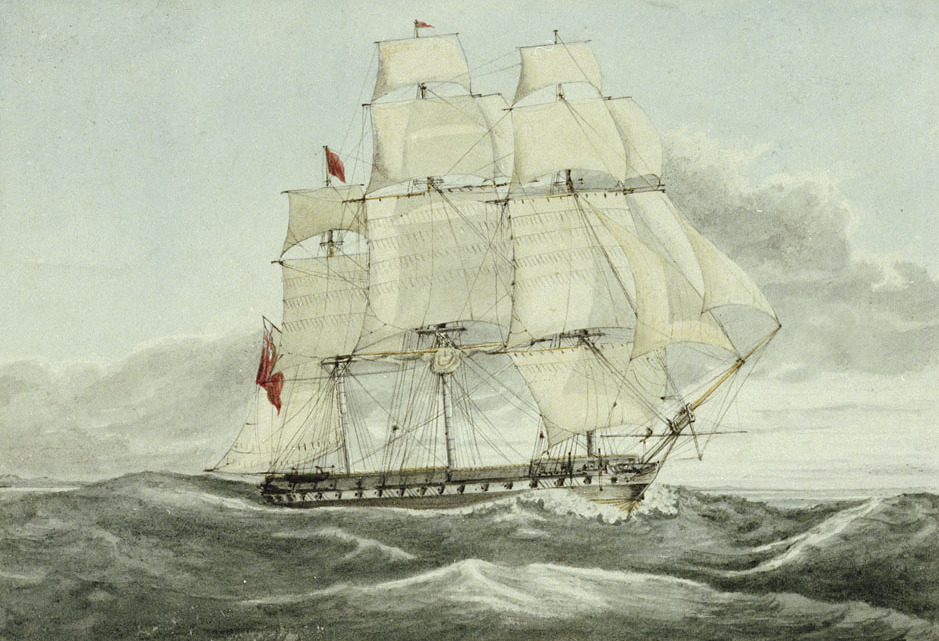
Illustration of Hussar

HMS Hussar was a 38-gun Lively-class fifth-rate frigate of the Royal Navy launched in 1807 from Buckler's Hard. She was later re-rated to 46 guns.

== History ==
She was part of a class designed by William Rule in 1799, and was built by Balthazar Adams at Buckler's Hard, launched on 23 April 1807 for £18,199. Buckler's Hard was not equipped to arm the vessel or to equip her to Royal Navy standards and she spent a further two months at Portsmouth Dockyard being equipped at a further cost of £16,127.

She was launched under the command of Captain Robert Lloyd with a crew of 285 men who took her to the Leeward Islands in the West Indies. In April 1809 command transferred to Captain Alexander Skene who escorted a convoy from Jamaica to Britain before being reassigned to the Baltic Sea on patrol duties in 1810.

In December 1810 command passed to Captain James Coutts Crawford who sailed her to the East Indies in February 1811 where she was part of the invasion of Java. She later took part in a punitive expedition against the Sultanate of Sambas in West Borneo in June 1813.

In 1813 command passed to Captain George Elliot who returned her to Britain for upgrade and repair at first Deptford Dockyard then Chatham Dockyard. The pressure of completion sharply declined after the end of the Napoleonic Wars and only in 1823 was she repurposed, being re-equipped to serve at the Jamaica Station but she was not relaunched until 1827, under the command of Captain Edward Boxer and as flag-ship to the fleet of Sir Charles Ogle based at the quiet station in Halifax, Nova Scotia.

She was paid off in 1830 and returned to Britain to act as a "receiving ship", an office type function with all armaments removed, within Chatham Dockyard which function she continued until 1861 when she was used for target practice. She was destroyed by fire as the result of such target practice at Shoeburyness in July 1861.
