= Princess Charlotte of Wales (ship) =

East Indiaman (1812–1821)

History

United Kingdom
- Name: Jane Duchess of Gordon
- Owner: Voyage 1 & 2: Charles Christie; Voyage 3: Milliken Craig; Voyages 4-9: Charles Besly Gribble
- Operator: British East India Company
- Builder: Dudman, Deptford
- Laid down: 15 December 1810
- Launched: 30 January 1812
- Renamed: Princess Charlotte of Wales while on the stocks
- Fate: Sold 1831

General characteristics
- Type: East Indiaman
- Tons burthen: 978, 97888/94 or 1016 (bm) (bm);
- Length: 150 ft 4 3/4 in (45.8 m) (overall); 121 ft 5 in (37.0 m) (keel)
- Beam: 39 ft (11.9 m)
- Depth of hold: 15 ft (4.6 m)
- Sail plan: Full-rigged ship
- Complement: 110 men
- Armament: 22 × 18-pounder guns; 10 × 18-pounder carronades

Princess Charlotte of Wales was an East Indiaman launched in 1812, and named for Princess Charlotte of Wales. She made nine voyages to Madras and Bengal for the British East India Company (EIC) before she was broken up in 1831.

== Voyages ==
On her first two voyages, which took place during the Napoleonic Wars, her captain chose to sail under a letter of marque dated 4 April 1812.

=== Voyage #1 (1812-14) ===
Princess Charlotte of Wales, under the command of Captain John Craig, left Falmouth on 15 May 1812, bound for Ceylon and Bengal. She reached Madeira on 3 June, Colombo on 2 October, and Saugor on 22 December. From there she sailed to Malacca, where she arrived on 1 April 1813, Batavia on 28 April, and Samarang on 24 May. In June 1813, she transported troops for a punitive expedition to the Sultanate of Sambas. She then left Malacca on 28 July, and Penang on 10 August. She left Saugor on 24 September, Calcutta on 26 October, and Saugor again on 4 December. On 10 January 1814, she arrived at Madras and on 4 February, Point de Galle. By 10 April, she had reached St Helena. She arrived at The Downs on 6 August.

=== Voyage #2 (1815-16) ===
Captain John Craig was again her captain when she left The Downs on 3 April 1815. A few days before she left a violent gale carried away two anchors and cables. On 27 July, she reached Madras, and on 19 August, Diamond Harbour. For the return trip she passed Saugor on 11 November. In December, she loaded the 59th Regiment of Foot and conveyed them to Madras. At Madras she grounded on the Pulicat shoal and her crew had to throw some of her cargo overboard to lighten her. She reached Madras on 25 December, Bombay on 1 February 1816, Madras again on 5 April, and St Helena on 20 July. She arrived at The Downs on 12 September.

=== Voyage #3 (1817-18) ===
Captain Charles Besly Gribble sailed Princess Charlotte of Wales on her third trip, leaving The Downs on 14 March 1817, and reaching Madras on 9 July, and the Hugli river 9 August. For the return trip she passed the Eastern Channel (of the Hugli) on 25 December, reaching Madras on 4 January 1818, Colombo on 27 January, and St Helena on 31 March. She arrived at The Downs on 3 June.

=== Voyage #4 (1819-20) ===
Captain Gribble left The Downs on 23 May 1819, and reached the New Anchorage (Saugor) on 4 September. On the return trip, Princess Charlotte of Wales reached Madras on 4 January 1820, Colombo on 1 February, and St Helena on 29 March. She arrived at The Downs on 25 May.

=== Voyage #5 (1821-22) ===
Captain Christopher Biden left the Downs on 7 July 1821, and reached New Anchorage on 4 November. The return trip passed Saugor on 22 February 1822, and reached St Helena on 29 April. Princess Charlotte of Wales arrived at The Downs on 30 June.

=== Voyage #6 (1823-24) ===
Captain Charles Besly Gribble again commanded Princess Charlotte of Wales, leaving Plymouth on 28 May 1823. She reached Madras on 3 September, and New Anchorage on 3 October. The return trip reached Madras on 28 December, and St Helena on 1 March 1824. On 23 April, she arrived at The Downs.

=== Voyage #7 (1825-26) ===
Captain Christopher Biden sailed from Plymouth on 25 April 1825, and left Trincomalee on 10 August. He arrived at Madras four days later, and Diamond Harbour on 12 September. The return trip left Saugor on 22 December, reached St Helena on 1 April 1826, and Ascension ten days later. Princess Charlotte of Wales arrived at The Downs on 29 May.

=== Voyage #8 (1827-1828) ===
Captain Biden left Portsmouth on 3 June 1827, and reached Diamond Harbour on 31 October. The return trip left Saugor on 30 December, reaching Madras on 11 February 1828, and St Helena on 14 April. Princess Charlotte of Wales arrived at The Downs on 6 June.

=== Voyage #9 (1829-30) ===
Princess Charlotte of Wales left the Downs on 8 June 1829, under the command of Captain Christopher Biden. She reached Kedgeree on 22 September. She left Saugor, homeward bound, on 6 February 1830, and reached St Helena on 10 June. She arrived at The Downs on 2 August.

== Fate ==
Gribble sold Princess Charlotte of Wales to J. Childers on 20 Apr 1831, for £3000. She was broken up immediately thereafter.
