= Sultanate of Sambas =

Malay state in western Borneo, 1609–1956

Sambas Sultanate كسلطانن سمبس Kesultanan Melayu Sambas
- 1609–1956
- Flag

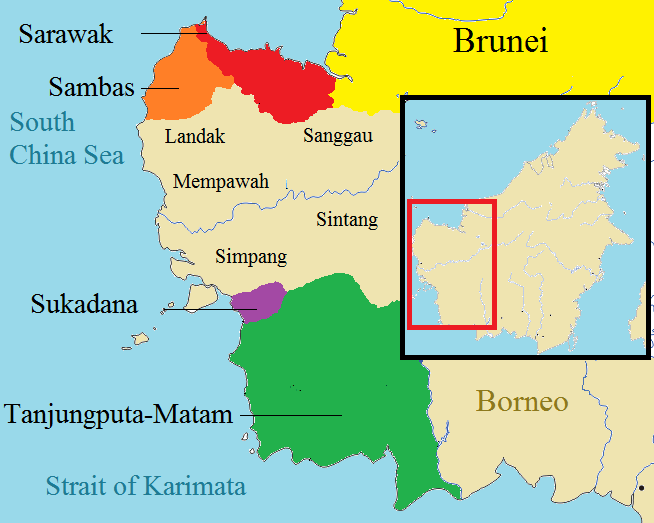
- Capital: Sambas
- Common languages: Classical Sambas Malay
- Other languages: Sanskrit (until 1675); Arabic
- Religion: Hinduism (until 1675); Sunni Islam
- Demonym: Sambas
- Government: Monarchy
- Sultans
  - 1675–1685: Muhammad Shafi ud-din I (First Sultan)
  - 1846–1854: Abu Bakr Tajuddin II (Last Sultan)
- History
  - Established: 1609
  - Arrival of Sultan Tengah: 1639
  - Sambas expeditions: 1812-1813
  - Sarawak Uprising of 1836: 1836 – December 1840
  - Exile of Abu Bakar Tajuddin II: 1956
Preceded by	Succeeded by
Sultanate of Sarawak; Bruneian Empire	Dutch East Indies
- Today part of: Indonesia

The Sultanate of Sambas (Malay: كسلطانن سمبس, romanized: Kesultanan Sambas) was a traditional Malay state on the Western coast of the island of Borneo, in modern-day Indonesia.

== History ==
At first governed by governors, Sambas became a kingdom in 1609 with the descendant of Sepudak. She married one of her daughters to a prince of Sultan Muhammad Hassan of Brunei, Prince Tengah whom later became the first and the last Sultan of Sarawak for Bruneian Empire. The child of this union, Muhammad Saif ud-din I became the first Muslim Sultan of Sambas.

During the colonial period, Sambas remained largely independent and became a center of pirate activity in the early nineteenth century. In 1812 and 1813, the British launched two military expeditions against Sambas, the first one failing and the second one managing to capture Sambas. The Dutch took control in 1819, leading into frequent minglings into succession, deposing and exiling Abu Bakar Tajuddin II to Java.

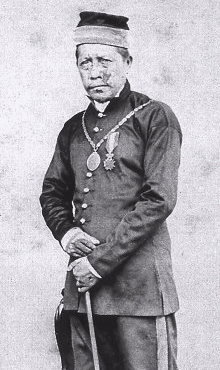
Umar Akam ud-din III, the Sultan of Sambas (1854-1866)

== Territories ==
The territories of the Sambas Sultanate at the beginning, when it was first established by Raden Sulaiman (Sultan Muhammad Shafiuddin I), included the Sambas River and its tributaries, as well as the Paloh River and its tributaries. During the reign of the 2nd Sultan of Sambas, Sultan Muhammad Tajuddin I (Raden Bima), the boundaries of the Sambas Sultanate expanded to include the Sambas River and the Selakau River and its tributaries. The territory of the Sambas Sultanate then continued to expand until during the reign of the 4th Sultan of Sambas (Sultan Abubakar Kamaluddin), the territory of the Sambas Sultanate encompassed Tanjung Datuk in the north to the Duri River in the south, then the Montraduk and Bengkayang areas in the southeast, and the Seluas and Sungkung areas in the east. The territory of the Sambas Sultanate from the time of the 4th Sultan of Sambas (Sultan Abubakar Kamaluddin) then continued to survive until the end of the Sambas Sultanate's reign for about 279 years (through 15 Sultans and 2 Heads of Government) namely by joining the Republic of the United States of Indonesia (RIS) in 1950. In 1956, the former territory of the Sambas Sultanate (namely the territory of the Sambas Sultanate since the 4th Sultan of Sambas until the end of the Sambas Sultanate's reign) was completely made into the Sambas Regency (as stated in the West Kalimantan Regional News regarding the formation of Sambas Regency in 1956). The Sambas Regency area then continued to survive until then in 2000, the Sambas Regency area was expanded into 3 Government Areas namely Sambas Regency, Singkawang City, and Bengkayang Regency until now.

== List of rulers ==
Panembahan Ratu (King) of Sambas:

- Timbang Paseban (1600–1609)
- Sepudak (1609–1632)
- Anom Kesumayuda (1632–1670)

Sultanate of Sambas:

- Muhammad Shafi ud-din I (1675–1685)
- Muhammad Taj ud-din I (1685–1708)
- Umar Aqam ud-din I (1708–1732)
- Abu Bakar Kamal ud-din I (1732–1764)
- Umar Akam ud-din II (1764–1786)
- Achmad Taj ud-din II (1786–1793)
- Abu Bakar Taj ud-din I (1793–1815)
- Muhammad 'Ali Shafi ud-din I (1815–1828)
- Usman Kamal ud-din (1828–1832)
- Umar Akam ud-din III (1832–1846)
- Abu Bakar Taj ud-din II (1846–1854)
- Umar Kamal ud-din (1854–1866)
- Muhammad Shafi ud-din II (1866–1924)
- Muhammad 'Ali Shafi ud-din II (1924–1926)
- Muhammad Tayeb (Chief of Dewan Majelis Kesultanan Sambas 1926 - 1931)
- Muhammad Ibrahim Shafi ud-din (1931–1943)
- Muchsin Panji Anom (Chief of Dewan Majelis Kesultanan Sambas 1946 - 1950)
- Muhammad Taufik (Head of the Royal Family 1950 - 1984)
- Winata Kusuma (Head of the Royal Family 1984 - 2000, Sultan 2000 - 2008, died 1 February 2008)
- Muhammad Tarhan (Head of the Royal Family since 3 February 2008)

== Family tree ==
Family tree of Sambas Monarchs

Muhammad; Shafiuddin I^{(1)} r. 1671-1682
Muhammad; Tajuddin^{(2)} r. 1682-1718
Umar; Aqamaddin I^{(3)} r. 1718-1732
Abubakr; Kamaluddin^{(4)} r. 1732-1762
Umar; Aqamaddin II^{(5)} r. 1762-1786, 1793-1802
Achmad; Tajuddin I^{(6)} r. 1786-1793	Abubakr; Tajuddin I^{(7)} r. 1802-1815	Muhammad Ali; Shafiuddin I^{(8)} r. 1815-1828	Usman; Kamaluddin I^{(9)} r. 1828-1832	Umar; Aqamaddin III^{(10)} r. 1832-1846
Abubakr; Tajuddin II^{(11)} r. 1846-1854	Umar; Kamaluddin II^{(12)} r. 1854-1866
Muhammad; Shafiuddin II^{(13)} r. 1866-1924
Muhammad Ali; Shafiuddin II^{(14)} r. 1924-1926	Pangeran; Achmad Tajuddin II
Muhammad; Ibrahim; Shafiuddin^{(15)} r. 1931-1944
Head of the Royal Family
Muhammad; Taufik^{(16)} r. 1944-1984
Winata; Kusuma^{(17)} r. 1984-2008
Muhammad; Tarhan^{(18)} r. 2008-present
