= HMS Hesper (1809) =

Sloop of the Royal Navy

History

United Kingdom
- Name: HMS Hesper
- Ordered: 19 October 1805
- Builder: Benjamin Tanner, later John Cock, Dartmouth
- Laid down: June 1806
- Launched: 3 July 1809
- Completed: 30 September 1809 at Plymouth Dockyard
- Commissioned: August 1809
- Out of service: Sold 8 July 1817
- Honours and awards: Naval General Service Medal with clasp "Java"

General characteristics
- Class & type: 18-gun Cormorant-class sloop
- Tons burthen: 4241/94 bm
- Length: 108 ft 3 3/4 in (33.0 m) (overall); 90 ft 9 7/8 in (27.7 m) (keel)
- Beam: 29 ft 8 in (9.0 m)
- Depth of hold: 9 ft (2.74 m)
- Propulsion: Sails
- Sail plan: Sloop
- Complement: 121
- Armament: Upper deck: 16 × 32-pounder carronades; QD: 6 × 18-pounder carronades; Fc: 2 × 6-pounder guns + 2 × 18-pounder carronades

HMS Hesper was a British Royal Navy 18-gun ship-sloop of the Cormorant class, launched in 1809 at Dartmouth. Her original builder, Benjamin Tanner, became bankrupt during her construction, so John Cock completed her. In 1810 she was reclassed as a 20-gun sixth-rate ship (but without being re-armed); in 1817 she was again re-rated, this time as 26 guns. She served primarily in the Indian Ocean. In 1810 she participated in the Invasion of Isle de France. The next year Hesper participated in the capture of Java, which she followed in 1812 by capturing Timor. She was sold in 1817.

== Service ==
G. Aklom commissioned Hesper in March 1807. However, Hesper was not launched until 1809 and did not enter service until 1809. Captain George Hoare was appointed to Hesper in 1809, commissioned her in August and sailed for the Indian Ocean on 9 October. (Note: The National Maritime Museum database has Edward Wallis Hoare commissioning Hesper and W. Buchanan sailing her to the East Indies, but that information applies to Hecate and also appears on her record.) In October 1810 Commander David Paterson took command.

Hesper captured Mouche No. 28 on 15 November 1810 near Île Bonaparte (Réunion) as she was carrying dispatches to the Île de France. A boarding party in Hesper's cutter suffered three men wounded while boarding Mouche; French casualties were two men killed and five wounded, one of whom was Mouche No. 28's commander. The British recommissioned her for the attack on Île de France.

Hesper was detailed for service with the squadron under Admiral Albemarle Bertie engaged in the invasion of Isle de France (Mauritius). Bertie set Hesper and Cornelia to join the group blockading Port Louis. While she was there, she and the government armed ship Emma, Lieutenant B. Street commanding, performed a useful reconnaissance taking soundings at night of the anchorage on the coast, a service for which Bertie commended them. They identified a place in a narrow strait between an islet called the Gunner's Coin and the beach where the fleet could anchor and where boats could land through an opening in the reef. The island surrendered on 3 December. In September 1814 prize money was paid to the officers and crews of the vessels that had been present at the capture of Isle de France. (Note: A first-class share was worth £278 19s 5 3/4d; a sixth-class share, that of an ordinary seaman, was worth £3 7s 6 1/4d. A fourth and final payment was made in July 1828. A first-class share was worth £29 19s 5 1/4d; a sixth-class share was worth 8s 2 1/2d.)

Following the successful invasion, Hesper was at the centre of a dispute between Admiral Bertie and Admiral William O'Bryen Drury whose commands overlapped. Bertie appointed Lieutenant Edward Lloyd to command Hesper and he sailed her back to Bombay with Major-General John Abercrombie and his staff as passengers. There Lloyd found out that Drury had appointed Barrington Reynolds to command her. Although Drury died before the dispute was settled, Reynolds was confirmed in command.

On 5 January 1811, Hesper was one of six ships that shared in the capture of Mouche. French records report that Mouche No. 27 was captured on 12 January at the entrance to Port Napoléon (Port Louis, Île de France) by a British frigate flying the French flag.

Later in 1811, Hesper was attached to the squadron of Admiral Robert Stopford that captured Java.

On 31 August the frigates Nisus, President, and Phoebe, and Hesper were detached to take the seaport of Cheribon. Reynolds received a promotion to Post-captain, confirmed the next year, for his role. In 1847 the Admiralty authorized the issuance of the Naval General Service Medal with clasp "Java" to all remaining survivors of the campaign.

In February 1812 command passed to Charles Thomas Thurston, who was blown by a storm to Timor, which had been out on contact with Europe for two years. Thurston was able to persuade the Dutch garrison there to surrender and captured the island without fighting. Thurston was later invalided home. Lieutenant Henry Theodosius Browne Collier took command on 30 June 1812, but he too was invalided home before the confirmation of his promotion to commander on 24 October 1812. Command then passed to Commander Joseph Prior. As a lieutenant, he had transferred to Hesper in 1809.

William Bland was Hesper's surgeon while she was at Bombay, India. He became involved in a wardroom argument with Robert Case, the ship's purser, which resulted in a duel with pistols on 7 April 1813 in which Bland killed Case. He was convicted of Case's murder and sentenced to be transported to Australia.

In October Hesper was in the Persian Gulf, delivering despatches to Bushire for the British ambassador at Teheran. She then visited Abu Dhabi. Captain Charles Biddulph replaced Prior in August 1812 and served until 22 April 1815, when he died. Before he died 22 May 1815, aged 29, he charted the four Biddulph's Islands (or Biddulph Group), which lie on the Arabian side of the Persian Gulf. (Note: The four islands consist of sand banks and rocks barely elevated above sea level and are home to birds and turtles.)

Hesper was without a captain for a while and then on 20 September 1815 Michael Matthews was made commander on Hesper. Commander Robert Campbell (acting) was his replacement. (Note: Captain Robert Campbell was also the "dear cousin" to the poet Thomas Campbell.) In 1816 Commander William Everard (acting) replaced Campbell.

== Fate ==
Hesper was sold in 1817.
