= HMS Jaseur (1807) =

Brig of the Royal Navy

History

France
- Name: Jaseur
- Namesake: Redwing
- Acquired: Purchased July 1806
- Captured: 10 July 1807

United Kingdom
- Name: HMS Jaseur
- Acquired: July 1807 by capture
- Fate: Disappeared August 1808

General characteristics
- Type: Ship-sloop
- Propulsion: Sails
- Sail plan: Brig
- Armament: 12 guns

HMS Jaseur was originally the French Navy brig Jaseur that the Royal Navy captured in 1807 and took into service under the same name. She participated in one campaign and was lost in August 1808.

== French service ==
The French Navy purchased the mercantile brig Jaseur at Île de France in July 1806. On 10 July 1807, the British fifth rate HMS Bombay, under Captain William Jones Lye, captured Jaseur in the Bay of Bengal some eight leagues (21 nmi; 24 mi; 39 km) off Little Andaman, after a chase of nine hours. Jaseur was armed with 12 guns and had a crew of 55 men under the command of a lieutenant de vaisseau. She had left Île de France on 15 April 1807 and had made no captures.

== British service ==
Jaseur was bought into the Royal Navy for £1,794. A survey by a committee of impartial builders and carpenters established the price. The British commissioned her as HMS Jaseur under Lieutenant Thomas Laugharne in December 1807 at Java.

On 20 November 1807 Jaseur sailed in a squadron under the command of Rear-Admiral Sir Edward Pellew from Malacca to the Dutch post at Griessie in the Netherlands East Indies. They arrived on 5 December 1807. When the Dutch commandant refused to surrender the vessels there, all of which were on shore, dismantled and without their guns, the British squadron turned its guns on a battery of twelve 9- and 18-pounder guns at Sambelangan on Madura Island. The governor and council of Surabaya, a settlement about 15 miles (24 km) higher up the river, and to which Gressie was subordinate, signed a treaty. On 11 December 1807 the British set fire to the ships at Gressie, which the Dutch had already scuttled, and destroyed the guns and military stores in the garrison of Gressie, and at the battery of Sambelangan.

== Fate ==
In company with a local merchant brig heading to Macao, Jaseur left Calcutta in Bengal on 8 August 1808 bound for Prince of Wales Island with dispatches for Rear-Admiral William O'Bryen Drury. The two ships encountered a violent gale that month and became separated. Jaseur was never heard from again. She was presumed to have foundered with the loss of all hands.
