= Narcissus-class frigate =

Frigate class of the Royal Navy

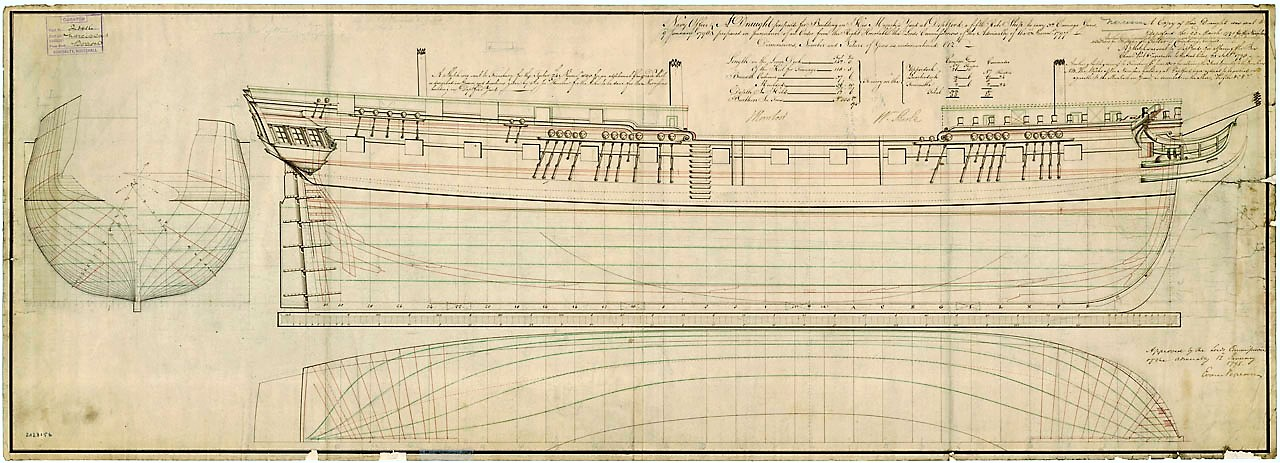
- Plan of the Narcissus-class frigates

Class overview
- Name: Narcissus-class frigate
- Operators: Royal Navy
- Preceded by: Amphion class
- Succeeded by: Apollo class
- Built: 1800–1808
- In service: 1801–1837
- Planned: 5
- Completed: 3
- Canceled: 2
- Lost: 1

General characteristics
- Type: Fifth-rate frigate
- Tons burthen: 885 90/94 (bm)
- Length: 142 ft 0 1/2 in (43.3 m) (gundeck); 118 ft 5 in (36.1 m) (keel)
- Beam: 37 ft 8 in (11.5 m)
- Depth of hold: 12 ft 6 in (3.8 m)
- Propulsion: Sails
- Complement: 254
- Armament: Gundeck: 26 × 18-pounder guns; QD: 2 × 9-pounder guns + 8 × 24-pounder carronades; Fc: 2 × 9-pounder guns + 2 × 24-pounder carronades

The Narcissus-class frigate was a 32-gun, 18-pounder fifth-rate frigate class of five ships of the Royal Navy. Designed by Surveyor of the Navy Sir John Henslow, the class was created to make use of shipyards that could not construct larger frigates. They were similar in design to the preceding 32-gun frigate class, the Amphion class, but were slightly shorter. Two ships were initially constructed, with a later batch of three being ordered in response to an Admiralty request for the resumption of production of proven frigate designs. The final two ships of the class were cancelled when the shipyard they were being constructed at went bankrupt. Unlike her sister ships, the name ship of the class Narcissus was armed with experimental short 24 pounders rather than 18 pounders.

The ships of the class were not especially fast, slower than the Amphion class, but were well-liked because of their easy sailing qualities and manoeuvrability. The three completed vessels all saw service during the period of the Napoleonic Wars, with key actions including Narcissus at the Battle of Blaauwberg in 1806 and cutting out USRC Surveyor in 1813, Tartar at the Battle of Alvøen in 1808, and Cornelia at the invasions of Isle de France and Java in 1810–1811. Of the three, Narcissus survived until 1837 serving as a hospital ship, while Tartar was wrecked in 1811 and Cornelia broken up in 1814.

== Design ==
The Narcissus class of 32-gun fifth-rate frigates was designed by the Surveyor of the Navy Sir John Henslow and approved by the Admiralty on 13 January 1798. By this time the 32-gun frigate had been overtaken in popularity by larger and stronger 36- and 38-gun frigates. 32-gun frigates were however still designed and built in certain situations, and Henslow created the Narcissus class in response to a need to use up smaller timbers available at Deptford Dockyard. The particular slipway earmarked for this first ship fed into a basin with an entrance that was too narrow for large frigates to sail through, necessitating that the design be for a smaller 32-gun frigate.

The Admiralty preferred to construct these slightly inferior ships rather than leave shipyard capacity unfilled. Henslow based the class on the Amphion class, another 32-gun frigate design that had been created by the other Surveyor of the Navy, William Rule, for a shipyard on the River Stour that was too shallow for larger vessels. The Narcissus class was similar, but slightly shorter and such would prove to be the slower of the two classes.

== Construction and armament ==
The first ship of the class, HMS Narcissus, is recorded by naval historian Rif Winfield as being ordered on 23 November 1797, before the approval, but Robert Gardiner dates the order to the day of the design approval. A second vessel, HMS Tartar, was ordered on 28 January 1800 just as Narcissus was being laid down. With both these vessels in service from July 1801, a break ensued in construction. Three further ships were ordered in 1805 and 1806 when the Admiralty requested that the Navy Board submit proven frigate designs for further construction, of which the Narcissus class was one of three chosen. Of these new ships only the first (HMS Cornelia) was completed, as the final two ships of the class were cancelled on 24 June 1806, when the shipyard they were being constructed at went bankrupt.

All ships of the class were constructed to the following dimensions: 142 feet 1/2 inch (43.3 m) along the gun deck, 118 feet 5 inches (36.1 m) at the keel, with a beam of 37 feet 8 inches (11.5 m) and a depth in the hold of 12 feet 6 inches (3.8 m). They were to measure 885 90/94 tons burthen, with a crew of 254 men. This made them, along with the Amphion class, the largest ships of their type. On the gun deck the frigates were armed with twenty-six 18-pounder and two 9-pounder guns. Henslow's original design called for four 6-pounders and six 24-pounder carronades to be placed on the quarterdeck, with a further two 6-pounders and two 24-pounder carronades on the forecastle. An Admiralty Order on 20 June 1801 changed this, with the new supplementary armament being two 9-pounders and eight 24-pounder carronades on the quarterdeck, and two each of 9-pounders and 24-pounder carronades on the forecastle. The class would in later years be recorded as 38-gun frigates.

Narcissus's armament was expected to differ from her sister ships. Soon after her launch she was selected to test a new type of short 24-pounder (Note: Created as a middle ground between regular long guns and carronades, the design would eventually be accepted and used on the upper decks of some ships of the line.) in place of her 18-pounders, but it was found that the gun ports were too small to allow the 24-pounders to elevate properly on their unique gun carriage. They were ordered to be replaced by the original armament on 24 July 1801, before Narcissus began cruising with the experimental guns. However, with the Peace of Amiens ending the French Revolutionary Wars in March 1802, it was not considered important to quickly make the change, and eventually Narcissus was instead fully adapted to fit the 24-pounders. Narcissus was the only ship of the class to serve with an armament different to that laid out in the 20 June 1801 Admiralty Order.

The Narcissus-class frigates were never among the fastest ships of their type in the Royal Navy, but were still generally well-regarded at sea. They were recorded as being both weatherly and manoeuvrable. Sailing reports based on Narcissus's performances on 14 January and 12 March 1812 recorded the ship as capable of reaching between 9 knots (17 km/h) and 12 knots (22 km/h) depending on conditions, which was deemed above average, and noted that at sea the ship was especially comfortable to sail. While no sailing reports survive for the later vessels of the class, they probably performed very similarly.

== Ships ==
Ship name	Builder	Ordered	Laid down	Launched	Commissioned	Cost (Note: Cost includes initial construction and fittings when first commissioned.)	Fate	Ref.
Narcissus	Edward Tippett, Deptford Dockyard	23 November 1797	February 1800	12 May 1801	January 1801	£34,013	Sold January 1837	
Tartar	Josiah & Thomas Brindley, Frindsbury	28 January 1800	August 1800	27 June 1801	July 1801	Unknown	Wrecked 21 August 1811	
Cornelia	Simon Temple, South Shields	10 June 1805	May 1806	26 July 1808	November 1808	Unknown	Broken up June 1814	
Siren	William Record, Appledore	16 July 1805	1805?	—			Cancelled 24 June 1806	
Doris	William Record, Appledore	6 January 1806	—				Cancelled 24 June 1806	

=== Narcissus ===
Narcissus, named after the mytholical Greek beauty Narcissus, was commissioned by Captain Percy Fraser in January 1801. In October Fraser was replaced by Captain Ross Donnelly, under whom the ship sailed to the Mediterranean Sea in February 1802. For the majority of the year she participated in the blockade of Toulon. On 8 July 1803 Narcissus captured the French 16-gun brig Alcion off Sardinia, and continued to serve off Toulon. Then on 11 April 1804 her boats combined with those of HMS Seahorse and HMS Maidstone to destroy a convoy in Hyères Bay. Narcissus joined the Cape of Good Hope Station in April 1805, capturing the French 4-gun privateer Prudent on 29 October, and destroying the French 32-gun privateer Napoleon on 24 December. The ship was then present at the Battle of Blaauwberg in January 1806, and served at the invasion of the River Plate from June. When Buenos Aires was captured on 2 July, Narcissus was sent home with the captured specie. Captain Charles Malcolm replaced Donnelly in August.

The ship was subsequently sent to serve in the Bay of Biscay, where she captured the Spanish 12-gun schooner Cautela on 18 August 1807. From March the following year she was on the blockade of Lorient, and with HMS Naiad she captured the French 16-gun privateer Fanny and French 4-gun privateer Superbe on 16 December. Captain Frederick Aylmer assumed command in July 1809. Narcissus then captured two French 14-gun privateers, Duguay Trouin on 19 January 1810 and Aimable Josephine on 5 February, before being paid off in March 1812. After repairs she was recommissioned under Captain John Lumley and sailed to North America on 29 September. Serving on the Jamaica Station, Narcissus captured the 12-gun brig USS Viper on 17 January 1813, and the American 12-gun privateer Revenge on 30 March. Narcissus' boats then cut out USRC Surveyor from the York River on 12 June. Captain Alexander Gordon took command in 1814, and was in turn replaced by Captain George Crofton in March 1815.

Narcissus was laid up at Deptford Dockyard in June 1816, where she became a receiving ship from 1822. In late 1823 she moved to Woolwich Dockyard to serve as a convict hospital ship. She continued there until she was sold to J. Levy in January 1837.

=== Tartar ===
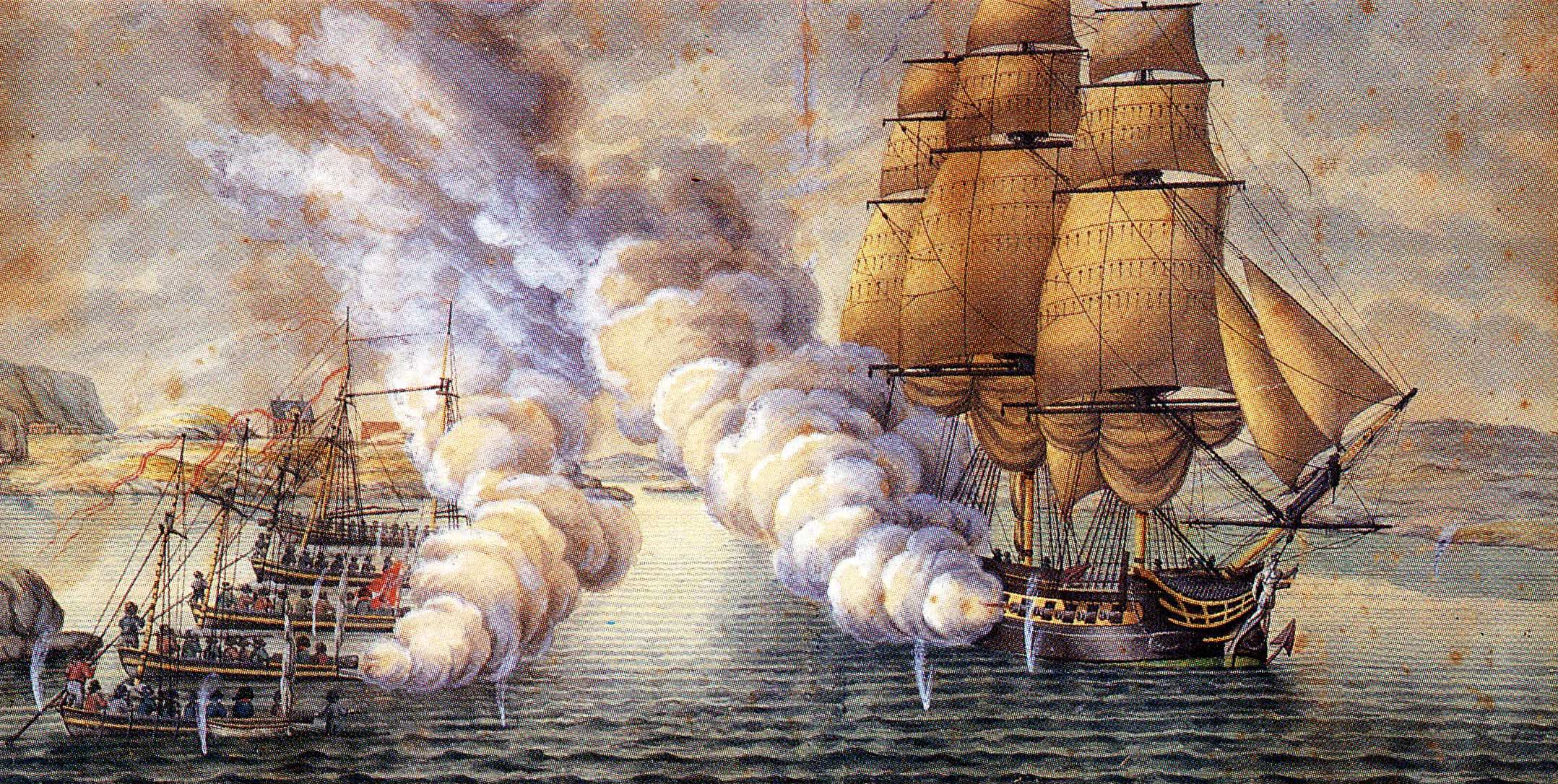
Tartar fights at the Battle of Alvøen

Tartar, named after the Tartars, was commissioned by Captain James Walker in July 1801, sailing to join the Jamaica Station in October. Captain Charles Inglis replaced Walker in June 1802, and in 1803 he handed over to Captain John Perkins. Serving at the blockade of Saint-Domingue, on 25 July Tartar was one of several ships to assist in the capture of the French 74-gun ship of the line Duquesne and French 16-gun ship Oiseau. Captain Keith Maxwell assumed command in 1804, with Tartar's boats capturing the French 10-gun privateer Hirondelle off San Domingo on 31 July. In March 1805 Maxwell was replaced by Captain Edward Hawker, under whom Tartar captured the French 18-gun brig Observateur on 9 June 1806. In the following year Captain Stephen Poyntz took command, and the ship was paid off in around October.

After a series of repairs ending in April 1808, Tartar was recommissioned under Captain George Bettesworth. Serving off Denmark, the ship fought the Battle of Alvøen against a Danish schooner and five gunboats on 15 May; Tartar sank one of the gunboats but Bettesworth and one other man were killed. Later in the month Captain Joseph Baker filled Bettesworth's place, and on 3 November he captured the Danish 7-gun privateer Naargske Gutten. Tartar then captured a Danish 4-gun privateer off Courland with her boats on 15 May 1809 and served impactfully at the Battle of Anholt on 27 March 1811, after which she captured several transport ships. On 18 August Tartar ran aground on Dago Island; the crew re-floated her but she had sprung a leak that they were unable to fix. Baker beached the ship at Kahar Inlet on 21 August and burned her two days later. The crew was picked up by HMS Ethalion.

=== Cornelia ===
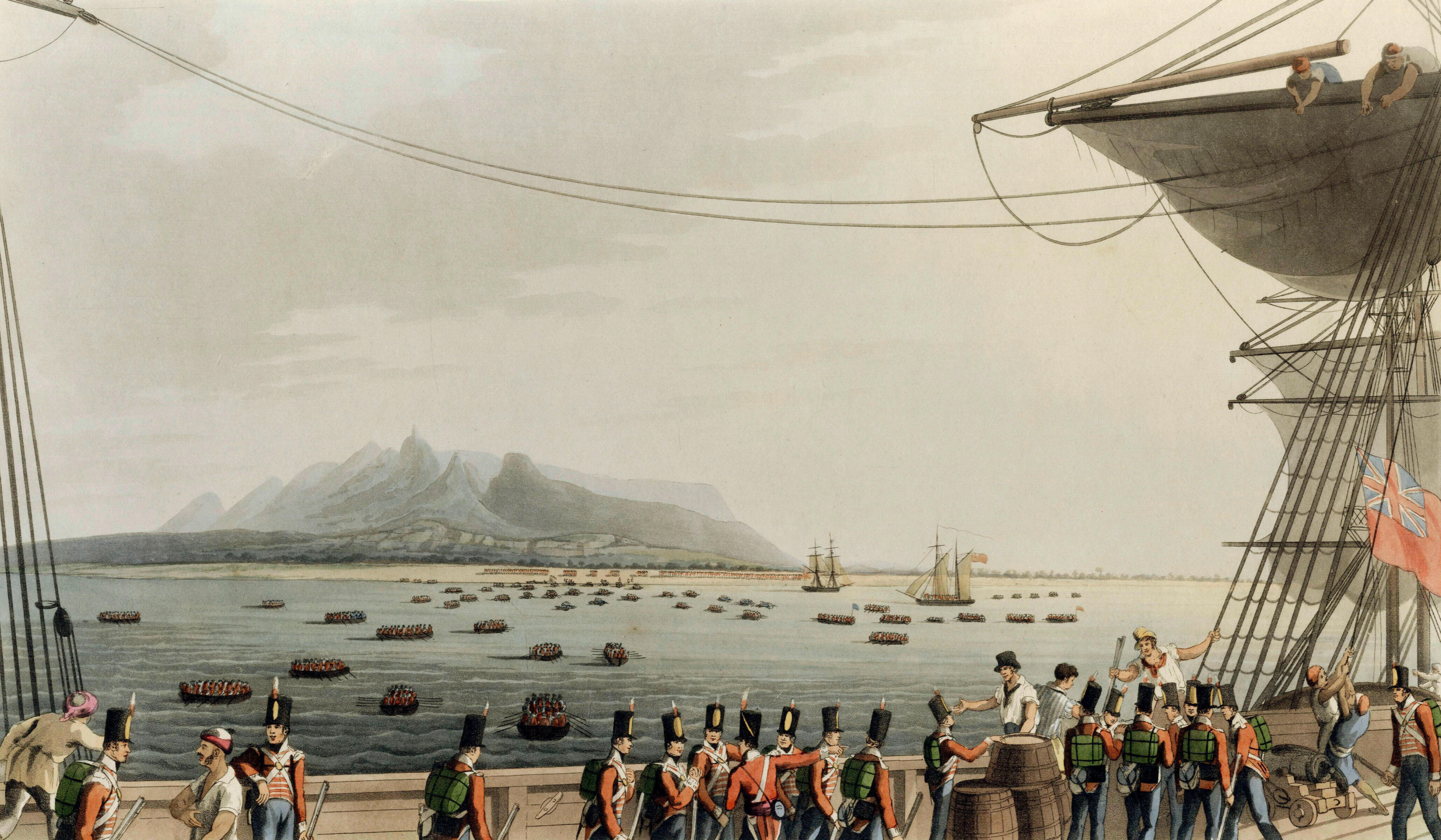
Landings at the invasion of Isle de France

Cornelia, named after the mother of the Gracchi brothers Cornelia, was commissioned by Captain Henry Edgell in November 1808, and on 30 December sailed for the East Indies Station. As part of such the frigate was present at the invasion of Isle de France in November and December 1810, and participated in the invasion of Java in the following year. After this, in August or September Edgell was replaced by Captain William Fitzwilliam Owen; Cornelia was paid off in 1813 and went into ordinary at Woolwich Dockyard. She was broken up at Sheerness Dockyard in June 1814.

=== Siren and Doris ===
Siren and Doris, the latter named after the sea-goddess Doris, were planned as the fourth and fifth frigates of the Narcissus class. Ordered to William Record at Appledore, both ships were cancelled on 24 June 1806 when the shipyard failed. Siren was laid down towards the end of 1805 and the frame had been completed at the time of cancellation, but construction on Doris was never begun.
