= HMS Diana (1807) =

Brig of the Royal Navy

History

United Kingdom
- Name: HMS Diana
- Acquired: 1807
- Honours and awards: Naval General Service Medal (NGSM) with clasp "Diana 11 Sept. 1809"
- Fate: Condemned May 1810

General characteristics
- Crew: 1807:26; 1808:45
- Armament: 1807:10 × 12-pounder carronades; 1808:10 × 6-pounder guns

HMS Diana was variously described as a brig or cutter. Her origins are currently obscure, but the British Royal Navy acquired her at Bombay in 1807. In her short career she captured three armed vessels, one in a notable single-ship action. She was condemned in 1810.

== Career ==
Lieutenant William Kempthorne commissioned Diana in 1807. He had been First Lieutenant on HMS Cornwallis. She sailed from Bombay on her first cruise in May 1807 with only 26 officers and men.

On 8 August 1807 Diane captured Topaze, an American pirate schooner, near Macao. Kempthorne was knocked overboard from his jolly boat, badly wounded in the head and back by boarding pikes. However, he resumed the attack when a cutter came up. Some 29 men aboard Topaze were killed or wounded; Diana had three men wounded. Topaze was later condemned as a prize.

A year later, on 6 August 1808, Diana captured the Dutch national brig Vlieg, which was anchored near the fort of Serookie in Java. Vlieg was armed with six long 6-pounder guns. She was carrying a number of brass guns for Sourabaya. (Note: This may have been the brig Vlieg, launched at Amsterdam on 20 June 1788. She measured 75 × 20½ × 15¼ (in Amsterdam feet (voet) of 11 Amsterdam inches (duim) (see Dutch units of measurement). The Amsterdam foot is about 8% shorter than an English foot. She was armed with four to eight guns.)

Towards the close of 1808, Rear-Admiral Drury wished to threaten Canton in order to press some demands on the Chinese government. He dispatched Kempthorne in command of a small squadron consisting of Diana, a prize brig, and the British East India Company's vessel Discovery. They sailed up the Pearl River to Canton. They blockaded the city until Drury called off the show of force.

Diana and Discovery then sailed to Manila in January 1809 to recover Captain William Pakenham and the crew of the frigate HMS Greyhound which had been wrecked in the Philippines on 4 October 1808. The Spanish released the crew on parole.

While Diana and Discovery were returning to India when near Pulo Aor they encountered two French frigates, Canonnière and Laurel, a Royal Navy post ship that Canonnière had captured in September 1808. The French chased the two British vessels down to the Straits of Singapore. Diana escaped by throwing her guns overboard and sailing by Point Romania (near Pedra Branca, Singapore), however the French captured Discovery, which was carrying Captain Packenham and some of his officers and crew. The French took their captives to Batavia. (Note: Packenham was allowed to depart but the remainder were kept in intolerable conditions until September 1809. At that time the Dutch permitted their captives to leave aboard HMS Piemontaise. Packenham died in 1811 when his ship HMS Saldanha wrecked on the Irish coast.)

On 10 September 1809 Diana was sailing into the Bay of Amarang (Amurang) in the north-east corner of the island of Celebes when she sighted the Dutch 14-gun brig Zephyr anchored under a fort. (Note: There is a Portuguese fort, constructed in 1512, at Amurang 1.18567°N 124.57285°E.) During the night Kempthorne sent in his boats only to discover that Zephyr had sailed away. Kempthorne thought that she might have sailed to Manado, some 40 miles away, and set off in pursuit. In the evening of 11 September Diana sighted Zephyr but could not catch up before Zephyr took shelter under the guns of the fort there. (Note: In 1658 the Dutch East India Company had built Fort Nieuw Amsterdam at Manado, replacing an earlier Spanish fort.) As a gale developed, Captain-Lieutenant Gillet Vander-Veld sailed out, with Diana trying to draw him further from out. However, Zephyr then turned back, with Diana following. Diana engaged Zephyr for about 70 minutes, at which time Zephyr struck. She had suffered five men killed and eight wounded out of her crew of 45 men; Diana had no casualties. A few shots from Diana dispersed five gunboats that were rowing out to assist Zephyr. Diana took Zephyr in tow and departed. (Note: Head money was paid in 1824. A first-class share was worth £37 18s 1¾d; a sixth-class share, that of an ordinary seaman, was worth £1 13s 2½d.) (Note: The brief announcement in the London Gazette of the action misidentified Zephyr as Tephin.) In 1847 the Admiralty awarded the Naval General Service Medal to the surviving claimants from the action.

At some point Diana grounded on reefs at 3°8′N 107°42′E, somewhat south of Great Natuna Island. Kempthorne named the reefs the "Diana Reefs".

On 13 May 1810 Diana was in company with HMS Cornelia and Sir Francis Drake when they captured some slaves at Diego Garcia. (Note: A first-class share of the bounty money was worth £299 11s 4d; a sixth-class share was worth £3 1s 0¾d.)

== Fate ==
Diana was surveyed and laid up at Rodrigues in May 1810. This gave rise to an erroneous report in Steel's List that she had been wrecked there. Kempthorne had been recommended for promotion to Commander for his capture of Zephyr, but this report delayed his promotion until April 1811.
