= Mouche No. 2-class schooner-avisos =

Mouche
Class overview
- Name: Mouche No.2 class
- Operators: French Navy
- Planned: 28
- Completed: 28
- Lost: 18

General characteristics
- Displacement: 60–80 tons (French)
- Length: 18.43 m (60.5 ft) (overall); 14.94 m (49.0 ft) (keel)
- Beam: 5.28 m (17.3 ft)
- Complement: 12–25 men
- Armament: 1 × 4-pounder or 6-pounder gun (on a pivot amidships) + swivel guns on some schooners

The Mouche No. 2-class schooner-avisos were a class of twenty-eight 1-gun dispatch or advice boats of the French Navy, all built between 1808 and 1810. Jean Baudry designed the vessels based on the draught of Villaret. (Note: There is some confusion about Villaret's origins. French records describe Villaret as being the former HMS Flying Fish (or Kingfish). There is disagreement within British records and between British and French records as to the origins and the fate of Flying Fish. The French attribution is clearly incorrect. Not only did Flying Fish have a different history, the Ballahoo-class schooners, of which Flying Fish was one, were longer and wider than the Mouche No.2-class schooners.) Baudry may have been the builder on the schooners launched at Bayonne.

== Mouche No.2 ==
She was launched at Bayonne on 14 June 1808. She sailed from Bayonne for Isle de France (Mauritius), on 14 June, and disappeared at sea.

== Mouche No.3 ==
She was launched at Bayonne on 5 June 1808. HMS Cossack captured her, but there are conflicting accounts of when and where this occurred. Lloyd's List reported that on 27 August "the Mouche French National Schooner of one gun, four swivels, and 24 men, from Bayonne to the Havannah, with Dispatches, arrived at Plymouth, 27 instant, Prize to the Cossack SW." Some French records suggest that she was captured on 19 August 1808 in the Antilles. The prize money notice in the London Gazette gives the date of capture as 5 August.

== Mouche No.4 ==
She was launched at Bayonne on 23 June 1808. In late 1808 she was under the command of enseigne de vaisseau auxiliaire Sorel, and carrying dispatches from Saint-Domingue to Pasajes, and then returning to Bayonne. She underwent refitting at Bayonne in January 1809, but a boat, under the command of Lieutenant Joseph William Bazalgette of HMS Resistance, captured her on 27 February 1809 off the north coast of Spain. In the action, the lieutenant de vaiseau commanding Mouche No.4 was killed. The prize money notice credited Resistance and HMS Arethusa with the capture, as well as that of four other merchant vessels on the 26th and 27th. It also gave the name of Mouche No.4's commander as "Sorrel".

== Mouche No.5 ==
She was launched at Bayonne on 25 June 1808. She was initially under the command of enseigne de vaisseau auxiliaire Gautier. French records indicate that she was destroyed on 9 March 1809 to prevent capture. Resistance's crew received head money for her destruction.

== Mouche No.6 ==
She was launched at Bayonne in June 1808. On 26 July she was at Bayonne under the command of lieutenant de vaisseau Ducrest de Villeneuve, who was to sail her on a mission to Ìle de France. The Spanish seized her near Manilla on 24 May 1809. Lieutenant de vaisseau Pierre Bouvet, in Entreprenant, recovered her crew.

== Mouche No.7 ==
She was launched at Bayonne on 8 July 1808. Under the command of enseigne de vaiseau Kernafflen, she visited Pasajes and Bilbao. On 10 June 1809 HMS Amelia, HMS Statira, and the Spaniards captured her at Santander, Spain.

== Mouche No.8 ==
She was launched at Bayonne on 5 September 1808. Under the command of enseigne de vaisseau provisoire Lamouroux she sailed from Santons to Castro Urdiales, and then to Santander. The French Navy renamed her Serin on 4 June 1817, and recommissioned her on 28 June, probably for colonial service. She left Brest in August as part of an expedition whose objective was to re-establish French control over French Guiana, replacing the Portuguese. (Note: The Anglo-Portuguese invasion of Cayenne (1809), had established Portuguese control over French Guiana. The Treaty of Paris (1814) returned the colony to France, but a Portuguese government remained in place until the French returned in 1817.) Serin was lost on 16 October in a squall as she was en route to Cayenne via Senegal.

== Mouche No.9 ==
She was launched at Rochefort Dockyard on 10 September 1808, and her builder was Jean-Baptiste Lemoyne-Sérigny. On 9 August 1814 she was at Rochefort under the command of enseigne de vaisseau de Maillé-Brézé. She was condemned at Rochefort in March 1817 and broken up there in April.

== Mouche No.10 ==
She was launched at Rochefort Dockyard on 10 September 1808 and her builder was Jean-Baptiste Lemoyne-Sérigny. She was condemned at Rochefort in March 1817 and broken up there in April.

== Mouche No.11 ==
She was launched at Basse-Indre on 19 September 1808 and her builders were Mathurin & Antoine Crucy. Between 9 October and 30 November 1809, while under the command of enseigne de vaisseau Flesselles, she carried dispatches from Paimbœuf to Basse-Terre. The French Navy burned her at Guadeloupe in February 1810 to prevent the Royal Navy from capturing her during the invasion of Guadeloupe (1810). In early 1810 HMS Hazard took part in the invasion of Guadeloupe. During the invasion, Hazard led the fleet into Anse de Barque where she saw a French schooner anchored under the batteries and on fire. Robertson and a boarding party of marines boarded the burning schooner Mouche despite fire from the shore batteries that were trying either to sink them or the schooner. By the time Robertson was able to board the schooner part of her deck had burnt away; while the boarding party was cutting away her masts the intense heat discharged all her guns. Still the boarding party was able to bring her out and to seize the French "general marine signal book", the signals of France's allies, and other important documents that she had just brought out with her from France.

== Mouche No.12 ==
She was launched at Lorient Dockyard on 22 September 1808. Between 1814 and 1816 she was armed with one 4-pounder gun, and four 12-pounder carronades. The French Navy renamed her Rossignol on 24 March 1817 and then commissioned her on 9 April, probably for colonial service. She and her entire crew were lost on 21 October in a hurricane near Martinique.

== Mouche No.13 ==
She was launched at Brest Dockyard on 5 November 1808. In 1808 she may initially have served as a school ship. HMS Reindeer captured her on 8 March 1809. Mouche №13 was under the command of enseigne de vaisseau Detcheverry and was carrying dispatches from Brest to San Domingo when Reindeer captured her west of the Azores.

== Mouche No.14 ==
She was launched at Boulogne ca. October 1808, and her builder was Jean-Charles Garrigues. In late 1808 she was under the command of enseigne de vaisseau Tinel. She was captured by the British at Guadeloupe on 11 August 1815.

== Mouche No.15 ==
She was launched at Boulogne ca. October 1808, and her builder was Jean-Charles Garrigues. The French Navy renamed her Éclair in January 1818, and recommissioned her on 1 May 1818. She was rated as an aviso for colonial service. On 6 May enseigne de vaisseau Fontbonne sailed Eclair from Brest to Martinique. She was decommissioned there on 10 June 1825, and struck.

== Mouche No.16 ==
She was launched at Dunkirk on 13 September 1808 and her builder was Louis Bretocq. On 10–11 September 1808 she was under the command of enseigne de vaisseau auxiliaire Desgardins and cruising in front of Dunkirk and Nieuport. The French Navy renamed her Colibri in March 1817, and recommissioned her on 1 May 1817, probably as an aviso for colonial service. She was in Senegal by 1818. There she joined the brig Argus and the schooner Iris in suppressing the slave trade. (Note: Iris was a brand-new schooner, one of the first naval vessels built after the Bourbon Restoration. Between 24 March and 22 May 1818 she sailed from the Île-d'Aix roads to Saint-Louis, Senegal, under the command of enseigne de vaisseau Lefèvre. On 25 April 1820 she was back at Rochefort and under the command of enseigne de vaisseau Lainé.) Colibri was decommissioned and condemned there on 1 August 1832. She was off the fleet list in 1832 and sold and BU at Senegal.

== Mouche No.17 ==
She was launched at Flushing ca. 15 September 1808 and was also known as Goélette No.17. The French Navy decommissioned her at Antwerp on 16 February 1814 and she was struck there in May. She was probably ceded to the Netherlands in August.

== Mouche No.18 ==
She was launched at Flushing ca. 15 September 1808 and was also known as Goélette No.18. The French Navy decommissioned her at Antwerp on 1 March 1814 and she was struck there in May. She was probably ceded to the Netherlands in August.

== Mouche No.19 ==
She was launched at Flushing ca. 15 September 1808 and was also known as Goélette No.19. The French Navy decommissioned her at Antwerp on 15 February 1814 and she was struck there in May. She was probably ceded to the Netherlands in August.

== Mouche No.20 ==
She was launched at Toulon Dockyard on 24 March 1809. Between 10 July and 4 October 1810 she was under the command of l'enseigne de vaisseau Chasseriau, and carried dispatches from Marseille to Port-Mahon. The French Navy renamed her Ramier in January 1818, and recommissioned her on 25 March. Between 28 April and 29 May and while under the command of enseigne de vaisseau de Ricaudy, she sailed from Toulon to Algiers, and then to Bône, where she took up station. The Navy decommissioned her on 5 December 1826. She was condemned at Toulon on 10 March 1828 and struck there.

== Mouche No.21 ==
She was launched at Toulon Dockyard on 24 March 1809. The French Navy renamed her Moucheron in January 1818 and recommissioned her on 17 April 1818. Between 30 March and 30 July enseigne de vaisseau de Moges sailed Moucheron from Toulon to Saint-Louis, Senegal, via Marseille and Malaga. She then was stationed at Senegal, being manned by an entirely Senegalese crew from 1823. She last appears in operational records in 1826. She was off fleet list and transferred to colonial accounts in September 1830.

== Mouche No.22 ==
She was launched at Genoa on 15 July 1809 and her builder was François Pestel. The French Navy ceded her to their creditors on 17 March 1814, one day before the British captured the city; the British apparently did not seize her.

== Mouche No.23 ==
She was launched at Bayonne on 2 August 1809. On 18 September 1809 she was under the command of enseigne de vaisseau Gautier who sailed her for Île de France. However she stayed a Pasajes for a while, before sailing from there on 10 February 1810. HMS Nereide captured her on 2 June 1810 near the Cape of Good Hope. On 30 August, Astrée recaptured Mouche No.23. However, the British recaptured her in November during their invasion of Isle de France.

== Mouche No.24 ==
She was launched at Bayonne on 12 August 1809, and her builder was Jean Baudry. On 18 September 1809 she was under the command of enseigne de vaisseau Goupilleau who sailed from Bayonne with dispatches for Île de France. However, she stopped for a while at Pasajes. The French Navy renamed her Papillon in April 1817, and recommissioned her on 12 May 1817. She and all her crew disappeared in a hurricane at Martinique on 21 October.

== Mouche No.25 ==
She was launched at Bayonne in 1809. The British captured her on 15 March 1810 at or near Guadeloupe.

== Mouche No.26 ==
She was launched at Bayonne on 29 August 1809. On 11 January 1810, HMS Indefatigable captured Mouche № 26 near Cap de Peñas. Under the command of Enseigne de vausseau provisorie Fleury she had sailed from Pasajes with despatches for Île de France. The next day Mouche № 26 foundered near the Penmarks. Fleury, presumably among others, was drowned.

== Mouche No.27 ==
She was launched at Bayonne on 20 October 1809. On 7 September 1810 she was at Bayonne under the command of enseigne de vaisseau auxiliaire Lamouroux and about to embark on a mission to Île de France. A British frigate flying the French flag captured her on 12 January 1811 at the entrance to Port Napoléon (Port Louis, Île de France). The prize money notice gives the names of six British vessels that shared in the proceeds.

== Mouche No.28 ==
She was launched at Bayonne in November 1809. On 15 November 1810 HMS Hesper captured Mouche No. 28 near Île Bonaparte (Réunion) as she was carrying dispatches to the Île de France. A boarding party in Hesper's cutter suffered three men wounded while boarding Mouche; French casualties were two men killed and five wounded, one of whom was Mouche No.28's commander. The British recommissioned her for the attack on Île de France.

== Mouche No.29 ==
She was launched at Nantes on 19 February 1810 and her builder was Antoine Crucy. She was refitted at Lorient between March and May 1815, and she then sailed for Île Bourbon on 16 May. Once there, she probably became the Lys that was in service at Île Bourbon in June. Lys grounded in 1825 on Providence Atoll in the Indian Ocean, but remained in service at Bourbon in October 1827. Lys was never carried on fleet lists.
