= HMS Pomone (1811) =

Frigate of the Royal Navy

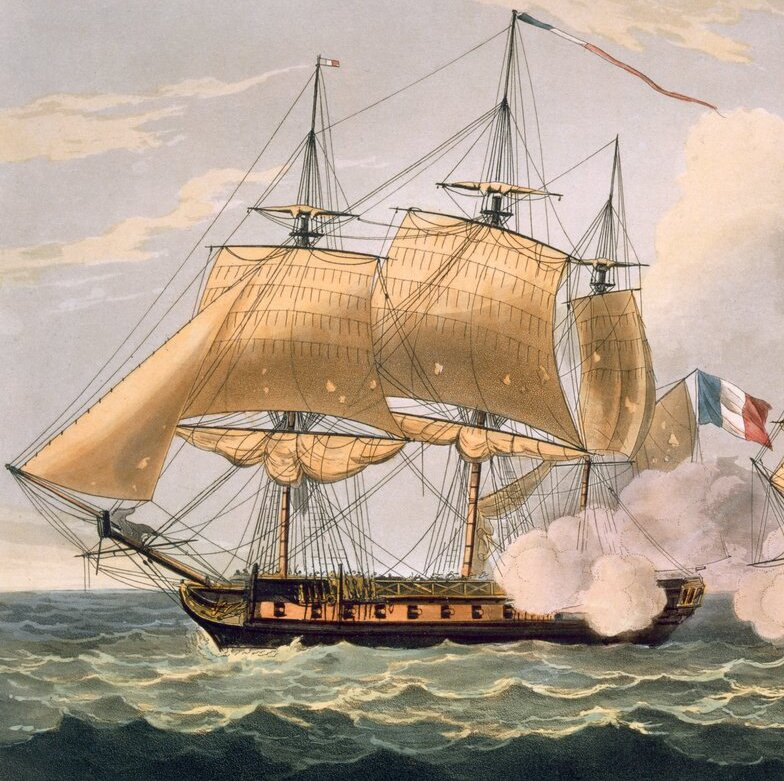
- Clorinde, a sister ship of Pomone

History

France
- Name: Astrée
- Namesake: Astraea
- Builder: Cherbourg
- Laid down: May 1808
- Launched: 1 May 1809
- Commissioned: 22 July 1809
- Captured: 4 December 1810

United Kingdom
- Name: HMS Pomone
- Acquired: 4 December 1810
- Commissioned: February 1812
- Fate: Broken up in 1816

General characteristics
- Class & type: Pallas-class frigate
- Tons burthen: 1093 42/94 (bm)
- Length: 152 ft 0 in (46.3 m) (overall); 127 ft 5 in (38.8 m) (keel)
- Beam: 40 ft 2 in (12.2 m)
- Draught: 12 ft 9 in (3.9 m)
- Propulsion: 1950 m^{2} of Sail
- Complement: French service:326; British service: 300 (later 315)
- Armament: French service: Battery: 28 18-pounders; QD & Fc: 8 × 8-pounder long guns + 8 × 36-pounder carronades or 12 × 18-pounder carronades; British service: Upper deck: 28 × 18-pounder guns; QD: 14 × 32-pounder carronades; Fc: 2 × 9-pounder guns + 2 × 32-pounder carronades

Astrée was a 44-gun Pallas-class frigate of the French Navy, launched at Cherbourg in 1809. In December of the next year she captured HMS Africaine. The Royal Navy captured Astrée in 1810 and took her into service under her French name, rating her as a 38-gun frigate, but then in 1811 recommissioned her as HMS Pomone. She served during the War of 1812 and was broken up in 1816.

== French service ==
Astrée took part in the campaign in the Indian Ocean under Commander René Lemarant de Kerdaniel, serving with Hamelin's squadron. She also was present in the final stages of the Battle of Grand Port.

A few days later, on 30 August, Astrée recaptured the 1-gun schooner-aviso Mouche No. 23, which HMS Nereide had captured 2 June.

Astrée came to be part of a squadron under Pierre Bouvet, who had assumed command of the French squadron at Grand Port after Duperré was wounded, and had been promoted to capitaine de frégate. The squadron also comprised Iphigenia as a flagship, and the sloop Entreprenant.

=== Capture of HMS Africaine ===
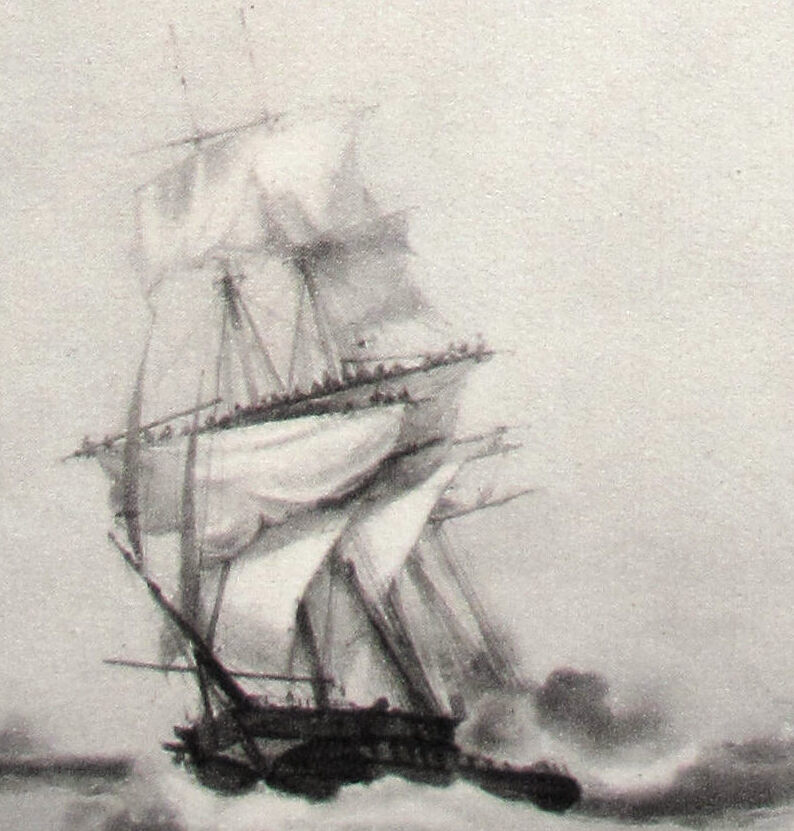
Painting of HMS Africaine

On 12 September 1810, Bouvet's squadron intercepted HMS Africaine (commanded by Captain Robert Corbet) off Saint-Denis, as the frigate Boadicea, the sloop Otter and the brig Staunch were sailing from the bay of Saint-Paul. Bouvet lured the British into pursuit.

At midnight Bouvet sent Astrée forwards, creating the impression that Iphigénie was to slow Africaine down to allow the rest of the squadron to flee. At 3 am, Astrée regained her place at the rear of the squadron. The weather, which had been rough, improved somewhat, and in the moonlight Astrée suddenly found herself at gun range of Africaine.

A gunnery duel followed immediately, which damaged Astrée's rigging. She closed in to Iphigénie with Africaine in close pursuit. Africaine, her guns still trained at Astrée, soon found herself under fire from Iphigénie. After half an hour of exchanging fire at point-black range, an exchange in which the French had the upper hand, the British attempted a boarding, which Iphigénie easily eluded. The boarding attempt gave Astrée an opportunity to rake Africaine's bow. At 4:30, Africaine struck her colours.

All officers of Africaine had been killed or wounded in the action, save for Colonel Barry, and only 69 men were uninjured. Bouvet was given Corbet's dagger, which he kept in his personal possession. The French abandoned Africaine and the next day HMS Boadicea recaptured her.

On 3 December 1810, the British completed their invasion of Isle de France. The ships moored at the island were surrendered, including Iphigénie, Bellone and Astrée. The British took Astrée into service as a 38-gun fifth rate and renamed her HMS Pomone on 26 October 1811, the previous HMS Pomone having been wrecked earlier in the month.

== British service ==
Pomone underwent repairs at Portsmouth from November 1811 to April 1812. She was commissioned under Captain Robert Lambert in February 1812. At some point Captain Francis William Fane took command, and on 23 May 1812 sailed her for Newfoundland. On 4 August Pomone recaptured Kitty, which the American privateer Rossie had captured five days earlier. Pomone then sent Kitty into Newfoundland.

Captain Philip Carteret took command of Pomone in December 1812.

On 26 May 1813, Pomone recaptured two Spanish vessels El Correv Diligente de Carraccas and Nostra Senora de los Desemperados. She apparently shared the salvage with Tuscan and some three other vessels.

Early on the morning of 21 October 1813, Pomone was in the Bay of Biscay repairing damage following a gale in which she had lost her fore-yard. By chance she fell in with a ship under jury masts that proved to be a French frigate.

Carteret was about to attack when another vessel, which also appeared to be a frigate, and a brig flying French colours, emerged from the haze, followed by three more indistinct vessels. To avoid hazarding Pomone, Carteret got well to windward of them. However, when the wind cleared in the afternoon it was discovered that they were all merchantmen except for the frigate under jury masts and the second frigate.

Carteret moved to attack the second frigate but she turned out to be a large Portuguese East Indiaman, which the French had taken and the British retaken. Carteret then sailed for four days in a fruitless search for the frigate under jury masts before he was able to find out that Andromache had captured her on 23 October. She was Trave, and the Royal Navy took her into service as the troop transport HMS Trave.

An anonymous letter from "The Pomone's Ship's Company" was passed to the admiral at Lisbon asserting with respect to Carteret that "he had run from a French frigate". Carteret asked for a court martial to clear his name. The court martial took place at Plymouth on Salvador del Mundo on 31 December. When no one could be found to offer testimony against him, Carteret summoned those he suspected, plus one quarter of the ship's company chosen by lot. After the board had examined the witnesses it acquitted Carteret of all blame.

After service in the North Sea and the waters around France, Pomone sailed to the east coast of the United States to serve during the War of 1812.

On 6 December 1813 as John and James, Crosby, master, was returning from Chili with 1000 barrels of oil, Pomone captured her and sent her into Bermuda. (Note: Pomone shared with Endymion in the prize money for John and James. A first-class share was worth £288 3s 6d; a sixth-class share, that of an ordinary seaman, was worth £2 6s 6 3/4d.) Around that time Pomone also captured several more American vessels, including the sloop Grampus, and the schooners Anne, Primrose, Sally, and Enterprise.

With Cydnus, Pomone captured the American privateer Bunker's Hill on 4 March 1814. Bunker's Hill carried 14 guns and had a crew of 86 men. Previously very successful, she had been cruising for eight days out of Morlaix without making a single capture. (Note: The prize money for an ordinary seaman was 16s 6 3/4d.) Bunker's Hill was the former Royal Navy cutter Linnet, which the French ship Gloire had taken about a year earlier on 25 February 1813 near Madeira.

On the night of 1–2 October 1814 Pomone and HMS Dispatch (or Despatch) used their boats to raid Drown Meadow (now Port Jefferson, New York). The boats arrived safely back at Pomone and Dispatch's anchorage around 2:30-3:00 AM on Sunday, 2 October. In the space of about three hours they had captured the American merchant sloops Two Friends, Hope, Herald, Mercantile, and Fair American, and set fire to the sloop Oneida, all without firing a shot. The captured sloops were later ransomed back to their owners with the proceeds being used to support the blockade.

Pomone was also part of the squadron that captured USS President on 15 January 1815. In April 1815 Carteret moved to Desiree and Captain John Lumley took over command. (Note: Captain John Richard Lumley died aboard HMS Topaze in 1821 as she was sailing towards Prince of Wales' Island.)

== Fate ==
In the summer of 1815 Pomone was paid off at Chatham. She was broken up at Deptford in June 1816.

== In fiction ==
HMS Pomone appears as part of Commodore Jack Aubrey's Mediterranean squadron in Patrick O'Brian's novel The Hundred Days.
