= Vittoria (1813 Whitby ship) =

Nineteenth-century transport ship

History

United Kingdom
- Name: Vittoria
- Namesake: Battle of Vitoria
- Owner: 1813:Henry Simpson and W.S. Chapman; c1817:E. Reed
- Builder: W.S. Chapman, Whitby
- Launched: 22 July 1813
- Fate: Condemned and sold for breaking up October 1820

General characteristics
- Tons burthen: 403, or 40466/94 (bm)
- Length: 107 ft 7 in (32.8 m)
- Beam: 29 ft 10 in (9.1 m)
- Propulsion: Sail
- Armament: 2 × 6-pounder guns + 8 × 18-pounder carronades

Vittoria was launched at Whitby in 1813 as a transport. She transported migrants and troops to Canada. A new owner shifted her registration to London in December 1817. The new owner then employed her in trading with India under a license from the British East India Company. She was condemned at Calcutta and sold for breaking up in October 1820.

Year	Master	Owner	Trade
1816	Dodds	Chapman	London transport

On 15 May 1817, Vittorio, Dodd, master, sailed from London. She arrived at Quebec on 6 July. She was carrying 40 migrants, 190 soldiers of the 37th Regiment of Foot, and ordnance stores for the government. At some point she grounded, but was gotten off.

Year	Master	Owner	Trade
1818	Duddman	Reed	London-India

The Register of Shipping for 1820 showed Vittoria, Driver, master, with trade London—Bengal.

On 30 August 1820 she had to put back to Calcutta as she was leaking badly. She had left Bengal for the Cape and London. She was condemned and sold on 6 October 1821 for breaking up. Her cargo was transferred to Ganges, Chivers, master.

== Sources ==
- Hackman, Rowan (2001). Ships of the East India Company. Gravesend, Kent: World Ship Society. ISBN 0-905-61796-7.
- Weatherill, Richard (1908). The ancient port of Whitby and its shipping. Whitby: Horne and Son.
