= HMS Bombay (1805) =

Frigate of the Royal Navy

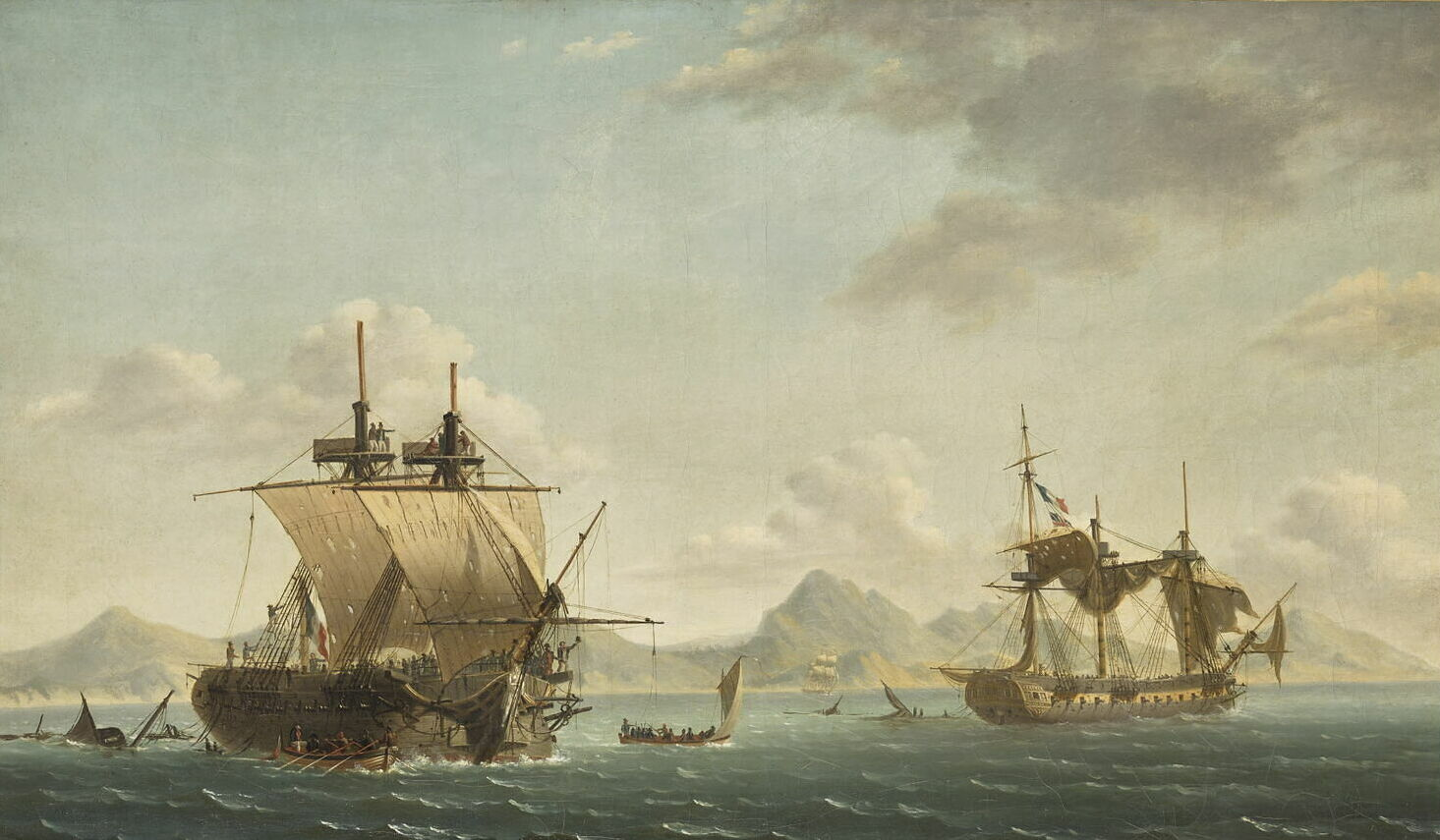
- Ceylon (right) at the action of 18 September 1810

History

British East India Company
- Name: Bombay
- Namesake: Bombay
- Builder: Bombay Dockyard
- Launched: 1793
- Fate: Sold to the Royal Navy in 1805

United Kingdom
- Name: HMS Bombay
- Acquired: April 1805
- Renamed: HMS Ceylon, 1 July 1808
- Fate: Sold on 4 July 1857; broken up 1861

General characteristics
- Type: 38-gun frigate
- Tons burthen: 639, or 67183/94, or 693 (bm)
- Length: 135 ft 0 in (41.1 m) (overall); 104 ft 10 1/4 in (32.0 m) (keel)
- Beam: 34 ft 8 1/2 in (10.6 m)
- Depth of hold: 11 ft 8 in (3.6 m)
- Complement: HMS Bombay:215; HMS Ceylon:235
- Armament: HCS Bombay: 24 × 12-pounder + 8 × 6-pounder guns; HMS Bombay; Upper deck (UD): 26 × 12-pounder guns; QD: 12 × 24-pounder carronades; Fc:2 × 6-pounder guns + 2 × 24-pounder carronades (later 32-pounders); Later; UD: 18 × 32-pounder carronades; QD: 2 × 9-pounder guns + 6 × 32-pounder carronades; Fc: 2 × 9-pounder guns; HMS Ceylon; UD: 24 × 18-pounder guns; QD & Fc: 14 × 24-pounder carronades + 2 × 9-pounder guns

HMS Bombay was a 38-gun fifth-rate frigate of the Royal Navy. She was originally the Bombay Marine frigate HCS Bombay, launched at the Bombay Dockyard in 1793. The Royal Navy purchased her in 1805 and renamed her HMS Bombay. She served with the Royal Navy under that name until 1 July 1808, when she became HMS Ceylon. Ceylon was briefly captured by the French Imperial Navy at the action of 18 September 1810 but was recaptured by the British in the same engagement. She was sold at Malta in 1857 and broken up in 1861.

== East India Company service ==
A newspaper announced on Saturday 7 December 1793 that a " 32-gun frigate The Bombay has been built by the Bombay Presidency for the Company's service. It will be commanded by Capt Pruin." She was built in the Bombay Dockyard and fitted out by public subscription. "She is a testament to Indian carpentry skill." By 1 April 1794 she was patrolling off Ceylon.

In January 1797 HCS Bombay was in Amboyna in Indonesia, under the command of Captain Charles Pickett. Pickett became unwell so the command of the ship was handed to Captain William Selby. In February Selby, together with Captain Edward Pakenham of Resistance, captured Manado in Celebes. In May Selby captured Gorontalo, also in Celebes. The following month he was delivering desperately needed rice to the nutmeg producing island of Banda. On 28 July HCS Bombay arrived back in Amboyna and was returned to the command of Captain Pickett.

In July 1803 the EIC appointed John Hayes captain. Taking his family aboard, he sailed HCS Bombay from Bombay to Calcutta, where they arrived on 11 August, and where his family established themselves. On the resumption of war with France the EIC appointed Hayes commodore of a small squadron consisting of Bombay, Mornington (22 guns), Teignmouth (16), and the armed vessel Castlereagh (16), and charged Hayes with protecting the trade routes in the Bay of Bengal and adjacent waters.

At some point, Hayes and Bombay sailed to Muckie, Sumatra, and captured the fort there. It had belonged to the EIC, but had been lost due to the "treachery of the Malays". After three days of bombardment by Bombay and Castlereagh, Hayes landed at the head of a party of seamen and took the fort and adjacent batteries, which the British dismantled. They also took off 67 guns and a quantity of stores.

== Royal Navy service ==
Admiral Sir Edward Pellew bought Bombay in April 1805. Captain Hayes apparently initially remained in command of Bombay when she came into the Royal Navy as he was listed as her captain in June 1805, but he then left her almost immediately. In April 1807 Captain William Jones Lye took command.

On 10 July 1807 she captured the French navy brig Jaseur some eight leagues off Little Andaman, after a chase of nine hours. Jaseur was armed with 12 guns and had a crew of 55 men under the command of a lieutenant de vaisseau. She had left Île de France on 15 April and had made no captures. The last distribution of the proceeds of the capture was made in August 1817. (Note: A first-class share of the prize money was worth £87 13s 6 1/2d; a fifth-class share, that of a seaman, was worth 10s 8d.)

On 11 July 1808 the Navy renamed her Ceylon.

In September 1808 Ceylon's boats recaptured Ganges after a chase of three days. Her captors sent Ganges into Calcutta.

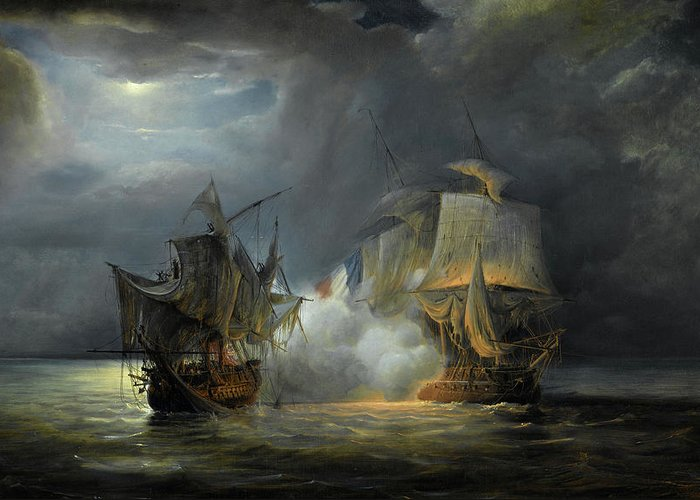
Ceylon engaging Vénus

On 17–18 September 1810 two French ships, the frigate Vénus and corvette Victor, captured Ceylon while she was under the command of Charles Gordon. Ceylon had 10 men killed and 31 wounded. The next day, a British squadron composed of HMS Boadicea, HMS Otter, and the brig HMS Staunch recaptured her, and captured Vénus; Victor managed to escape. On 3 December Ceylon was at the British invasion of Isle de France. (Note: A first-class share was worth £278 19s 5 3/4d; a sixth-class share, that of an ordinary seaman, was worth £3 7s 6 1/4d. A fourth and final payment was made in July 1828. A first-class share was worth £29 19s 5 1/4d; a sixth-class share was worth 8s 2 1/2d.)

In November 1811, Commander James Tomkinson (acting) became captain. Tomkinson sailed Bombay back to Britain; she arrived at Deptford on 8 May 1811. By 1812 she was in ordinary at Chatham.

== Post-war ==
Ceylon was fitted as a troopship between May 1813 and February 1814, with Captain Arthur P. Hamilton commissioning her in November 1813. Captain Peter Rye may have preceded him in 1813. (Note: For more on Captain Peter Rye see: O'Byrne, William R. (1849). "Rye, Peter" . A Naval Biographical Dictionary. London: John Murray.) She and the troopship HMS Melpomene returned from Bermuda, accompanied by the warships Bacchante and Curlew, arriving at Portsmouth on 22 June 1815.

In August 1815 she accompanied the 74-gun Northumberland, and the storeship Weymouth as Northumberland carried Napoleon into exile at Saint Helena. Ceylon was then laid up at Plymouth in May 1816.

Between 1817 and 1830 she was a troopship. She was fitted as a receiving ship between January and October 1832. Then in 1833 she became a receiving ship at Malta, and her armament was reduced to two guns.

From July 1838 to 1842 she was under the command of William Robert Mends. From March 1843 she was the flagship for Sir Lucius Curtis. Then in April 1846, Thomas Graves assumed command. In 1847 H.N.J. Chesshyre replaced Graves. Admiral Edward Harvey raised his flag in Ceylon in March 1848. Joseph Sparkhall Rundle became captain from April 1850. His replacement, in December 1854 was C.G. Robinson. From 1853 to 1855 she was the flagship of the Admiral superintendent at Malta (Rear-Admiral Montagu Stopford and Admiral Houston Stewart during this period).

== Fate ==
Ceylon was sold at Malta on 4 July 1857 for £900. She was broken up in 1861.
