= Charles Gordon (Royal Navy officer) =

Admiral Charles Gordon CB
- Born: 1781
- Died: 2 October 1860 (aged 78–79); Bath, Somerset
- Military career
- Allegiance: United Kingdom
- Branch: Royal Navy
- Service years: 1796 to 1860
- Rank: Admiral
- Conflicts: French Revolutionary Wars; Napoleonic Wars; Persian Gulf campaign of 1809; Action of 18 September 1810; Invasion of Île de France
- Awards: Companion of the Order of the Bath

Admiral Charles Gordon, CB (1781 – 3 October 1860) was an officer of the British Royal Navy during the nineteenth century. Gordon's most notable action was the action of 18 September 1810, when he was seriously wounded in battle and his frigate HMS Ceylon captured by the French frigate Vénus. Gordon was recaptured by Commodore Josias Rowley the following day and later took part in the capture of Île de France. This was the second occasion on which Gordon had been captured, but he had also distinguished himself in operations against Persian Gulf pirates in the campaign of 1809 and was flag captain at the capture of Île de France in December 1810. His later career was unremarkable, although he eventually rose to become an admiral and was made a Companion of the Order of the Bath before his death in 1860.

Gordon was the third son of Robert Francis Grant-Gordon and Mary Aston, daughter of Sir Willoughby Aston, 5th Baronet. He was the younger brother of Sir James Willoughby Gordon, who was created a baronet and Rear-Admiral Henry Gordon, who was twice mayor of Bath.

== Military career ==
Charles Gordon joined the Royal Navy in June 1796 as a midshipman and by later advanced to become a commander in the sloop St Lucia. In 1807 he was captured but was exchanged soon afterwards and made a post captain in command of HMS Caroline, which he commanded in the Indian Ocean, operating against pirates in the Persian Gulf during the campaign of 1809: At Ras al-Khaymah in November 1809, Caroline destroyed or captured 80 pirate vessels. Shortly after the operations in the Persian Gulf, Gordon took command of the Indian-built frigate HMS Ceylon and continued operating in the Indian Ocean, based at Madras.

In September 1810, word reached Madras that the British force that was blockading the French island of Île de France had been destroyed at the Battle of Grand Port and its commander Josias Rowley was in desperate need of reinforcement. Sailing south to join Rowley, Ceylon visited Port Napoleon on Île de France in the hope of meeting Rowley there. Instead he found the large French frigate Vénus and the corvette Iéna under the command of Commodore Jacques Hamelin. The French ships chased Ceylon westwards towards Île Bourbon and caught her on 17 September within sight of Saint Denis. In a series of bitterly contested engagements during the night, Ceylon was battered and defeated, the badly wounded Gordon surrendering to Hamelin, but only after inflicting significant damage to his flagship. Gordon was taken aboard the French ship and was thus freed when Rowley chased and captured Hamelin's ship on 18 September. At the eventual court martial into his conduct in the action, Gordon was honourably acquitted.

Although badly wounded in the action, Gordon was made captain of HMS Africaine, which later served as Admiral Albemarle Bertie's flagship in the successful invasion of Île de France. In the aftermath of the campaign, Gordon was sent back to Britain and despite living another 50 years and remaining in the Navy throughout, he never again served at sea. He was appointed a Companion of the Order of the Bath and gradually rose through the retired ranks, becoming a vice-admiral in 1853, and a full admiral prior to his death in October 1860 aged 79.

== Personal life ==
Gordon married Anne Blayney, daughter of Lt.-Gen. Lord Blayney in 1818.
