= Ganges (1806 ship) =

History
- Name: Ganges
- Namesake: Ganges
- Builder: Michael Smith, Calcutta
- Launched: 30 September 1806
- Fate: Last listed in 1846

General characteristics
- Tons burthen: 40011/94, or 401, or 412, or 418, or 419, or 449(bm)
- Length: 108 ft 6 in (33.1 m)
- Beam: 30 ft 2 in (9.2 m)
- Armament: 1811:16 × 9-pounder guns ("of the New Construction"); 1815:2 × 12-pounder carronades
- Notes: Teak

Ganges was launched at Calcutta in 1806. In 1807 or 1809 a French privateer captured her. The British Royal Navy recaptured her the next year. She assumed British Registry in 1812, but had traded out of London since late 1810 or early 1811. By 1820 she was trading between London and Bengal. She was last listed in 1846.

== Career ==
One source reported that Ganges was captured in 1809, and then at some point was lost at sea. A more contemporary source reported that the French privateer Courier had captured her, by inference in the first half of 1807. It further reported that in September 1808 the boats of HMS Ceylon had recaptured Ganges after a chase of three days. Her captors sent Ganges into Calcutta.

In 1809 Ganges, of 412 tons (bm), D. Chauvet, master, and Hugh A. Reid, owner, was registered at Calcutta.

Ganges first appeared in Lloyd's Register (LR) in 1810 with Patterson, master, H.Fleming, owner, and trade London–Jamaica. LR gave her burthen as 449 tons. The Register of Shipping (RS) also showed her burthen as 449 tons, but in 1815 it amended the entry for Ganges to show 401 tons.

Year	Master	Owner	Trade	Source & notes
1811	Paterson; A.Grant	Fleming	London–Jamaica	LR
1812	A.Grant; T.Nichols	H. Fleming	London–Martinique; Malta	LR

On 27 June 1812 Ganges was admitted to the registry of Great Britain.

Year	Master	Owner	Trade	Source & notes
1815	Beer; C.Swann	Fleming	London–West Indies	LR
1815	T.Nichols; C.Swann	Fleming	London–Malta; London–Jamaica	RS
1820	Merriman; A.Chivers	Fleming	London–India	LR

In August 1815 Ganges, Swann, master, put into Havana to reprovision and get water. She was on her way from Jamaica to London.

On 18 October 187, Ganges, Merriman, master, broke from her iron cable at Simon's Bay in a severe gale.

The ship Vittoria was condemned and sold on 6 October for breaking up. Her cargo was transferred to Ganges, Chivers, master. Ganges sailed from Bengal on 14 November, the Cape of Good Hope on 14 February 1821, and St Helena on 1 March. She was off Plymouth by 21 April.

On 1 June 1825 Ganges, Lloyd, master, arrived in the Ganges River from Madras and London and proceeded to ground near Fultah. It was expected that some of her cargo would have to be unloaded before she could be gotten off. Still, on 3 June she arrived off Calcutta and it appeared that she had not sustained any serious injury.

Year	Master	Owner	Trade	Source & notes
1825	Lloyd	Chivers & Co.	London–Madras	LR
1830	Lloyd; Ardlie	Lloyd; Ardlie	London–Calcutta; Bombay	RS; small repairs 1829

In their 1830 issues, both LR and the RS changed their numbers for Ganges's burthen. The RS reported her burthen at 418 tons, and LR reported it as 419 tons. The 1833 issues continued to show Ardlie as owner and master.

The RS ceased publishing in 1834, and Ganges did not appear in LR for that year. However, Ardlie continued as her master. On 19 February 1834, John Martin Ardlie was carrying a detachment of the 15th Native Infantry. The officer commanding the detachment got into an altercation with Ardlie, with the two exchanging blows. The Bengal Army court martial found the Army officer, Major Francis Haleman, guilty of conduct unbecoming an officer.

Ganges did not reappear in LR until the 1837 issue (published in 1836). At that time her master was Brodhurst, her owner J.Ardlie, and her trade London–Calcutta.

Then, a list of vessels trading to India and east of the Cape of Good Hope (CGH; the Cape) showed Ganges with John M. Ardlie, master and owner, preparing to sail on 13 June 1837 with destination the Cape and Swan River.

Year	Master	Owner	Trade	Source
1840	Ardlie; Walker	Ardlie; Mangles	London–Calcutta; London–"SRiver" (Swan River)	LR; small repairs 1837 & 1841
1845	Walker	Mangles	London–East Indies	LR; small repairs 1841

Ganges, Captain Samuel C. Walker, sailed from London and Liverpool in 1841. She arrived at Freemantle in the Swan River Colony on 15 October. There she landed some 110–123 immigrants, including indentured labourers.

== Fate ==
Ganges was last listed in 1846 with data unchanged from 1845.
