= Action of 18 September 1810 =

1810 battle of the Mauritius campaign of 1809–1811

- Part of the Mauritius campaign of 1809–1811
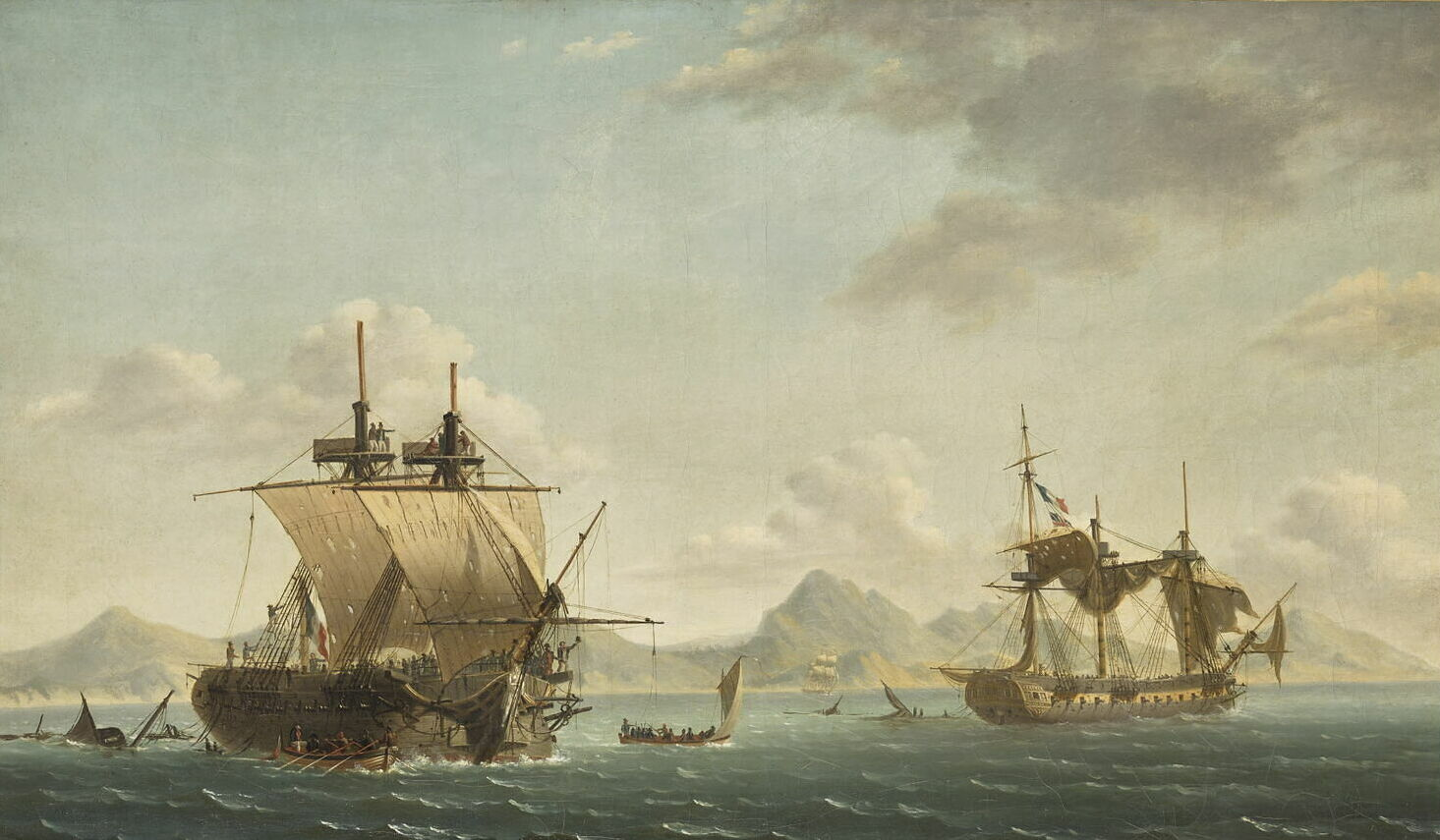
- c. 1825 painting of the battle
Date	18 September 1810
Location	Off Isle Bourbon, Indian Ocean
Result	British victory

Belligerents
United Kingdom	France

Commanders and leaders
Charles Gordon; Josias Rowley	Jacques Hamelin (surrendered)

Strength
2 frigates	1 frigate 1 corvette

Casualties and losses
10 killed 33 wounded	9 killed 15 wounded 1 frigate captured

The action of 18 September 1810 was fought between frigates of the British and French navies in the Indian Ocean during the Napoleonic Wars. The engagement was one of several between rival frigate squadrons contesting control of the French colony of Isle de France, from which French frigates had raided British trade routes during the war. The action came in the immediate aftermath of the Battle of Grand Port, in which four British frigates had been lost, and just four days after a fifth British frigate had been captured and subsequently recaptured in the action of 13 September 1810.

Due to the heavy losses suffered by the British forces, reinforcements were urgently dispatched to the area but they became individual targets for the larger French squadron blockading the British base at Isle Bourbon. HMS Ceylon had been despatched by the British authorities at Madras after the Battle of Grand Port to reinforce the remains of the squadron under Commodore Josias Rowley on Isle Bourbon. Searching for Rowley off Isle de France, Ceylon was spotted by French Commodore Jacques Félix Emmanuel Hamelin who gave chase in his flagship Vénus, supported by a corvette.

Vénus was faster than Ceylon, and although Captain Charles Gordon almost reached the safety of Isle Bourbon, he was run down and forced to engage the French ship during the night, both frigates inflicting severe damage on one another before the wounded Gordon surrendered to the approaching corvette. As dawn broke, Rowley's flagship HMS Boadicea arrived, recaptured Ceylon, drove off the corvette and forced the battered French flagship to surrender, capturing Hamelin. This was the last ship-to-ship action in the region before the successful invasion of Isle de France in December 1810: without Hamelin the French squadron, short on supplies and low on morale, did not contest British control of the region and failed to even attempt to disrupt the invasion fleet.

== Background ==
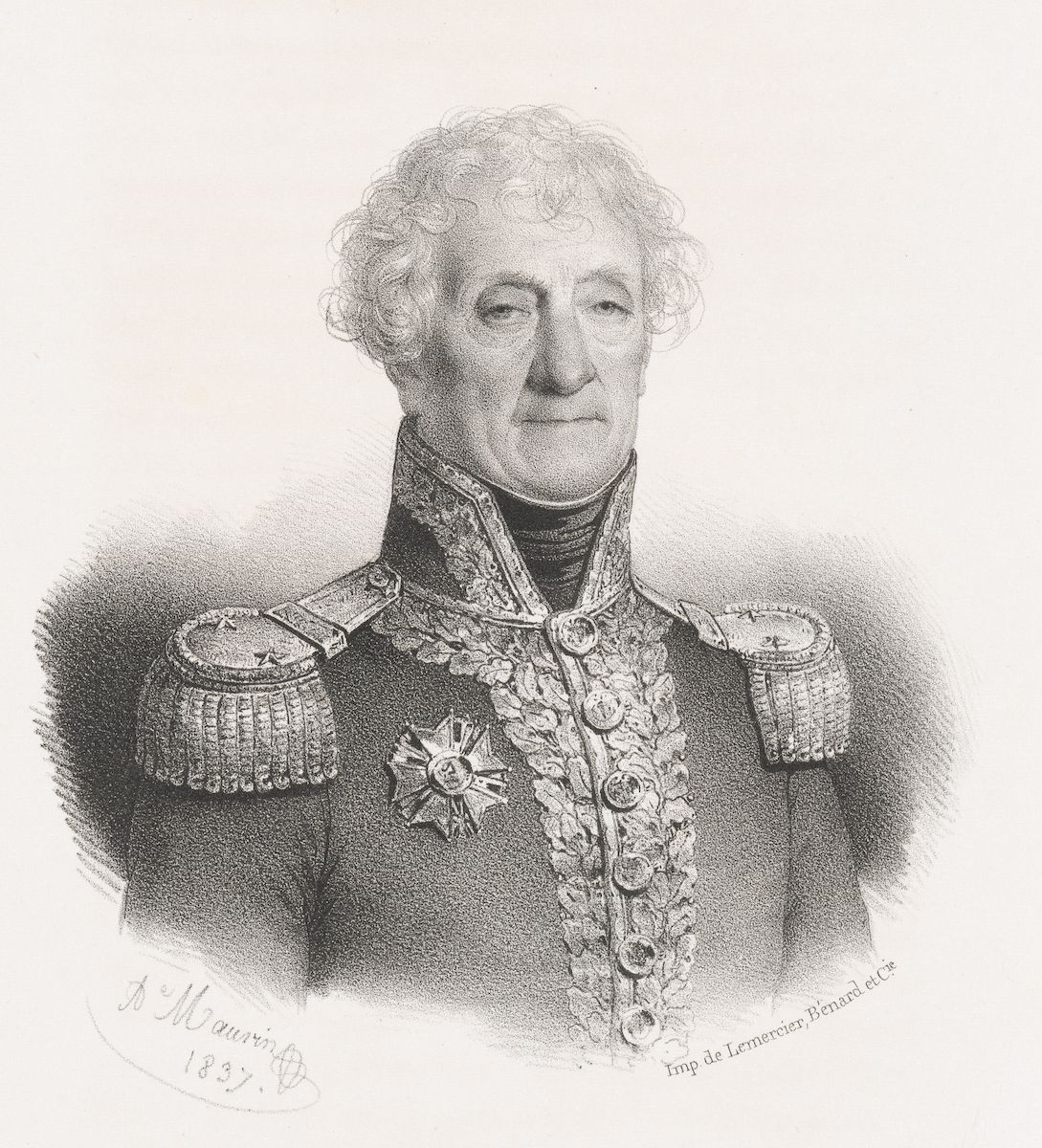
1837 lithograph of Hamelin

The French Indian Ocean colonies of Isle de France and Isle Bonaparte had been ideal positions from which French cruisers could raid the valuable trade routes from Britain to India since the start of the war in 1803. However, it was not until 1808 that the French authorities spared a significant force to operate from the region, providing a squadron of four frigates under Commodore Jacques Félix Emmanuel Hamelin. In 1809 and early 1810, these frigates operated with impunity along British trade routes, capturing seven valuable East Indiamen, a number of smaller merchant ships and several small warships. In response, the British admiral at the Cape of Good Hope, Albemarle Bertie, provided a small force of British warships to blockade the islands under Commodore Josias Rowley. Rowley knew that it would be almost impossible find and defeat the French ships out in the wider ocean with his limited resources, but he was able to limit French effectiveness by attacking their bases, raiding Saint Paul harbour in 1809 and capturing Isle Bonaparte in 1810, renaming it "Isle Bourbon".

In August 1810, a squadron of four of Rowley's frigates, making up the majority of the forces under his command and led by Captain Samuel Pym, were despatched to Isle de France to blockade Grand Port on the south-eastern coast. The arrival of a French squadron under Captain Guy-Victor Duperré on 20 August prompted Pym into ordering an inadequately planned attack on the harbour on 23 August and two of his vessels were wrecked on the reefs that protected the harbour entrance. Pym was unable to withdraw his remaining ships and the entire squadron was lost, leaving Rowley with only his flagship HMS Boadicea and two small brigs to conduct his campaign against six large French frigates. Urgent reinforcements were requested, as French ships under Captain Pierre Bouvet blockaded Isle Bourbon.

The first ship to arrive was HMS Africaine under the Captain Robert Corbet. In the action of 13 September 1810, Corbet engaged Bouvet's two frigates alone and was defeated, dying of his wounds shortly after the action. Rowley in Boadicea was able to recapture Africaine later in the day, but the frigate was severely damaged and unable to provide any reinforcement to the British squadron. Bouvet retired to Grand Port several days later for repairs, and thus was not on blockade duty on 17 September when HMS Ceylon arrived. Ceylon was an unusual ship, constructed by the Honourable East India Company (HEIC) in Bombay as an East Indiaman merchant ship designed to operate as a 32–gun frigate during wartime. In 1805 she was purchased by the British government and commissioned into the Royal Navy for service in the Indian Ocean. In 1810, her commander was Captain Charles Gordon, who had been ordered to sail to Rowley's aid when word of the losses suffered at Grand Port reached Madras. In his haste to depart, Gordon had been unable to obtain any Royal Marines, whose place was taken by 100 men of the 69th Regiment and the 86th Regiment from the Madras garrison. Also embarked was General John Abercromby and his staff, who were to lead a planned assault on Isle de France.

== Pursuit ==
Gordon arrived off Port Napoleon on 17 September, hoping to find Rowley maintaining the blockade off the port in Boadicea. Rowley was however off Isle Bourbon, sparring with Bouvet's frigates, and therefore Gordon only found Hamelin's squadron in the harbour. This force consisted of the frigates Vénus and Manche with the corvette Victor. Recognising that he was heavily outnumbered, Gordon sailed westwards towards Isle Bourbon to meet with Rowley and pass on the location of Hamelin's squadron. French lookouts on shore spotted Ceylon but mistook her for a troopship due to her unusual construction. The sighting was rapidly passed on to Hamelin, who immediately gave chase with Vénus and Victor.

At 14:00, Ceylon spotted Hamelin's ships in pursuit and her crew increased their efforts to escape, mistaking Victor, which carried three masts, for a larger ship and therefore considering themselves significantly outnumbered. As night fell, Gordon slowed Ceylon by shortening sail in the hope of meeting Vénus (which had outdistanced Victor) alone. However, the French flagship also slowed to allow the corvette to catch up and so Gordon increased sail once more, leading Hamelin southwest towards Isle Bourbon.

== Action ==
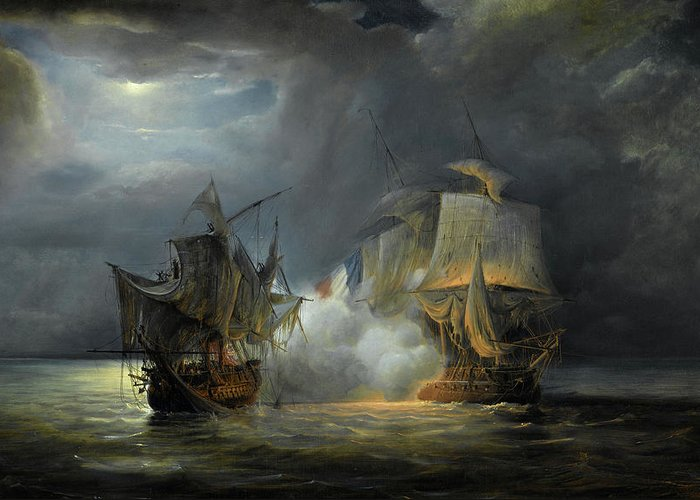
1835 painting of the engagement between Vénus and Ceylon

At 00:15 on the morning of 18 September, Vénus caught up with Ceylon, which began firing on the larger French frigate as she passed. Hamelin, recognising that his vessel had the advantage in size and weight of shot, did not wait for Victor but attacked immediately, passing Ceylon and turning across her bows to open a raking fire.

For an hour the frigates exchanged broadsides, until 01:15 when Hamelin, who had realised that he was fighting a warship not a troopship or East Indiaman, dropped back to effect repairs after suffering damage to his rigging. Ceylon was more severely damaged than the French ship and when Hamelin returned at 02:15, her repairs were not complete, preventing her escape. The engagement resumed, both frigates suffering serious damage in the second encounter. By 03:00, Vénus had lost her mizzenmast and two topmasts, while Ceylon had lost all of her topmasts, which had destroyed much of the ship's rigging as they fell. With both ships now unable to manoeuvre, the action continued at close range until 04:00, when Vénus was able to haul herself away to await the arrival of Victor.

The French corvette had been struggling to catch up during the night and did not arrive until dawn approached, revealing the flagship in a damaged state and the British vessel even more stricken. Sailing directly at Ceylon, the corvette was able to manoeuvre around the frigate and place herself in a raking position, from which her cannon could cause heavy damage and casualties to Ceylon without reply. Rather than have his ship destroyed, the wounded Gordon surrendered (although it is not clear whether Victor opened fire or not before the British surrender). Victor's men boarded Ceylon and Gordon and his officers, including Abercromby, were taken to Vénus as prisoners of war.

As dawn broke and visibility cleared, the sailors on Ceylon, Vénus and Victor realised that they were within sight of Saint Denis on Isle Bourbon, and thus vulnerable to counterattack from Rowley's flagship Boadicea. Despite hasty repairs, neither Ceylon nor Vénus were seaworthy by 07:30, when British lookouts on the island spotted the three ships and sent word to Rowley. Within ten minutes, Rowley was at sea, taking 50 volunteers from Africaine to augment his crew. Hamelin made desperate efforts to limp back to Isle de France, ordering Victor to tow Ceylon, but progress was slow and strong winds, which did not help the dismasted Ceylon and Vénus, repeatedly broke the tow rope.

During the day, Boadicea continued to close until Victor was forced to abandon Ceylon and sail in support of Vénus at 15:30. As soon as the French prize crew was removed, Lieutenant Philip Fitz Gibbon, the remaining officer on Ceylon, rehoisted British colours and assumed control of the ship. This allowed Boadicea to sail past the recaptured frigate and engage the French ships directly, reaching Vénus at 16:40. Hamelin recognised that the battered state of his flagship meant that he would not be able to adequately defend against Rowley's attack and ordered Victor to take news of his defeat back to Port Napoleon. Readying his ship for a token action, Hamelin fired at Boadicea as she came up but was forced to surrender within ten minutes.

== Aftermath ==
With the assistance of HMS Otter, which had followed Boadicea from Saint Denis, Rowley was able to return his prize and the battered Ceylon to Isle Bourbon without significant difficulty. British casualties had been relatively minor for such a difficult engagement, Ceylon suffering 10 men killed and 31 wounded and Boadicea just 2 wounded. French losses were also comparatively light, with only 9 dead and 15 wounded on Vénus and none at all on Victor. Rowley repaired Ceylon and restored Gordon in command. Vénus was also repaired, and entered British service as HMS Nereide to replace the Nereide lost at Grand Port. Nearly four decades later the engagement was among the actions recognised by the clasps "BOADICEA 18 SEPT. 1810", "OTTER 18 SEPT. 1810" and "STAUNCH 18 SEPT. 1810" attached to the Naval General Service Medal, awarded upon application to all British participants still living in 1847.

With the British squadron bolstered and the French commander and best frigate in British hands, the campaign stalemated. The French were no longer able to repair or maintain their ships due a lack of naval stores on Isle de France, and so remained in port and prepared for the inevitable invasion. Rowley meanwhile was busy preparing troops, stores and his squadron for the coming attack, which was led by Admiral Bertie in November 1810. The French squadron made no attempt to disrupt the invasion forces and were captured intact in their harbours. Bertie was credited with the final defeat of Isle de France and was made a baronet as reward for the successful campaign, sending Rowley back to Britain with despatches. A court martial, held on HMS Illustrious in the aftermath of the invasion cleared Gordon of any blame in the defeat of his ship, although historian William James criticised Gordon's assumption during the action that Victor was a French frigate rather than a much smaller corvette, and identified discrepancies between Gordon's published account and the ship's log.
