= HMS Plumper (1804) =

Brig of the Royal Navy

History

United Kingdom
- Name: HMS Plumper
- Ordered: 9 January 1804
- Builder: (John) Dudman & Co., Deptford
- Laid down: April 1804
- Launched: 7 September 1804
- Captured: 16 July 1805

France
- Name: Plumper
- Acquired: July 1805 by capture
- Commissioned: 30 August 1805
- Renamed: Argus (24 September 1814), Plumper (22 March 1815), and Argus (15 July 1815)
- Fate: Struck 1827

General characteristics
- Type: Archer-class gunbrig
- Tons burthen: 179 57/94 (bm)
- Length: 80 ft 1 in (24.4 m) (overall); 65 ft 11 1/2 in (20.1 m) (keel)
- Beam: 22 ft 6 in (6.9 m)
- Depth of hold: 9 ft 5 1/2 in (2.9 m)
- Sail plan: Brig
- Complement: 50
- Armament: 10 × 18-pounder carronades + 2 × 12-pounder chase guns

HMS Plumper was a later Archer-class gun-brig of the Royal Navy, launched in 1804. The French captured her in 1805 and took her into their Navy under her existing name. Between 1814 and 1815 her name alternated between Plumper and Argus, finally settling on Argus. As Argus she sailed to Senegal in 1816 in company with Méduse, whose shipwreck gave rise to a famous painting. In 1818 Argus was assigned to colonial service. She was condemned in October 1822 at Saint-Louis, Senegal, and struck in 1827.

== Royal Navy and capture ==
Plumper was commissioned in October 1804 under the command of Lieutenant James Henry Garrety.

In July 1805 Plumper, together with her sister-ship Teazer, were part of the Royal Navy force blockading the coast of northern France. On 15 July the two gun-brigs were off Granville, Manche when they became becalmed. To avoid the tide carrying them onto the coast, the two anchored in the afternoon off Chausey. A heavy fog came up and at 2:30 am on 16 July, several French vessels were seen to emerge from the darkness. Plumper attempted to get closer to Teazer so that they could support each other, but was unable to so. The French force, which consisted of six brigs, a schooner, and a ketch, stood off and battered Plumper with their guns. (Note: A later account gives the composition of the squadron as seven gunboats and a dogger.) Plumper returned fire, but being armed primarily with cannonades, was outranged. During the exchange of fire, Garrety had an arm shot off, a leg crippled by grapeshot, and a piece of langrange lacerated his chest. Four seamen were also wounded. After an hour, Sub-Lieutenant Richards, who had taken over command after Garrety had been taken below, struck. Later, some of Plumper's crew accused Richards of having too quickly surrendered. (Note: Garrety survived until 1827 and remained in the Royal Navy. On 5 February 1806 the Admiralty granted him a pension that at the time of his death was worth £200 per annum.)

After daybreak, the French also captured Teazer. They then took both their prizes into Granville, with Plumper being in a sinking state.

== French Navy ==
The French commissioned Plumper at Saint-Servan on 30 August 1805. Between 1814 and 1815 Plumper underwent several name changes, ultimately becoming Argus.

On 17 June 1816, Méduse departed Rochefort, accompanied by the storeship Loire, Argus, and the corvette Écho, to receive the British handover of the port of Saint-Louis, Senegal. Méduse, armed en flûte, carried passengers, including the appointed French governor of Senegal and his wife. The Méduse's complement totaled 400, including 160 crew. She reached Madeira on 27 June. The vessels separated and on 2 July Méduse grounded. There were too few boats to take off everyone on board, so 146 men and one woman took to a hastily built raft. By the time Argus by chance found the raft on 17 July, only 15 men survived. Argus then took the survivors to Saint-Louis. The story of the raft became the subject of an important painting: The Raft of the Medusa.

From 19 June until November 1818, Argus, under the command of capitaine de frėgate Peureux de Mélay, carried dispatches and passengers from Lorient to Saint-Louis. There she was assigned to colonial service. She went to the Kingdom of Galam to re-occupy Fort St Joseph, about 200km up the Senegal River and on the way to Bakel. (Note: Fort St. Joseph has fallen into ruins, and today lies within the district of Makhana, in Mali.) From there she conducted expeditions together with the aviso Colibri and the colonial brig Postillion. Between 31 October 1818 and 3 September 1819 she was under the command of lieutenant de vaisseau Dupont.

== Fate ==
She was condemned in October 1822 at Saint-Louis, Senegal, and struck in 1827.
