= William Augustus Montagu =

Officer in the british royal navy

Vice-Admiral Sir William Augustus Montagu KCH CB
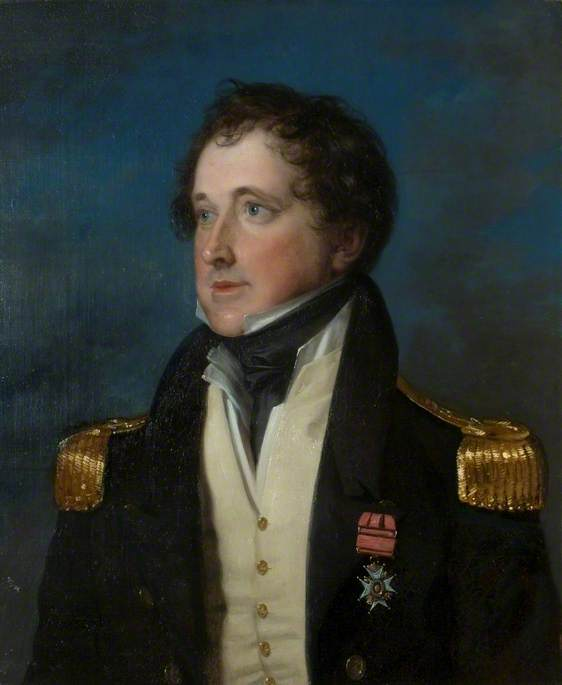
- Admiral Sir William Montagu, attributed to Henry Richard Graves
- Born: 4 December 1785
- Died: 6 March 1852; Ryde, Isle of Wight, Hampshire, England
- Military career
- Allegiance: United Kingdom
- Branch: Royal Navy
- Service years: 1796 to 1852
- Rank: Royal Navy Vice-Admiral
- Conflicts: French Revolutionary Wars; Battle of Camperdown; Napoleonic Wars; Invasion of Île de France
- Awards: Knight Commander of the Royal Guelphic Order, Knight Bachelor, Companion of the Order of the Bath

Vice-Admiral Sir William Augustus Montagu KCH CB (4 December 1785 – 6 March 1852) was a senior officer of the British Royal Navy during the French Revolutionary and Napoleonic Wars who served in a number of sea battles and was also in command of the naval brigade in the brief land campaign to capture Île de France in 1810. During his service he was present at the capture of numerous French frigates and later served in the War of 1812. After the end of the Napoleonic Wars he remained in service and commanded several ships in the Mediterranean before he retired from active service in 1837. He remained a commissioned officer and later rose through the ranks to become a vice-admiral. For his services he was knighted in the Royal Guelphic Order and made a Companion of the Order of the Bath.

== Family background ==
Born in 1785, William Augustus Montagu was an illegitimate son of John Montagu, 5th Earl of Sandwich, by Maria. He was baptised at St Anne's Church, Soho, Westminster. William is thought to be named after his uncle, William Augustus, who died at Lisbon in 1776. His grandfather was John Montagu, 4th Earl of Sandwich, who served three non-consecutive terms as the First Lord of the Admiralty, to 1783.

== Military and parliamentary service, and awards ==
Montagu joined the army young, going to sea aged 11 in 1796 as a volunteer on HMS Glatton commanded by Captain Henry Trollope. Montagu remained with Trollope when he moved, first to HMS Russell in which Montagu saw action at the Battle of Camperdown and subsequently HMS Juste. In late 1800, Montagu was commissioned as a midshipman and joined the frigate HMS Sirius. In Sirius he was present at the capture of Dédaigneuse and then moved into the brig HMS Dasher for four years, spent in the West Indies. In 1804 Montagu returned to Europe as a lieutenant and the following year was promoted to commander.

In 1807, Montagu became a post captain and took command of the small frigate HMS Terpsichore in the Indian Ocean. In March 1808, Terpsichore was attacked by the larger French vessel Sémillante and despite heavy losses, Montagu was able to outfight his opponent although he could not capture her. Soon afterward Montagu moved to HMS Cornwallis and served in the East Indies, forming part of the squadron that captured Amboyna from the Dutch and seized two Dutch frigates in the harbour. By 1810, Montagu was established in the Indian Ocean and was selected from the captains assembled for the Invasion of Île de France to lead the naval brigade, a force of sailors and Royal Marines deployed on shore to support the British Army forces leading the attack. During the assault Montagu fought well and was commended after his brigade assisted in breaking the French resistance around the capital Port Napoleon.

In September 1812, Montagu returned to Europe to command HMS Niobe in the Channel Fleet, later serving off the United States during the War of 1812 and in Portuguese waters. In June 1814, with the war coming to an end, Niobe was paid off and Montagu was in reserve until 1819, when he took command of HMS Phaeton in Halifax, Nova Scotia. Between 1818 and 1820 he sat in Parliament for Huntingdon. In 1822, Phaeton was paid off and Montagu was in reserve until 1834, marrying Anne Leeds, daughter of Sir George William Leeds in 1823. Montagu took command of HMS Malabar in 1834 and remained in her until 1837 in the Mediterranean. This was his final commission and when he was placed in reserve again in 1837 he did not return to the sea. He remained in the Navy however and slowly rose through the ranks, becoming a rear-admiral in 1841 and a vice admiral in 1851.

Montagu was knighted in 1830 in the Royal Guelphic Order and in 1832 became a Knight Commander, accompanied by a Knight Bachelor award for use in Britain. He had previously been made a Companion of the Order of the Bath in 1815 at the end of the war. He died at Ryde, on the Isle of Wight in March 1852.

== See also ==
- O'Byrne, William Richard (1849). "Montagu, William Augustus" . A Naval Biographical Dictionary . John Murray – via Wikisource.

Parliament of the United Kingdom
| Preceded by John Calvert; Samuel Farmer | Member of Parliament for Huntingdon; 1818–1820; With: John Calvert | Succeeded by John Calvert; John Kerr |
