= HMS Cornelia =

Frigate of the Royal Navy

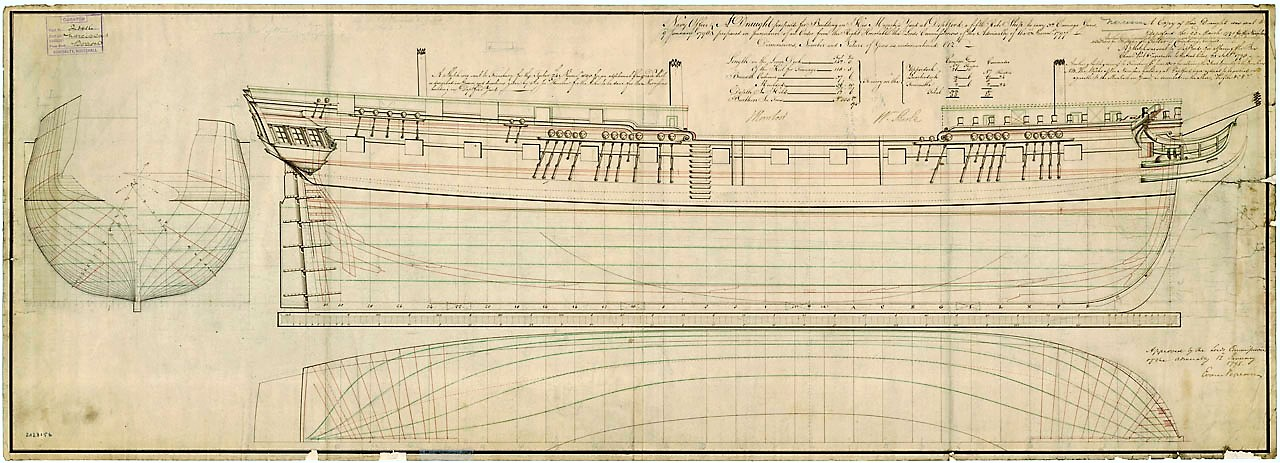
- Plan of Cornelia

History

United Kingdom
- Name: HMS Cornelia
- Ordered: 10 June 1805
- Builder: Simon Temple, South Shields
- Laid down: May 1806
- Launched: 28 July 1808
- Commissioned: 1808
- Out of service: 1814
- Honours and awards: Naval General Service Medal (NGSM) with clasp "Java"
- Fate: Broken up 1814

General characteristics
- Class & type: Narcissus-class frigate
- Tons burthen: 90890/94 (bm)
- Length: Overall:142 ft 5 3/4 in (43.4 m); Keel:118 ft 11 1/8 in (36.2 m)
- Beam: 37 ft 10 7/8 in (11.6 m)
- Depth of hold: 12 ft 6 in (3.8 m)
- Complement: 254
- Armament: Upper deck:26 × 18-pounder guns; QD:2 × 9-pounder guns + 8 × 24-pounder carronades; Fc:2 × 9-pounder guns + 2 × 24-pounder carronades

HMS Cornelia was a Royal Navy 32-gun fifth-rate Narcissus-class frigate, launched in 1808 at South Shields. She participated in the Invasion of Ile de France in 1810 and the invasion of Java in 1811. She was broken up in 1814.

== Career ==
Cornelia commissioned in November 1808, under the command of Captain Henry Folkes Edgell. He sailed her for the East Indies on 30 December.

In 1810 was deployed to the squadron at the Cape of Good Hope. In the autumn, she joined the invasion fleet under Admiral Albemarle Bertie that executed the successful Invasion of Ile de France in November 1810.

On 13 May 1810 Cornelia was in company with Sir Francis Drake and HMS Diana when they captured some slaves at Diego Garcia. (Note: A first-class share of the bounty money was worth £299 11s 4d; a sixth-class share, that of an ordinary seaman, was worth £3 1s 0 3/4d.)

In August or September 1811 Captain William Fitzwilliam Owen replaced Edgell. Owen commanded Cornelia during the invasion of the Dutch East Indies in 1811, and the capture of Java that year. In 1847 the Admiralty awarded the NGSM with clasp "Java" to all surviving claimants from the campaign.

In 1813, Cornelia returned to England as escort to a convoy from China.

== Fate ==
Cornelia was paid off at Woolwich in 1813 placed in ordinary. She was broken up at Sheerness in June 1814.
