= William O'Bryen Drury =

Vice-Admiral William O'Brien Drury
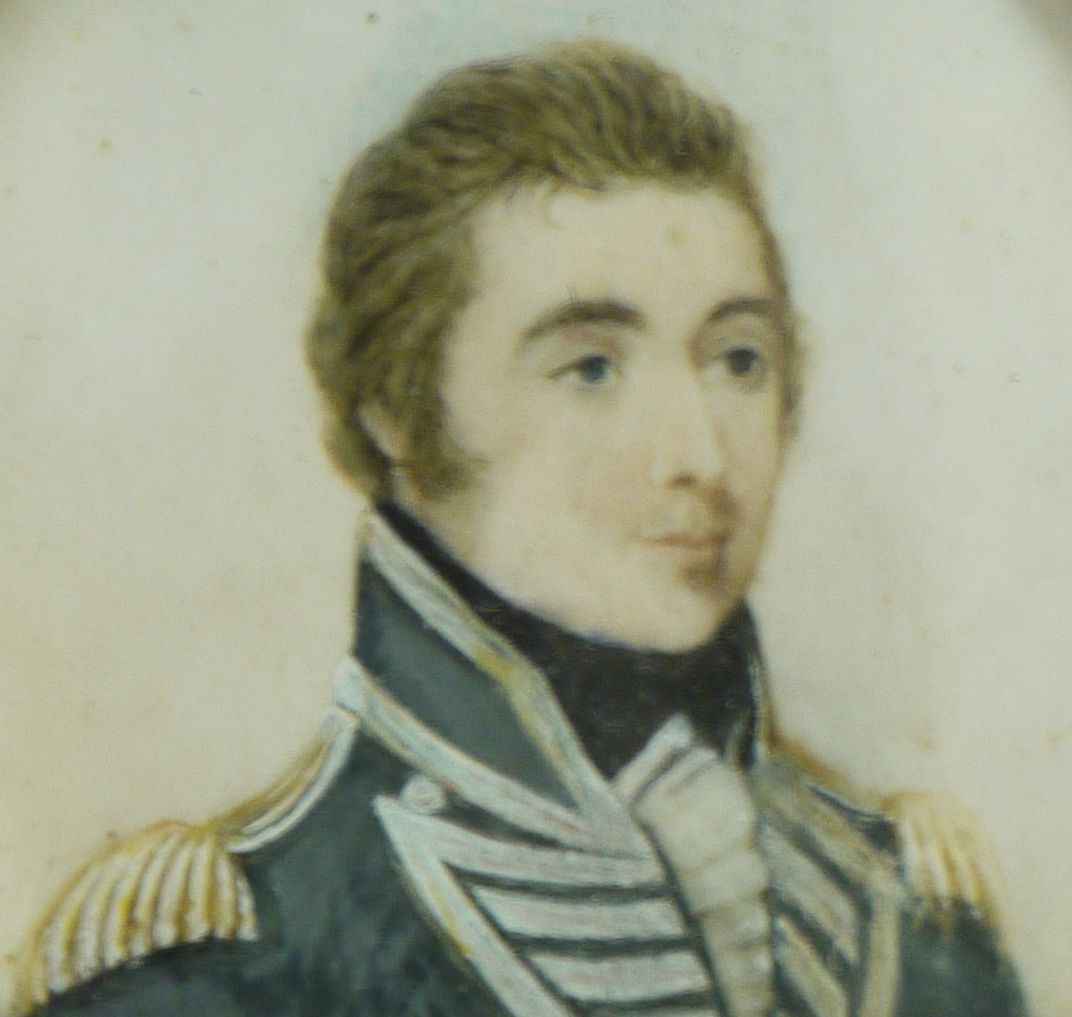
- Miniature portrait of Drury
- Born: 1754
- Died: 6 March 1811 (aged 56–57) Madras
- Allegiance: Great Britain; United Kingdom
- Branch: Royal Navy
- Rank: Vice-Admiral
- Commands: HMS Tickler; HMS Squirrel; HMS Trusty; HMS Powerful; HMS Neptune; East Indies Station
- Conflicts: American Revolutionary War; French Revolutionary Wars; Battle of Camperdown; Napoleonic Wars; Invasion of Île de France

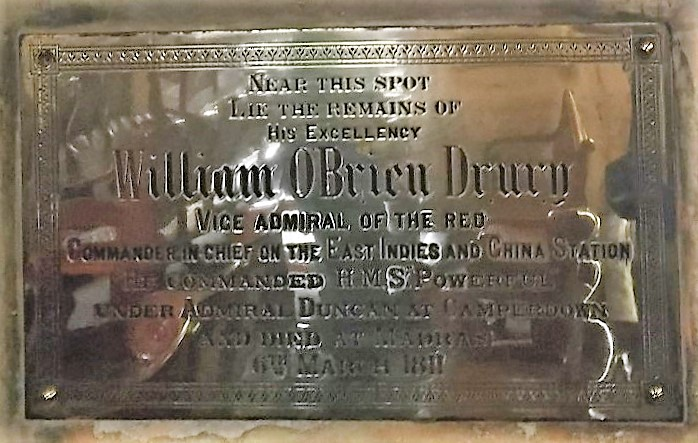
Memorial of William O'Brien Drury, St. Mary's Church, Madras

Vice-Admiral William O'Brien Drury (1754 – 6 March 1811) was a Royal Navy officer who served in the French Revolutionary and Napoleonic Wars. He was born in County Cork, Ireland to Edward Drury (1722–1785) and Ann Drury née Maule. His nephew was homeopathic pioneer Edward Cronin.

== Naval career ==
Drury served as commander of the ship of the line HMS Powerful during the French Revolutionary Wars, during which he was heavily engaged at the Battle of Camperdown, at which a Dutch fleet was destroyed in 1797.

Drury was promoted to Rear-Admiral of the Blue in April 1804, and appointed as second-in-command of the Irish station on 17 December. He was promoted to Rear-Admiral of the White in November 1805, and Rear-Admiral of the Red in April 1808. In July 1810 he was finally promoted to Vice-Admiral of the Blue.

Drury was appointed as commander of the East Indies Station in September 1807, after his predecessor Sir Thomas Troubridge had been lost at sea sailing from India to the Cape of Good Hope. He sailed later that month aboard HMS Monmouth with a convoy to India. The convoy arrived off Tranquebar (modern Tharangambadi) just as British troops were being landed to occupy the Danish colony there. Drury then landed at Madras (modern Chennai) in February 1808, to take up his command. The following month he transferred his flag to HMS Russell and escorted a convoy up the coast to Calcutta (modern Kolkata), returning in June.

In 1808 he commanded an expedition to occupy Macao a Portuguese colony; Portugal, a British ally, had recently been occupied by France. The fleet arrived in September 1808 and a detachment of troops were landed, but a lack of support from the Portuguese authorities and strong resistance from the Chinese government meant that the force was withdrawn before it caused a diplomatic crisis between Britain and China.

Drury's command in the East Indies overlapped with that of Albemarle Bertie at the Cape of Good Hope and the two engaged in numerous political struggles, even appointing separate officers to command the same ships to spite one another. In November 1810, Drury was ordered to provide Bertie with a fleet of small transport ships for the Invasion of Île de France, which he accompanied and insisted on command despite orders not to infringe on Bertie's command of the operation. When Bertie was subsequently made a baronet as a reward for the successful conclusion of this operation Drury complained at length about Bertie to the Admiralty. Bertie demanded a court martial on his behaviour, which was dismissed by the Admiralty, who were becoming irritated by Drury and Bertie's squabbling. The issue remained unresolved at Drury's sudden death on 6 March 1811 on station in India.

== Family ==
In 1783. Drury married Letitia Preston Vallancey, daughter of General Charles Vallancey, [1726-1812] military surveyor and antiquary. Together were the parents of 7 daughters.

Military offices
Preceded by Edward Pellew (jointly with Thomas Troubridge)	Commander-in-Chief, East Indies Station; 1809–1811	Succeeded by Samuel Hood
