= The Mauritius Command =

1977 novel by Patrick O'Brian

- First edition
- Author: Patrick O'Brian
- Language: English
- Series: Aubrey-Maturin series
- Genre: Historical novel
- Publisher: Collins (UK)
- Publication date: 1977
- Publication place: United Kingdom
- Media type: Print (Hardback & Paperback) & Audio Book (Cassette, CD)
- Pages: 294 Hardback edition & 268 Paperback edition
- ISBN: 0-00-222383-X First edition hardback
- OCLC: 3426756
- Dewey Decimal: 823/.9/14
- LC Class: PR6029.B55 M38 1977
- Preceded by: HMS Surprise
- Followed by: Desolation Island

The Mauritius Command is the fourth naval historical novel in the Aubrey-Maturin series by Patrick O'Brian, first published in 1977.

Aubrey is married and the father of twin girls, owner of a cottage with a fine observatory he built. He is more than ready to be back at sea. He and Stephen Maturin join a convoy charged with taking two strategic islands in the Indian Ocean from the French. The mission provides scope for each man to advance in his specialty.

A review written at first publication found the novel to be written in "language deep with detail and the poetry of fact", appreciating the period detail. A later review, written at the reissue, finds the author a graceful writer but sees a difficulty with the novel's structure, building to climaxes that do not occur. Others writing at that time saw the novel more as part of the longer series, with humour, erudition and "impeccable period detail".

== Plot summary ==
Four years after the events of HMS Surprise, Jack Aubrey and Sophia Williams are married and the parents of twin girls. They live at Ashgrove Cottage on his half-pay, which is not enough to support fellow navy men in the household. Sophia's mother has lost her money, including Sophia's portion, and now lives with them, along with Sophia's niece Cecelia.

When Stephen Maturin comes to call, Jack admits to him that as much as he loves his family he is eager to return to sea again. Stephen mentions that he has recommended Jack to lead a new secret commission being planned by the Admiralty. Moments later, a courier delivers Aubrey's orders from the port Admiral. Jack is given command of the 38-gun frigate HMS Boadicea and requested to depart immediately for Plymouth, where he picks up Mr R T Farquhar, a diplomat, and receives further orders to sail to the British station at Cape Town, where the ships of a convoy destined for the Indian Ocean will meet. Not long after embarking, they meet the French ship Hébé escorting a captured merchant ship. The Boadicea captures both ships, and Jack sends the prizes to Gibraltar. The timely capture gives Boadicea the opportunity to send letters home, and the ship gains a French cook and the Hébé's English prisoners, all able seamen. The long journey south through the Atlantic gives Jack time to bring the crew of the Boadicea up to his standards of efficiency in gunnery and gives Maturin and Farquhar time to develop their political strategies.

At Cape Town, Aubrey meets Admiral Bertie, who confirms Aubrey's elevation to Commodore and authorises him to hoist his broad pendant ('broad pennant' in some editions) as commander of a small fleet with formal orders to disrupt French interests in the Indian Ocean and ultimately to capture the French-held islands of Mauritius and La Réunion. British stations in the region are short of ships and men, leaving the expedition poorly matched against the local French forces. Jack's subordinate captains include Lord Clonfert of the Otter, an insecure Englishman with an Irish title; Captain Corbett of the Néréide, whose reputation for excessive flogging has left his ship severely undermanned; and Captain Pym of the Sirius. Jack learns that his loyal coxswain Bonden and steward Killick sailed from the West Indies under Corbett, so he trades men with Néréide to bring them aboard Boadicea. Bertie advises Aubrey that none of his captains are on good terms with each other.

For the first 2,000 miles of the voyage to the islands, Jack switches his pendant to the elderly 64-gun ship of the line HMS Raisonnable. The Caroline is taken and renamed HMS Bourbonnaise, and Corbett sails her with despatches to Cape Town and England. The rest of the convoy returns to Cape Town. Jack shifts back to Boadicea and sails again upon hearing that more merchant ships have been taken by the French. The convoy is caught in a major tropical cyclone, whence it sails back to Cape Town for repairs, receiving the first mail in many months; Sophia's letters are water-damaged, and Jack tries to make sense of them.

Aubrey organizes an attack on La Réunion with help from the active and decisive Lieutenant Colonel Harry Keating and his army regulars stationed on Rodrigues. La Réunion capitulates almost without loss after simultaneous landings by army troops and sepoys from the British East India Company on both sides of the island. The occupation is made easier by Stephen's propaganda and political meetings, which help to convince many of the disaffected locals to accept British rule and Farquhar as interim governor.

Mauritius proves more challenging. Stephen is seriously injured in an accident boarding Néréide, now under Lord Clonfert, which is part of the force sent to capture the strategic Île de la Passe off the island's southeast coast. While recuperating, Stephen and the ship's doctor, McAdam, attempt to diagnose Clonfert, whose self-consciousness and perceived rivalry with Commodore Aubrey has greatly affected his behavior. The capture of the fortress on Île de la Passe is successful, and Stephen is put down on Mauritius to continue his work. A small group of transports under the command of Captain Pym puts soldiers on Mauritius to garrison the fortress. The French fleet then appears with three frigates, Bellone, Minerve, and Victor, and two captured Indiamen, Ceylon and Windham. They boldly attack the fort and then sail into the channel leading to Port Southeast; the British ships are caught unprepared but decide to attack. The battle rages for days with heavy casualties, and in the end two British ships, Sirius and Magicienne, run aground in the shallow channel and cannot be heaved off, so are burnt to prevent their capture; Iphigenia and the fort at Île de la Passe are abandoned to be retaken by the French. Néréide is also captured and Clonfert is gravely wounded in the neck and head by a splinter. A messenger vessel, with Maturin aboard, reaches La Réunion to inform Aubrey of the losses and the failed attack on Port Southeast.

Boadicea sails through the night to Île de la Passe only to find it under French control, then chases Manche and Vénus in a vain attempt to separate them. After contacting Tom Pullings, who has moved the guns of Windham aboard Emma, Jack believes his fortunes have changed. Captain Corbett re-joins at Saint Denis in command of HMS Africaine. Chasing the French during the night, Africaine clashes with the Astrée and the captured Iphigenia. The encounter goes badly, and Corbett is mortally wounded during the fight, possibly by his own oppressed men. The French capture the Africaine, but leave it dismasted when the Boadicea bears down on them; Astrée refuses an engagement. Joined by the Otter and Staunch, the flotilla returns to La Réunion where the Commodore hastens to refit Africaine.

Maturin and Bonden return from Mauritius with news that HMS Bombay is nearby, in a running fight with both the French Vénus and Victor. The Boadicea engages the French ships, with Jack making use of eager volunteers from the Africaine to board and capture Bombay and Vénus. During the encounter the French Commodore, Hamelin, is killed. While waiting for repairs, Aubrey and Keating devise a plan to finish the battle with the remaining French frigates. Suddenly the Emma signals the Boadicea that many other British sails are on the horizon, and Jack realizes Admiral Bertie has arrived to supersede his command. Tom Pullings comes aboard with a copy of the Naval Gazette announcing the birth of a son to Sophia; Jack is ecstatic at the news. He then opens Bertie's letter ordering him to join the fleet at Rodrigues, where he will command HMS Illustrious, and the Army led by General Abercrombie. Jack is disappointed that he will no longer have the honor of leading the fleet, but accepts the orders with magnanimity, to Bertie's surprise. The final invasion of Mauritius, based on Aubrey and Keating's original plan, is an overwhelming victory, and the French surrender after being given honourable terms.

Stephen learns from McAdam that Clonfert, at the military hospital in Port Louis, has committed suicide by removing his bandages, unable to face Jack Aubrey. Stephen asks McAdam's advice on how to overcome his own recent disaffection and apathy, and McAdam insists that only romantic relationships seem to consistently remedy such maladies. A ceremonial dinner is given at Government House on Mauritius. Stephen implies in conversation with Mr Peter that Jack's father, General Aubrey, is soon to have significant influence with the Admiralty in London, which rumours are believed by Bertie. The Admiral gives Jack the great honour of returning to England carrying the news of the British victory.

== Characters ==
In England

- Jack Aubrey: Captain in the Royal Navy. Given command of HMS Boadicea, he is appointed commodore of a fleet intended to capture Mauritius and La Réunion during the story.
- Stephen Maturin: Ship's surgeon, natural philosopher, intelligence agent, and friend to Jack.
- Sophia Aubrey: Jack's wife, his true love, and the mother of his children.
- Charlotte and Fanny: Jack and Sophie's twin infant daughters, perhaps six months old at the beginning of the story.
- Baby boy Aubrey: Son born to Sophia while Jack is on assignment, news which is reported in the Naval Gazette.
- Cecelia: Young daughter of Mrs William's middle daughter, and niece of Sophie and Jack, living with them at Ashgrove Cottage.
- Mrs Williams: Jack Aubrey's mother-in-law, now bankrupt and living with her daughter at Ashgrove Cottage.
- Bessie: Cook at Ashgrove Cottage until Mrs Williams abruptly dismisses her without a good word, for touching the mushrooms carefully collected as a gift to the Aubreys by Maturin, a man unknown to her.
- Lady Clonfert: Wife of Captain Lord Clonfert, seeking passage to join him at the Cape.

At the Cape

- Robert Townsend Farquhar, Esquire: Temporary governor of La Réunion, trained in the law, skilled in politics, no ear for music, good chess player. He is R T Farquhar when picked up at Plymouth, but oddly William Farquhar, Governor-designate, in Admiral Bertie's orders to Aubrey.
- Mr Lemuel Akers: First lieutenant in HMS Boadicea, detached to sail HMS Hyaena to Gibraltar.
- Mr Seymour: Second lieutenant in HMS Boadicea, acting first lieutenant after Akers parts company.
- Mr Trollope: Third lieutenant in HMS Boadicea, acting second after Akers parts company.
- Mr Johnson: Master's mate in HMS Boadicea, acting lieutenant after Akers parts company, appointment confirmed at Cape Town.
- Mr Richardson: Midshipman in Boadicea, nicknamed Spotted Dick, skilled in mathematics, partner to Aubrey in navigation. Later he takes the aviso Pearl to Rodrigues island.
- Mr Buchan: Master in HMS Boadicea who is killed by cannon fire from the French ship Astrée.
- Mr John Fellowes: Bosun of the Boadicea.
- Admiral Bertie: Admiral in Simon's Town, the Cape Town station of the Royal Navy, with an eye to financial gain and baronetcy.
- Mr Peter: Secretary to Aubrey, from Simon's Town. He serves as Admiral Bertie's informant within the squadron, as Maturin quickly realizes. Maturin eventually uses this to his and Aubrey's advantage.
- William McAdam: Surgeon in HMS Néréide and a specialist in diseases of the mind, knows Clonfert and knew his father as well.
- Golovnin: Russian fleet lieutenant, captain of sloop Diana caught at Cape Town when Russia briefly allied with France (thus becoming an enemy to England), slipped away without harm.
- Barret Bonden: Jack Aubrey's coxswain, who joins him at Cape Town.
- Preserved Killick: Jack Aubrey's steward, who joins him at Cape Town.

At La Réunion and Mauritius

- Lieutenant Colonel Harry Keating: British army commander of the 56th Regiment of Foot, leader of all army and sepoy units.
- Colonel Fraser: British army officer leading a brigade in the attack on La Réunion, arrives on the Sirius.
- Colonel McLeod: British army officer leading a brigade in the attack on La Réunion, arrives on the Boadicea.
- Colonel Saint-Susanne: French army commander on La Réunion, surrenders the island on terms.
- Mr Satterly: Master in HMS Néréide.
- Mr Webber: Second lieutenant in HMS Néréide.
- Hamelin: French commodore leading the defense of Mauritius and La Réunion, based in the Vénus.
- Duvallier: French commander in Port South East.
- General Abercrombie: Commander of the invasion army, takes command over Keating.

Squadron leaders

- Captain Pym: captain of HMS Sirius.
- Lord Clonfert: Commander of HMS Otter and then post-captain in HMS Néréide.
- Mr Tomkinson: Lieutenant in HMS Otter who is made Master and Commander of Otter upon the promotion of Clonfert to Néréide.
- Captain Corbett: Captain of HMS Néréide and later HMS Africaine.
- Captain Eliot: Captain in HMS Boadicea while Aubrey sails in HMS Raisonnable.
- Captain Lambert: Captain of HMS Iphigenia.
- Captain Lucius Curtis: Captain of HMS Magicienne, joins the convoy after chasing Vénus, which took more merchant ships.
- Lord Narborough (Garron): Captain of HMS Staunch, arrives during La Réunion action, was remembered as third in the Surprise (in prior novel HMS Surprise), though he was actually third in the Lively, the voyage afterward.
- Mr Tom Pullings: Lieutenant formerly serving under Aubrey, enters the action as captain of the troop ship Groper, then of Emma. He is now the father of a son, John.
- Mr Fortescue: Captain of the schooner Wasp and a man fond of birds, spent a long time with the albatross, shares specimens with Maturin after carrying him ashore on La Réunion.

== Ships ==
=== British ===
- HMS Boadicea
- HMS Raisonnable – ship of the line
- HMS Sirius *
- HMS Néréide *
- HM Sloop Otter *
- HMS Magicienne*
- HMS Staunch * – brig
- HMS Iphigenia *
- HMS Africaine *
- HMS Bombay *
- Windham * – Indiaman used as a transport once recaptured
- Kite – transport
- Solebay – transport
- Groper – transport
- Emma – transport
- HMS Leopard *
- Wasp – schooner
- HMS Illustrious *

=== French ===
- Caroline * – frigate
- Bellone * – frigate
- Minerve * – frigate
- Victor * – corvette
- Ceylan * – captured British Indiaman
- Windham * – captured British Indiaman
- Vénus * – frigate
- Manche * – frigate
- Astrée * – frigate
- Hébé is the former HMS Hyaena (taken in the Atlantic)

* N.B. were real ships during the period depicted.

== Major themes ==
The novel gives further scope to Maturin's role as both a secret agent (in which he uses propaganda effectively to support the British campaign) and as a naturalist (in which he is seen collecting relics of the extinct dodo and solitaire), while Aubrey for the first time experiences naval battles as the "looker-on" while others are directly in the fight. Aubrey makes strategic decisions and knows the timing of when to act, but must learn how to manage other captains, not only the crew directly reporting to him. One theme is the contrast between Aubrey's development in his career and acceptance of what comes, to the insecurity of Clonfert, also a skilled seaman, who had been with him in the West Indies when neither had been "given his step" to commander or captain.

Walton comments that "The most interesting thing about this volume is Lord Clonfert, an Irish peer who feels the need to outdo everyone—his surgeon says at one point that if Jack is the dashing frigate captain, Clonfert has to be the dashing frigate captain to the power of ten. He’s ridiculous, he lies, but he is brave and does know the waters. And for once we hear Stephen and Jack discuss him, because he’s not a shipmate so Stephen doesn’t feel like an informer talking about him. He’s a psychological curiosity without any doubt, and O’Brian does him very well. There’s also the flogging Captain Corbett—so among his little fleet there’s one dandy and one tartar, and Jack has to try to manage them diplomatically."

== Allusions to history ==
The military actions of the novel are very closely based upon the real-life Mauritius campaign of 1809–1811, carried out by the Royal Navy under Commodore Josias Rowley with the assistance of army forces under Harry Keating. O'Brian notes this in the preface. Réunion (known to the French as Île Bourbon or Île Buonaparte) was taken completely in July 1810, and Mauritius (known as Île de France, earlier called Mauritius by the Dutch) was formally captured on 3 December 1810. Many of the historical figures involved in the campaign are characters in the novel.

O'Brian used literary license in making Aubrey a Commodore while still a relatively junior captain, which puts him equal in rank to the man who actually led the squadron in history, Commodore Rowley. In the novel, Aubrey is appointed directly by the Admiralty thanks to Maturin's persuasion, as Maturin had been at work on the intelligence side of the project. There are other differences from the historical events, one being that the French captain of the Vénus, Jacques Félix Emmanuel Hamelin, was not killed in action and actually survived the encounter, surrendering to the British and going on to honor in France. In contrast, Captain Corbett's reputation and death aboard ship match that of Robert Corbet, who was captain of Néréide and then given the Africaine when he brought the captured Caroline to England. Corbet was killed under controversial circumstances during the action of 13 September 1810, which is depicted accurately in the novel.

Lord Clonfert is fictional, in place of Nesbit Willoughby, who was captain of the actual HMS Néréide; though Willoughby had a spotty career and took many wounds, he survived the battle and lived unmarried. Lord Clonfert takes the same splinter wound to the eye as Willoughby received during the Battle of Grand Port in August 1810. In the historical battle, Samuel Pym of the Sirius was taken prisoner by the French and released only when a later squadron from Cape Town re-took Île de la Passe in December 1810, freeing Pym and others taken prisoner. For the loss of his ship, Pym faced the usual court-martial but was exonerated of blame. In the novel, it is Captain Lord Clonfert who is left a prisoner in the action, seriously wounded, under the care of his own and French physicians until the squadron arrives under Admiral Bertie to accept the island's capitulation, though Clonfert does not live to face a court-martial.

The ending of the novel, with Admiral Bertie sailing in and taking credit, also matches the historical event, as Bertie did in fact lead the victorious squadron in December 1810. Some historians have viewed the defeat at Grand Port as the most serious to the Royal Navy in all of the Napoleonic Wars; the interim defeat and very real loss of ships were overshadowed, however, by the conquest of the islands just a few months later. The French mark this victory on the Arc de Triomphe in Paris, the only naval action noted there. Though Aubrey expects no baronetcy for his accomplishments in the novel, in history, both Admiral Bertie and Commodore Rowley received a baronetcy in recognition of their success in a popular military campaign.

Historically a commodore indicated on which ship in his squadron he was sailing by showing his broad pendant (some editions have 'broad pennant').

It is mentioned in the novel that Aubrey makes the acquaintance at the Royal Society of Miss Caroline Herschel, famed astronomer and sister to William Herschel, and that she aided him in the technique of polishing the lens for his telescope. She was in her sixties during the time period depicted in the novel. In his development as a scientific sailor, Aubrey had presented a paper on his method for improving navigation by tracking the planets.

The island now called Réunion (French La Réunion) had several names in this era, including Île Bourbon and Île Buonaparte, reflecting the opposing sides in France. Bourbon was the name of the royal family deposed by the French Revolution and a way to refer to the royalists among the French; Napoleon Bonaparte was the emperor of the expanding French Empire. The French ship Caroline was rechristened as HMS Bourbonnaise, both because there was already a ship named Caroline in the Royal Navy, and the island where she was taken had that as one of its names.

The story of the Russian Captain Golovnin aboard the ship Diana, caught at a British port when the national alliances changed while he was sailing, refers to an historical situation which occurred in the same year that the squadron to take the two French islands was assembled.

== Allusions to literature ==
The story contains numerous allusions to the ideas and thinking of others. At one point Aubrey is recorded "adding, not without pride, Ex Africa surgit semper aliquid novo, – novi, eh?" ("Always something new coming out of Africa".) This is the popular version of a quotation from Pliny the Elder, "unde etiam vulgare Graeciae dictum semper aliquid novi Africam adferre". Later, Maturin quotes the Earl of Rochester, "Every man would be a coward if he durst" (which he would have seen in Samuel Johnson's Lives of the Most Eminent English Poets). Throughout the novel there are many other allusions and quotes, including some credited to Alexander Pope, Pliny the Elder, Samuel Johnson, Horace, Lewis Carroll, and from King Lear by Shakespeare.

== Literary significance and criticism ==
T. J. Binyon writes "Taken together, the novels are a brilliant achievement. They display staggering erudition on almost all aspects of early nineteenth century life, with impeccable period detail....[Compared to Forester's characters] Aubrey and Maturin are subtler, richer items; in addition Patrick O'Brian has a gift for the comic which Forester lacks.

"Jack's assignment: to capture the Indian Ocean islands of Réunion and Mauritius from the French. That campaign forms the narrative thread of this rollicking sea saga. But its substance is more beguiling still..." —Elizabeth Peer, Newsweek

Kirkus Reviews found the language of the novel to be "shot through with unobtrusive culture and period texture that flows like a serenade". The characters are drawn well, with "a crazy inner skip to their hearts", summing up the writing as having "the poetry of fact on blue-water currents under the trades."

Reviews published at the re-issue in 1991 were favorable and detailed. Publishers Weekly found O'Brian to be "a graceful writer, and the book is full of wonderful period details". The novel's "peculiar narrative structure" suggests climaxes that do not happen. Richard Snow wrote in 1991 that he had read the novels from Master and Commander to Desolation Island from American publishers twenty years earlier. He enjoyed the happy ending of Master and Commander and was grateful for more, including "a complex and fascinating successor [which] appeared -- The Mauritius Command." O'Brian's "portrayal of life aboard a sailing ship is vivid and authoritative" and O'Brian presented "the lost arcana of that hard-pressed, cruel, courageous world with an immediacy that makes its workings both comprehensible and fascinating." He noted too that "behind the humor, behind the storms and the broadside duels . . . loomed something larger: the shape and texture of a whole era." As strong as the historical detail was, Snow remarked that "in the end it is the serious exploration of human character that gives the books their greatest power", and he also referred to the poetry of the writing, saying that O'Brian "manages to express, with the grace and economy of poetry, familiar things that somehow never get written down, as when he carefully details the rueful steps by which Stephen Maturin falls out of love." At this time of the re-issues of the novels by W W Norton in the US, Snow recommended that a reader start with the first and keep reading to the last one, then "You will have read what I continue to believe are the best historical novels ever written."

Kevin Myers wrote in The Irish Times that "O'Brian's sheer brilliance as a writer constantly dazzles, and his power over the reader is unique. No writer alive can move one as O'Brian can; no one can make you laugh so loud with hilarity, whiten your knuckles with unbearable tension or choke with emotion. He is the master."

== Adaptations ==
From 3 April 2011 the BBC broadcast Roger Danes' dramatization of the book, in three one-hour parts, in the Classic Serial strand on BBC Radio 4. Produced and directed by Bruce Young, its cast was:

- Captain Jack Aubrey – David Robb
- Doctor Stephen Maturin – Richard Dillane
- Governor Farquhar – David Rintoul
- Lt-Col Keating – Thomas Arnold
- Lord Clonfert – Sam Dale
- Captain Corbett – Christian Rodska
- Lt Seymour – Max Dowler
- Midshipman George Johnson – Nyasha Hatendi
- Dr McAdam/Admiral Bertie – Sean Baker
- Captain Pym – Brian Bowles
- Mrs Williams – Joanna Monro
- Sophie – Sally Orrock

== Publication history ==
- 1977, UK, Collins Publishers Hardcover First edition ISBN 0-00-222383-X
- 1978, May UK, Fontana Paperback ISBN 0-00-615348-8
- 1978, May USA, Stein & Day Hardcover edition ISBN 0-8128-2476-8
- 1989, February UK, Fontana Paperback ISBN 0-00-616574-5
- 1991, May USA, W. W. Norton & Company Paperback Reprint edition ISBN 0-393-30762-X
- 1992, December USA, William A. Thomas Braille Bookstore Hardcover edition ISBN 1-56956-071-4
- 1993, April UK, ISIS Audio Books Audio book Patrick Tull (Narrator) ISBN 1-85089-871-5
- 1994, USA, W. W. Norton & Company Hardcover Reprint edition ISBN 0-393-03704-5
- 1996, September UK, HarperCollins Paperback ISBN 0-00-649918-X
- 1997, January UK, HarperCollins Audio book Robert Hardy (Narrator) ISBN 0-00-105295-0
- 2000, November USA, Thorndike Press Hardcover ISBN 0-7862-1935-1
- 2001, March UK, Chivers Hardcover Large-print edition ISBN 0-7540-1519-X)
- 2001, November UK, Recorded Books Unabridged Patrick Tull (Narrator) ISBN 1-4025-0223-0
- 2001, December UK, Chivers Paperback Large-print edition ISBN 0-7540-2398-2
- 2002, September UK, Soundings Audio book (CD), Stephen Thorne (Narrator) ISBN 1-84283-263-8
- 2004, USA, Blackstone Audiobooks audio edition, August 2004, MP3 CD, Simon Vance (Narrator) ISBN 0-7861-8562-7
- 2004, USA, Blackstone Audiobooks audio edition, August 2004, MP3 CD, Simon Vance (Narrator) ISBN 0-7861-8459-0
- 2011, December USA, W. W. Norton & Company e-book ISBN 978-0-393-06049-2

This novel was first issued in the UK in 1977 by Collins and in 1978 in the US by Stein & Day. It was among the many re-issued in paperback by W W Norton in 1990–1991, 14 years after its initial publication by Collins (note list above). More reviewers read this book and others in the series, and the series gained a new audience.

The process of reissuing the novels prior to this novel and The Letter of Marque was in full swing in 1991, as the whole series gained a new and wider audience, as Mark Howowitz describes in writing about The Nutmeg of Consolation, the fourteenth novel in the series and initially published in 1991.

Two of my favorite friends are fictitious characters; they live in more than a dozen volumes always near at hand. Their names are Jack Aubrey and Stephen Maturin, and their creator is a 77-year-old novelist named Patrick O'Brian, whose 14 books about them have been continuously in print in England since the first, "Master and Commander," was published in 1970. O'Brian's British fans include T. J. Binyon, Iris Murdoch, A. S. Byatt, Timothy Mo and the late Mary Renault, but, until recently, this splendid saga of two serving officers in the British Royal Navy during the Napoleonic Wars was unavailable in this country, apart from the first few installments which went immediately out of print. Last year, however, W. W. Norton decided to reissue the series in its entirety, and so far nine of the 14 have appeared here, including the most recent chapter, The Nutmeg of Consolation.

== Bibliography ==
- Richard O'Neill (2003). Patrick O'Brian's Navy: The Illustrated Companion to Jack Aubrey's World. Running Press. ISBN 0-7624-1540-1.
- Dean King (2001). A Sea of Words: Lexicon and Companion for Patrick O'Brian's Seafaring Tales. Henry Holt. ISBN 0-8050-6615-2.
- Dean King (2001). Harbors and High Seas: Map Book and Geographical Guide to the Aubrey/Maturin Novels of Patrick O'Brian. Henry Holt. ISBN 0-8050-6614-4.
- Brian Lavery (2003). Jack Aubrey Commands: An Historical Companion to the Naval World of Patrick O'Brian. Conway Maritime. ISBN 0-85177-946-8.
- Anne Chotzinoff Grossman, Lisa Grossman Thomas (2000). Lobscouse and Spotted Dog: Which Is a Gastronomic Companion to the Aubrey/Maturin Novels. W W Norton & Co Ltd. ISBN 0-393-32094-4.
- David Miller (2003). The World of Jack Aubrey: Twelve-Pounders, Frigates, Cutlasses, and Insignia of His Majesty's Royal Navy. Running Press Book Publishers. ISBN 0-7624-1652-1.
- A.E. Cunningham, ed. (1994). Patrick O'Brian: A Bibliography and Critical Appreciation. British Library Publishing Division. ISBN 0-7123-1071-1.
