= Lucius Curtis =

Royal Navy Admiral of the Fleet (1786–1869)

Admiral of the Fleet Sir Lucius Curtis Bt KCB
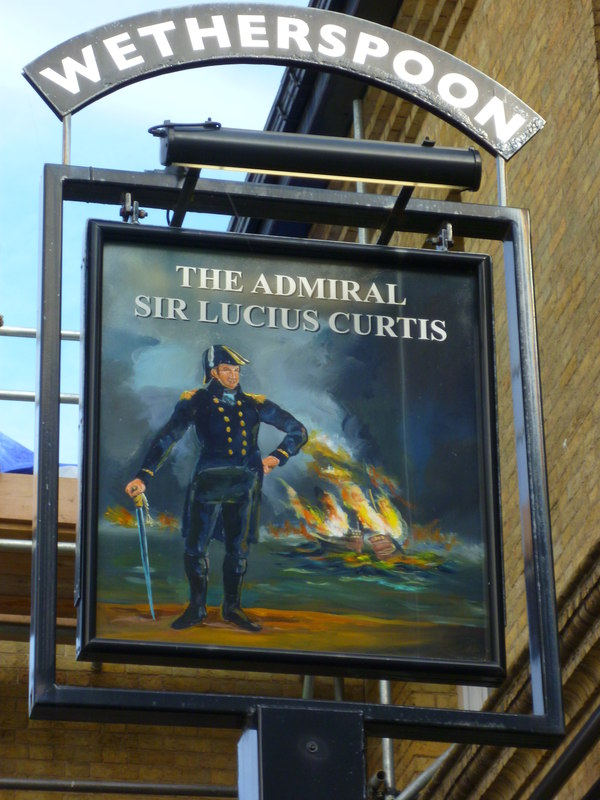
- Portrait of Sir Lucius Curtis (with the frigate HMS Magicienne burning in the background) on a pub sign in Southampton
- Born: 3 June 1786; Portsea, Hampshire
- Died: 14 January 1869 (aged 82); Portsdown Hill, Hampshire
- Military career
- Allegiance: United Kingdom
- Branch: Royal Navy
- Service years: 1795–1869
- Rank: Admiral of the Fleet
- Commands: HMS Jalouse; HMS Rose; HMS Magicienne; HMS Iphigenia; HMS Madagascar; Malta Dockyard
- Conflicts: Napoleonic Wars; Battle of Grand Port
- Awards: Knight Commander of the Order of the Bath

Admiral of the Fleet Sir Lucius Curtis, 2nd Baronet, KCB (3 June 1786 – 14 January 1869) was a Royal Navy officer. The son of Roger Curtis, Lord Howe's flag captain at the Glorious First of June, Curtis served in the Napoleonic Wars. During the Mauritius campaign of 1809–1811, he commanded the frigate HMS Magicienne as part of a blockade squadron under Josias Rowley and was still in command when the ship was destroyed at the Battle of Grand Port. Magicienne grounded on a coral reef early in the engagement and despite the best efforts of Curtis and his crew, the ship had to be abandoned, and was set on fire to prevent her subsequent capture.

After Curtis was freed from French captivity in December 1810, he was cleared of any wrongdoing in the loss of his ship and returned to his naval career. Curtis later rose to the rank of Admiral of the Fleet. As his eldest son predeceased him, the baronetcy in 1869 passed to his second son, Arthur.

== Early career ==
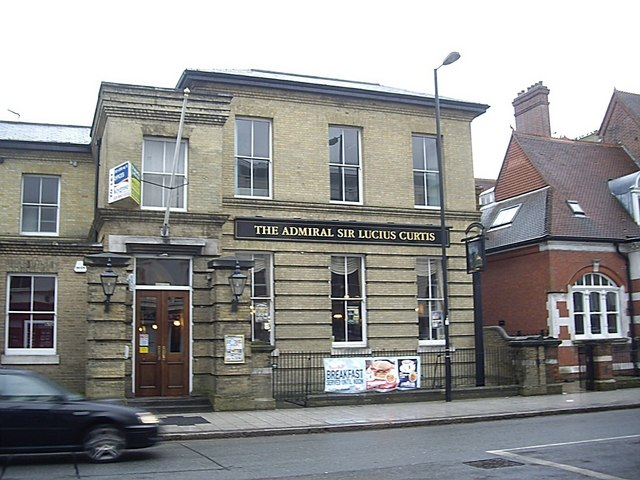
'The Admiral Sir Lucius Curtis' pub on Canute Road, Southampton.

Born the second son of Captain Roger Curtis and his wife Jane Sarah Brady, Curtis joined the Royal Navy in June 1795, by which time his father was an admiral and a senior but controversial figure in the Admiralty.^{a} He was appointed to the first-rate HMS Queen Charlotte in the Channel Squadron and then, having been promoted to midshipman, transferred to the second-rate HMS Prince also in the Channel Squadron in August 1798. Promoted to lieutenant on 11 August 1801, he joined the third-rate HMS Lancaster, flagship of the Cape of Good Hope Station, later that month. In 1802, Curtis' elder brother, also named Roger, died suddenly in naval service: as the remaining son, Curtis received strong patronage due to his family links. He transferred to the third-rate HMS Excellent in September 1803 and, having been promoted to commander on 16 November 1804, became commanding officer of the sloop HMS Jalouse in the Mediterranean Fleet later that month and then commanding officer of the sloop HMS Rose in June 1805.

Promoted to post-captain on 22 January 1806, Curtis took command of the frigate HMS Magicienne, with orders to operate in the Indian Ocean as part of the squadron attempting to blockade the French held islands of Île Bonaparte and Isle de France (now Mauritius). Arriving during hurricane season in December 1809, Curtis had an immediate impact, sighting, chasing and capturing the East Indiaman Windham, previously captured by the French Commodore Jacques Hamelin at the action of 18 November 1809.

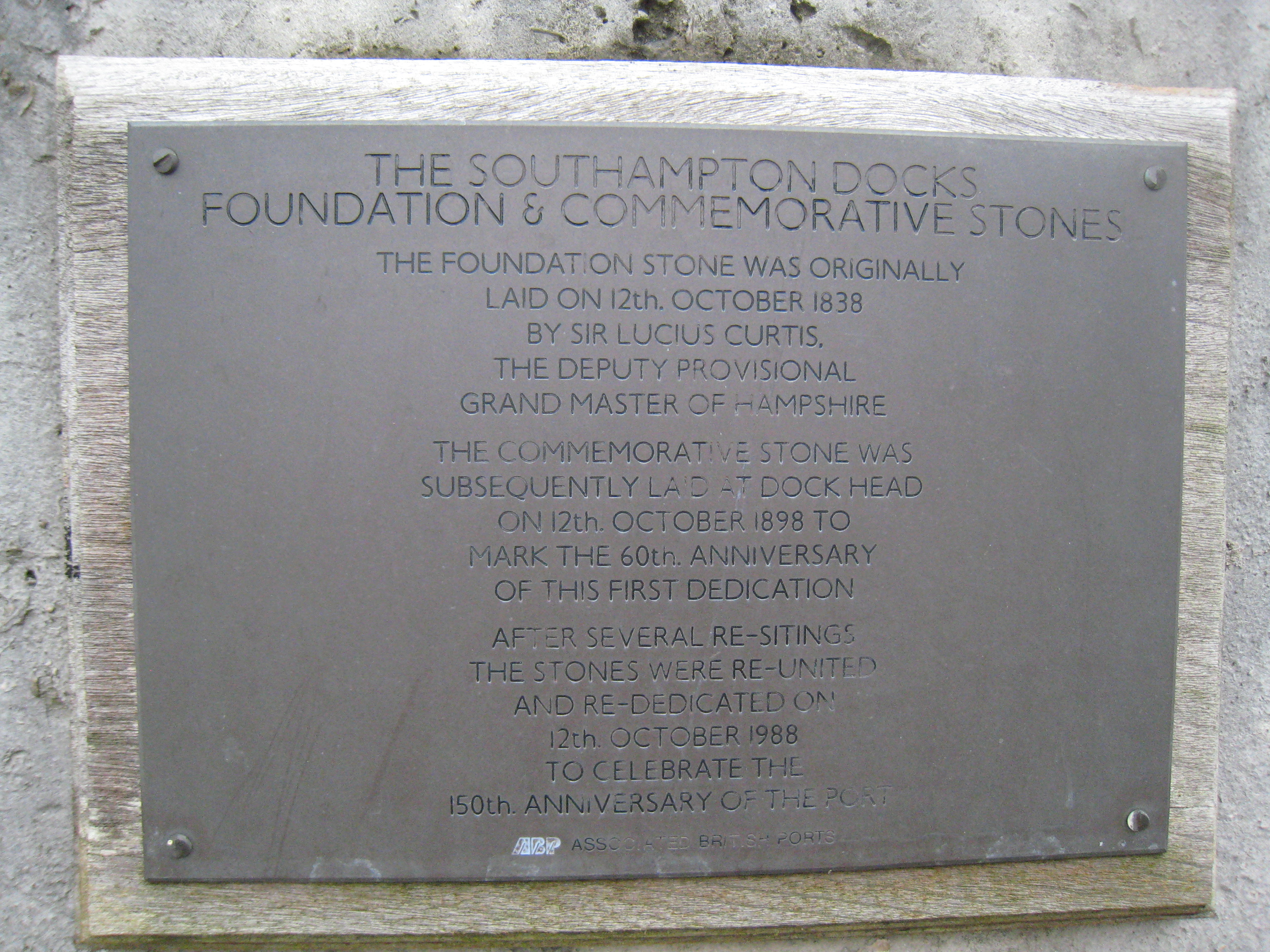
The Southampton Docks foundation & commemorative plaque situated just inside Dock Gate 4. Sir Lucius Curtis laid the original foundation stone on 12 October 1838

In 1810, Magicienne remained off the islands, participating in the Invasion of Île Bonaparte in July and subsequently supporting Captain Samuel Pym off Grand Port. Pym was intending to blockade the harbour to French shipping, but when a squadron under Guy-Victor Duperré arrived off the port on 20 August, Pym sought to lure them into coastal waters and engage them. Duperré successfully broke through Pym's ships however, and took shelter within the harbour. Pym gathered his frigates together and sailed directly into the harbour on 22 August to engage the French. Lacking harbour pilots, Pym's HMS Sirius, Henry Lambert's HMS Iphigenia and Magicienne were soon aground on the coral reefs that sheltered the bay, and the remaining British ship, Nesbit Willoughby's HMS Nereide, was forced to surrender by the French frigates in the port. Of the grounded ships, only Iphigenia sailed again, captured by Hamelin five days later. Sirius and Magicienne were burnt, their crews taking shelter on the tiny Île de la Passe. Without food or fresh water, the sailors were forced to surrender to Hamelin when he arrived and were held prisoner until Isle de France was captured by a British expeditionary force four months later.

Curtis was completely exonerated at the court martial convened to investigate the loss of his ship, given command of the newly re-captured fifth-rate HMS Iphigenia in January 1812 and given command of the fifth-rate HMS Madagascar in February 1813. He continued to rise in the navy, being appointed a Companion of the Order of the Bath on 4 June 1815 and inheriting his father's baronetcy in November 1816. He also became a deputy lieutenant of Hampshire on 17 March 1817.

== Senior command ==
Promoted to rear-admiral on 28 June 1838, Curtis became Admiral Superintendent of Malta Dockyard, with his flag in the fifth-rate HMS Bombay, in March 1843. He was promoted to vice admiral on 15 September 1849 and to full admiral on 9 July 1855 and advanced to Knight Commander of the Order of the Bath on 9 November 1862. He was promoted to Admiral of the Fleet on 11 January 1864.

Curtis was an eminent freemason, serving as Provincial Grand Master for the Province of Hampshire from 1840 until his death. He died at his home at the foot of Portsdown Hill in Hampshire on 14 January 1869. His eldest son had predeceased him, and the baronetcy he had inherited passed to his second son Arthur.

== Family ==
In June 1811 Curtis married Mary Greetham; they had three daughters and four sons.

== Notes ==
^{a} Roger Curtis had been flag captain to Lord Howe at the Glorious First of June, and became closely associated with the perceived injustices in the distribution of awards in the aftermath of the battle. Curtis further infuriated some of his fellow officers by acting as prosecutor at the court-martial in which Anthony Molloy was criticised for his conduct during the Atlantic campaign of May 1794. Molloy was effectively forced out of the Navy and Roger Curtis attracted a significant amount of criticism, especially from Cuthbert Collingwood, who took a personal dislike to him.

== See also ==
- O'Byrne, William Richard (1849). "Curtis, Lucius" . A Naval Biographical Dictionary . John Murray – via Wikisource.

== Sources ==
- Heathcote, Tony (2002). The British Admirals of the Fleet 1734 – 1995. Pen & Sword. ISBN 0-85052-835-6.
- James, William (2002) [1827]. The Naval History of Great Britain, Volume 5, 1808–1811. Conway Maritime Press. ISBN 0-85177-909-3.

Military offices
Preceded by John Louis	Admiral Superintendent, Malta Dockyard; 1843–1848	Succeeded by Edward Harvey
Baronetage of Great Britain
Preceded by Roger Curtis	Baronet (of Gatcombe); 1816–1869	Succeeded by Arthur Colin Curtis
