= HMS Iphigenia (1808) =

Frigate of the Royal Navy

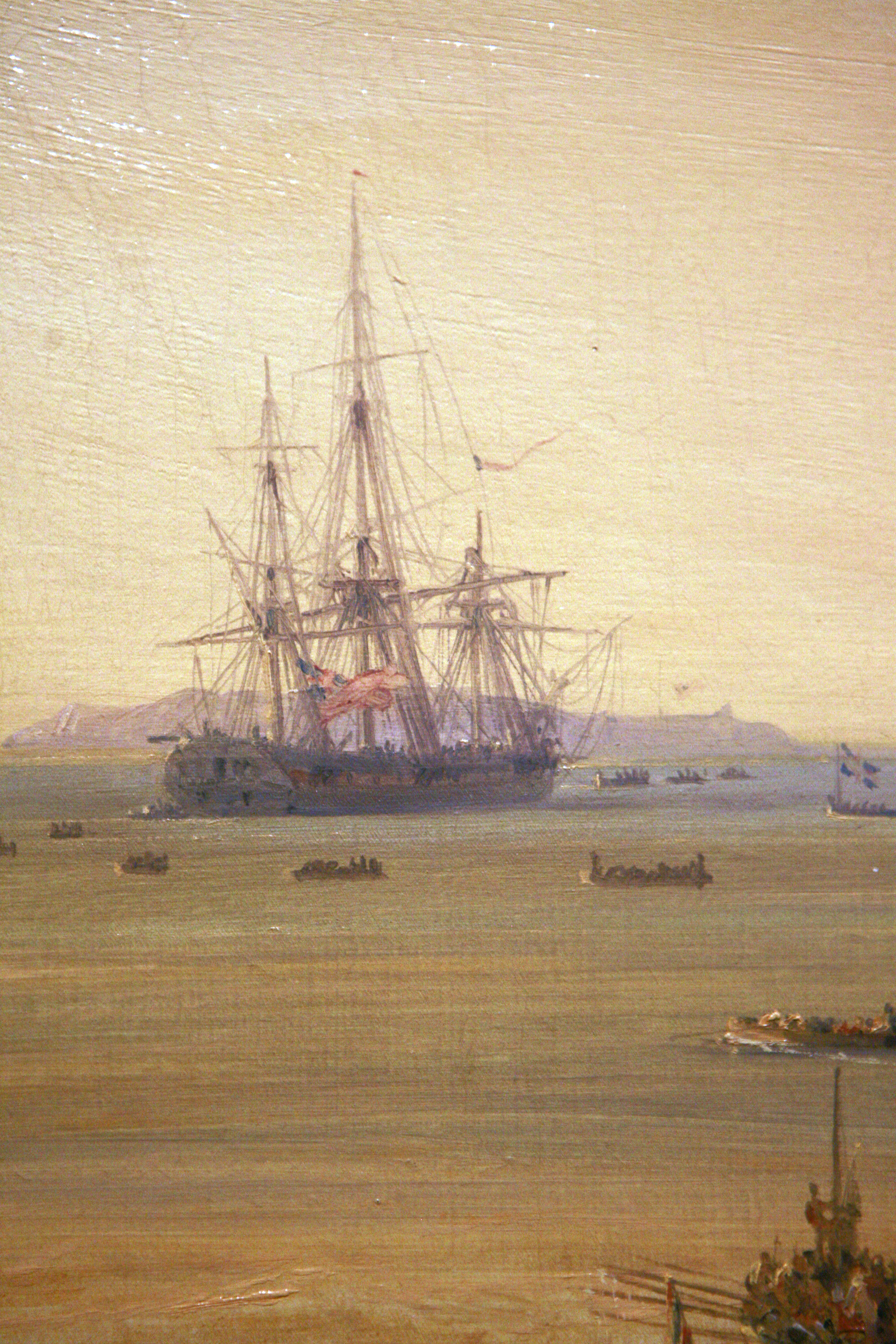
- HMS Iphigenia at the Battle of Grand Port

History

United Kingdom
- Name: HMS Iphigenia
- Namesake: Iphigeneia
- Laid down: 1805
- Launched: 26 April 1808
- Captured: at the Battle of Grand Port, late August 1810
- Fate: captured

France
- Name: Iphigénie
- Acquired: August 1810 by capture
- Captured: December 1810

United Kingdom
- Name: HMS Iphigenia
- Acquired: December 1810 by capture
- Fate: Broken up May 1851

General characteristics
- Class & type: Perseverance-class fifth-rate frigate
- Tons burthen: 870, or 876 (bm)
- Propulsion: Sail
- Complement: 264
- Armament: UD: 26 x 18-pound long guns; QD: 12 x 32-pound carronadess; Fc: 4 x 9-pound long guns

HMS Iphigenia was a Royal Navy 36-gun Perseverance-class fifth-rate frigate. She was built at Chatham Dockyard by Master Shipwright Robert Seppings.

The French captured her at the debacle of Grand Port and in their service she participated in the capture of several British vessels. The British recaptured her and she served in the West Africa squadron (or "Preventative Squadron"), combating the slave trade. She was broken up in 1851 after serving for many years as a training ship.

== British service ==
Captain Henry Lambert commissioned Iphigenia and on 28 January 1809 sailed her to the Cape of Good Hope and Bombay. On 13 September she was at Bombay where her crew helped fight, albeit unsuccessfully, the fire on Shah Ardaseer.

In 1810 she joined the British squadron off Isle de France (now Mauritius). The squadron consisted of Iphigenia, Leopard, Magicienne and Néréide. The squadron blockaded Isle de France from May, and started operations to attempt a take-over on 7 July 1810. Iphigenia was present at the capture of Réunion the next day.

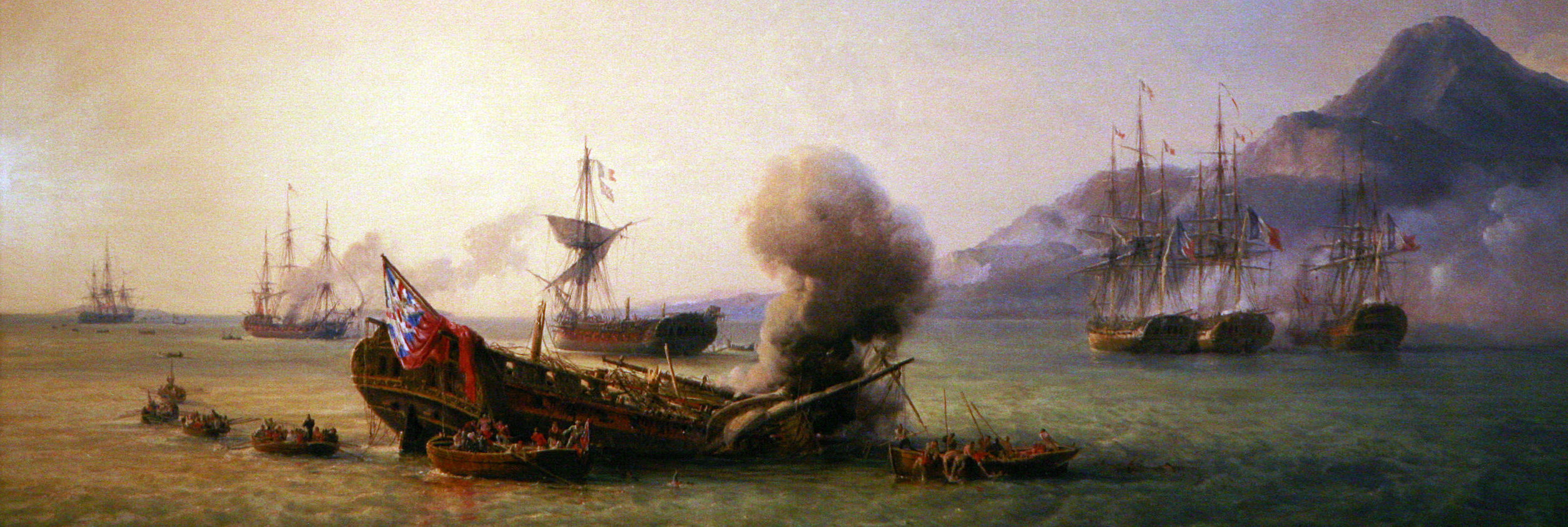
The Battle of Grand Port; Iphigenia is first from the left. By Pierre Julien Gilbert.

On 10 August, the squadron, under Samuel Pym, landed parties to capture the Île de la Passe and take control of Port-Impérial, initiating the Battle of Grand Port. From 23 August, the British squadron faced off against a French squadron under Guy-Victor Duperré, comprising Minerve, Bellone and Victor. The French had moved the buoys marking the passage through the reef, causing Magicienne and Sirius to run aground and leading the British to scuttle them by fire. Néréide was captured. Iphigenia, which had been kept in reserve, attempted to flee, but French reinforcements under Hamelin - (Vénus, Manche and Créole) - intercepted her, forcing Iphigenia to strike her colours.

== French service ==
Iphigenia was taken into French service as Iphigénie, under Pierre Bouvet, who had assumed command of the French squadron at Grand Port after Duperré was wounded, and had been promoted to Acting Captain 2nd class. (Note: Capitaine de vaisseau à titre provisoire) She formed a squadron with Astrée and Entreprenant.

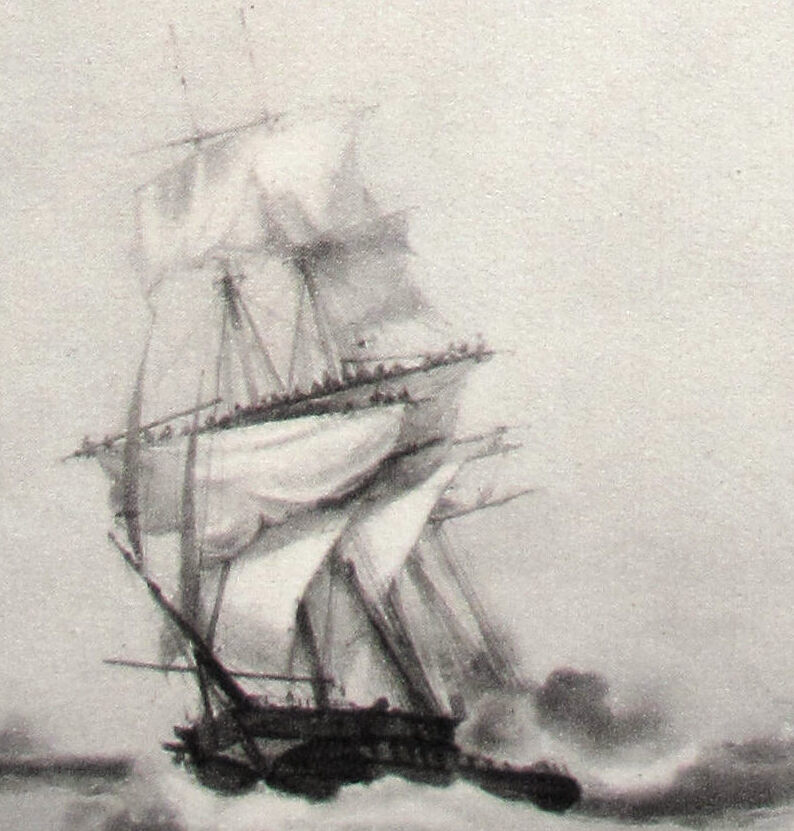
Painting of HMS Africaine

On 12 September 1810, Bouvet's squadron intercepted HMS Africaine (under Captain Robert Corbet) off Saint-Denis, as the frigate HMS Boadicea, the sloop HMS Otter and the brig HMS Staunch were sailing from the bay of Saint-Paul. Bouvet lured the British into pursuit until midnight. He sent Astrée forwards, as if Iphigénie would attempt to slow Africaine down to allow the rest of the squadron to flee. At three, Astrée regained her place at the rear of the squadron; the weather, which had been rough, improved somewhat, and in the moonlight Astrée suddenly found herself within gun range of Africaine, with Boadicea, Otter and Staunch out of sight. A gunnery duel followed immediately, in which Astrée had her rigging damaged; she closed in to Iphigénie, Africaine in close pursuit. Africaine soon found herself under fire from Iphigénie at point blank range, her guns still trained at Astrée. After exchanging broadsides and small arms fire for half an hour, during which the French had the upper hand, the British attempted a boarding. Iphigénie easily eluded Africaine, and gave Astrée an opportunity for raking Africaine's bow. At 4:30, Africaine struck her colours.

All Africaine's officers had been killed or wounded in the action, save for Colonel Barry, and only 69 men were uninjured. Bouvet was given Corbet's dagger, which he kept in his personal possession. The French abandoned Africaine and Boadicea recaptured her the next day.

On 3 December 1810, the Isle de France fell to the British. The British took over the ships moored at the island, including Iphigénie, Bellone and Astrée. They recommissioned Iphigénie, returning her to service as Iphigenia. Captain Thomas Caulfield then sailed her home to Britain where she was paid off in April 1811.

== Return to British service ==
After fitting out at Portsmouth from November to February 1812, Iphigenia was recommissioned in January under Captain Lucius Curtis. On 25 March 1812 she sailed with a convoy for the East Indies.

Later, under Captain Fleetwood Pellew, Iphegenia sailed for the Mediterranean on 6 December. In February 1813, while still in the Mediterranean, she came under the command of Captain Andrew King. On 17 April 1814, a British squadron consisting of Furieuse, Aboukir, Iphigenia, Swallow and Cephalus supported the successful assault on Genoa. (Note: A first-class share of the prize money for Genoa was worth £538 5s 2¾d; a sixth-class share, that of an ordinary seaman, was worth £3 12s 4d. In a later, second payment, a first-class share was worth £169 2s 8d, while a sixth-class share was worth £1 2s 8¼d. In a third payment, a first-class share of the prize money was worth £69 6s 1d; a sixth-class share, that of an ordinary seaman, was worth 9s 4d.) Afterwards, King escorted a convoy of transports from Gibraltar to Bermuda.

== Post war ==
She underwent repairs at Chatham between June and September 1815, and sailed for the East Indies again in October. King returned home from the East Indies in command of the Third Rate Cornwallis.

In September 1816 Captain John Tancock took command of Iphigenia in Trincomalee. (Note: For more on John Tancock see: O'Byrne, William R. (1849). "Tancock, John" . A Naval Biographical Dictionary. London: John Murray.) In December 1817 he sailed her back to Britain in company with Melville, whose fitting out in Bombay he had overseen.

Between January and June 1818 she was at Portsmouth having defects made good. Captain Hyde Parker took command on 15 March and eventually sailed Iphigenia for Jamaica. She served also on the Quebec and Mediterranean stations before being paid off on 12 June 1821.

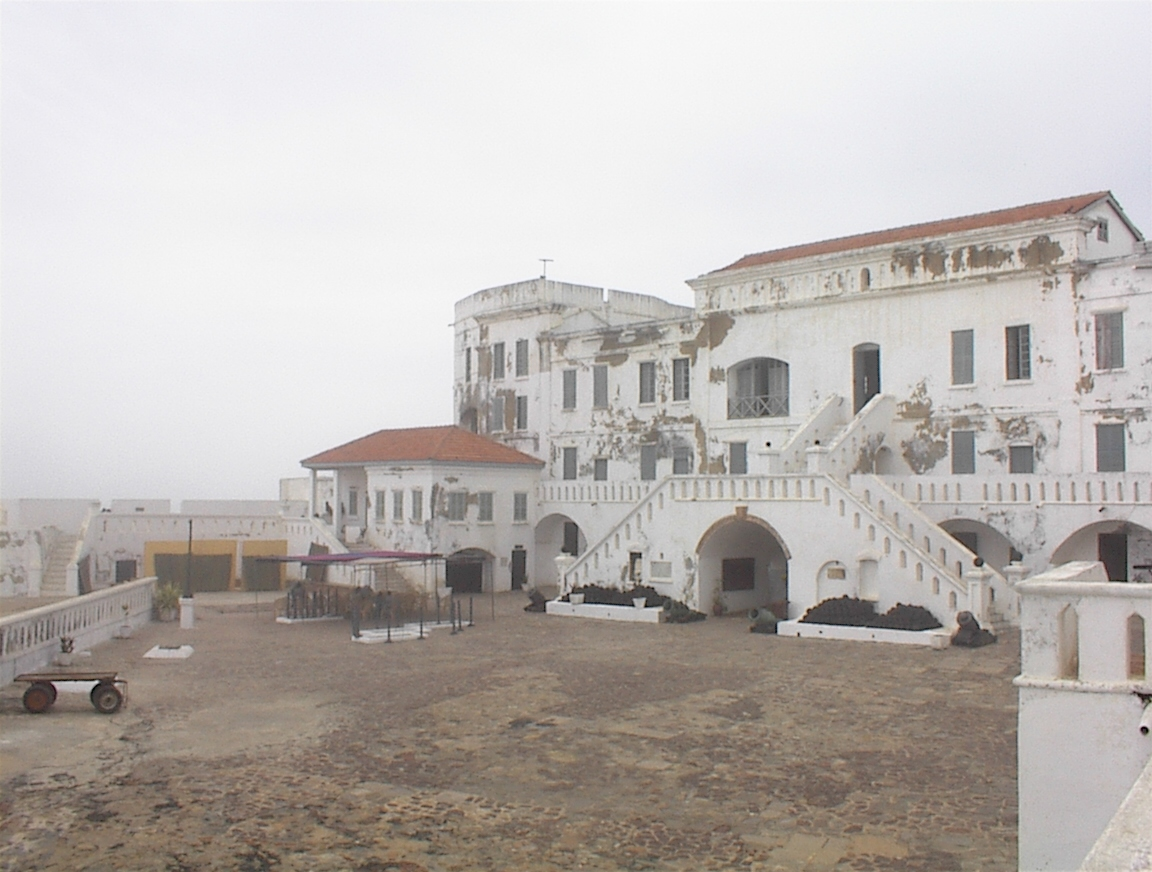
Cape Coast Castle

In 1821 Iphegenia was recommissioned under Captain Sir Robert Mends. She then served in the anti-slave patrol off Africa with Mends as Commodore of the West Africa squadron. On 22 March 1822 she transported Sir Charles McCarthy, Governor of Sierra Leone, to Cape Coast Castle to assume the governorship of the Gold Coast.

On 15 April, her boats captured six slave ships on the Bonny River: Vigilante, Petite Betsey, Ursule, the Spanish Yeanam, Becaa, and the French brigantine Utile. In June Yeanam foundered in a tornado, claiming the lives of two officers, 16 men and 400 slaves; seven of the Iphigenia's crew managed to survive on the wreckage of the Yeanam.

In August 1822 Iphigenia was again in the Caribbean. On 27 August her barge, under the command of Lieutenant Stokes, in company with Zephyr, Harrison, which was on her way from Jamaica to London, captured a pirate schooner of about 250 tons (bm), six 18-pounder guns, and 60 men. The capture took place between Matanzas and Double Headed Shot Cays. The pirate had captured Sarah, of Nassau, but the barge and Zephyr recaptured her and sent her on her way. Iphigenia sent the prize into Havana.

== Fate ==
She was fitted at Woolwich between December 1832 and July 1833. Between 1833 and 1848, she was lent to the Marine Society as a training ship.

In 1849 she reported two attacks of cholera and one death between 1 and 12 July, inclusive.

"The Commissioners for executing the office of Lord High Admiral of the United Kingdom of Great Britain and Ireland" offered Iphigenia for sale at Woolwich on 19 February 1850. She was finally broken up at Deptford in May 1851.
