= HMS Staunch (1804) =

UK naval brig (1804–1811)

History

United Kingdom
- Name: HMS Staunch
- Ordered: 9 January 1804
- Builder: Benjamin Tanner, Dartmouth, Devon
- Launched: 21 August 1804
- Commissioned: September 1804
- Fate: Presumed foundered, June 1811

General characteristics
- Class & type: Archer-class gun-brig
- Tons burthen: 177 31/94 bm
- Length: 80 ft (24 m) (gundeck); 65 ft 10 1/4 in (20.1 m) (keel)
- Beam: 22 ft 6 in (6.86 m)
- Depth of hold: 9 ft 5 in (2.87 m)
- Sail plan: Brig
- Complement: 50
- Armament: 10 × 18-pounder carronades + 2 × chase guns

HMS Staunch was a Royal Navy 12-gun Archer-class gun-brig, built by Benjamin Tanner and launched in 1804 at Dartmouth, Devon. She served in the Indian Ocean and participated in the action of 18 September 1810 before she foundered with the loss of all hands in 1811.

== Service ==
Staunch was commissioned in September 1804 under Lieutenant Benjamin Street and was attached to the Channel Fleet. On 30 August 1806, Staunch sailed for the Cape of Good Hope, with orders to assist in the invasions of Buenos Aires and Montevideo. Staunch's crew landed and participated in the attack on Montevideo, suffering losses in the battle (one killed and four wounded).

On 1 June, the Spanish privateer schooner Mosca de Buenos Aires, of four guns and 60 men, under the command of Juan Bautista Azopardo, outran Staunch and the brig Protector as they chased her upriver. Later, two boats from the British warships attempted to seize Mosca de Buenos Aires in shallow waters. They failed, although they did manage to capture an enemy sloop. On 28 June, Staunch captured another sloop and destroyed two other vessels of a convoy going to the south shore for troops. When the British invasion failed, Staunch retired to the Cape of Good Hope.

In 1810, Staunch was attached to Commodore Josias Rowley's squadron on Île Bourbon and from there was part of the blockading force under Samuel Pym that was almost totally destroyed at the Battle of Grand Port (20–27 August 1810) over possession of the harbour of Grand Port on Isle de France (now Mauritius). Staunch had been sent back to Rowley for reinforcements and so was not with the squadron at its destruction.

Earlier, Staunch participated in the 10–17 August expeditions to capture the Île de la Passe. On 28 August Staunch, Boadicea, and Otter shared in the capture of Garronne. On 4 September the same three vessels shared in the capture of Ranger. (Note: The prize money for a first-class share, such as a captain would receive, was £55 14s 11d; an ordinary seaman received 10s 7 1/2d.)

Staunch was later part of Rowley's squadron at the action of 13 September 1810 and helped drive off a French squadron under Pierre Bouvet at the action of 18 September 1810. In this action Staunch assisted in the recapture of Ceylon and the capture of Vénus.

Nearly four decades later the Admiralty recognized Staunch's role in the battle by the clasp "Staunch 18 Sept. 1810" attached to the Naval General Service Medal, awarded upon application to all of her crew still living in 1847.

In November 1810, command passed to Lieutenant Hector Craig (acting), Street having removed to the government ship Emma as captain (acting). Craig then commanded Staunch in support of the successful Invasion of Isle de France (29 November to 3 December). (Note: A first-class share was worth £278 19s 5 3/4d; a sixth-class share, that of an ordinary seaman, was worth £3 7s 6 1/4d. A fourth and final payment was made in July 1828. A first-class share was worth £29 19s 5 1/4d; a sixth-class share was worth 8s 2 1/2d.)

On 5 January 1811 Sir Francis Drake, Nisus, Iphigenia, and Hesper, participated in the capture of the French schooner Mouche. Staunch apparently was also entitled to share in the prize money.

== Fate ==
In June 1811, while sailing off Madagascar, Staunch disappeared. She is believed to have foundered with the loss of her entire crew of 76.
