= Battle of Grand Port =

1810 battle of the Mauritius campaign of 1809–1811

- Part of the Mauritius campaign of 1809–1811
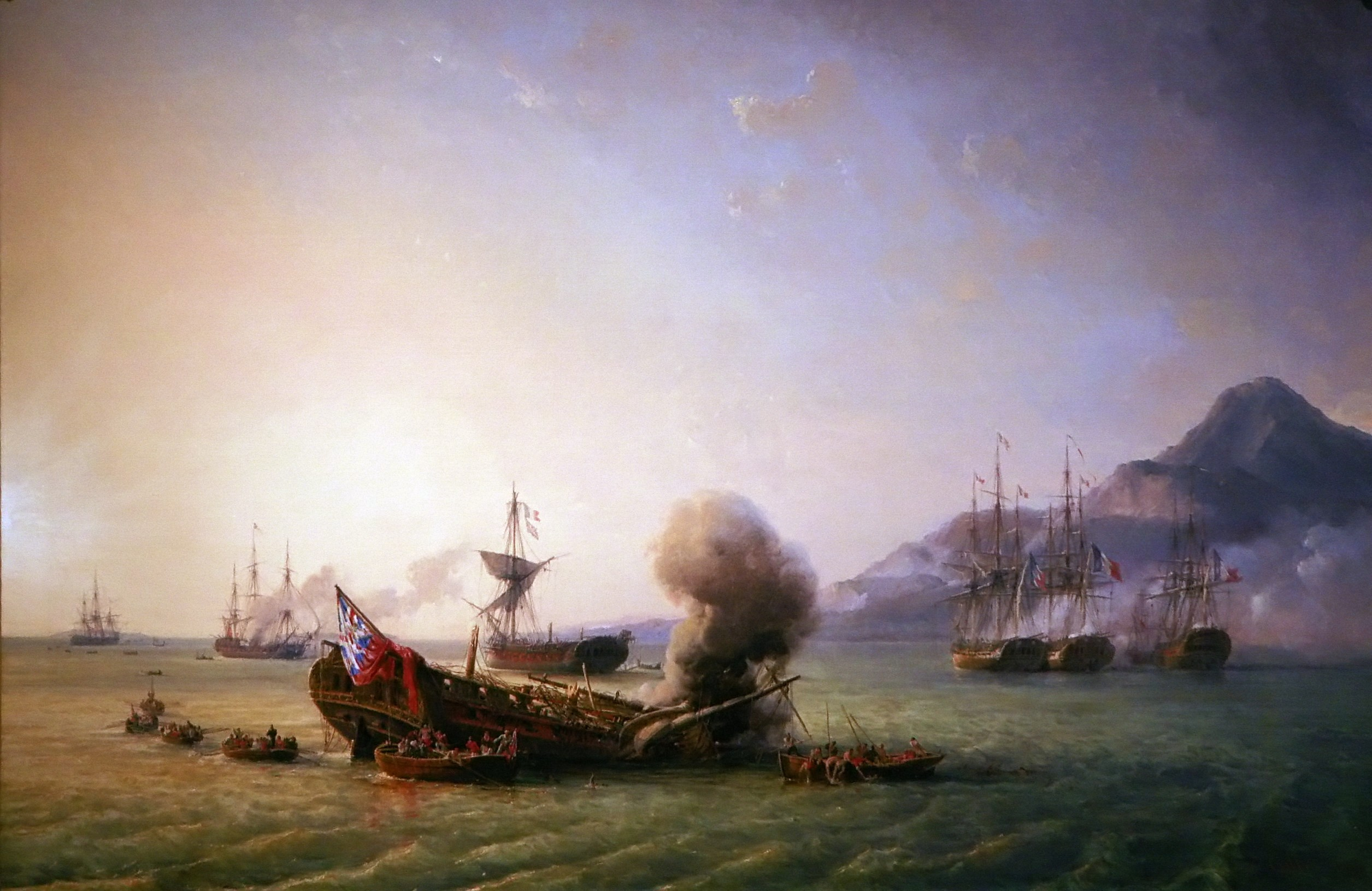
- Painting of the battle
Date	20–27 August 1810
Location	Grand Port, Isle de France 20°23′25″S 57°44′02″E
Result	French victory

Belligerents
France	United Kingdom

Commanders and leaders
Guy-Victor Duperré (WIA); Jacques Hamelin	Samuel Pym (surrendered)

Strength
5 frigates 1 corvette 1 brig 2 merchant ships	4 frigates 1 troopship

Casualties and losses
37 killed 112 wounded 1 merchant ship captured	105 killed 163 wounded 2 frigates scuttled 2 frigates captured 1 troopship captured

The Battle of Grand Port was fought on 20–27 August 1810 in the harbour of Grand Port between the British and French navies over the harbour of Grand Port as part of the Mauritius campaign of 1809–1811. A British squadron of four frigates under Captain Samuel Pym sought to blockade Grand Port in the French colony of Isle de France by capturing the fortified Île de la Passe at the port's entrance. The position was seized by a British landing party on 13 August, and when a French squadron under Frigate Captain Guy-Victor Duperré approached the bay nine days later, Pym decided to lure them into coastal waters where his forces could ambush them.

Most of Duperré's squadron managed to break past the British blockade and take shelter in the protected anchorage, which was only accessible through a series of complicated routes between reefs and sandbanks that were impassable without an experienced harbour pilot. When Pym ordered his frigates to attack the French warships on 22 and 23 August, his ships became trapped in the narrow channels of the bay: two were irretrievably grounded, a third struck her colours after being outnumbered and a fourth was unable to close to within effective gun range. Although the French ships were also badly damaged in the exchange of gunfire, the battle was a disaster for the British: one ship was captured after suffering irreparable damage, the grounded ships were scuttled to prevent their capture by French boarding parties and the remaining frigate was seized as it left the harbour by the main French squadron from Port Napoleon under Commodore Jacques Hamelin.

The battle was one of the worst defeats suffered by the British navy during the Napoleonic Wars, and left Britain's vital trade convoys in the Indian Ocean exposed to attack from Hamelin's ships. In response, the British reinforced their squadron on Isle Bourbon under Commodore Josias Rowley by ordering all available ships to the region, but this piecemeal reinforcement resulted in a series of desperate actions as individual British ships were attacked by the confident and more powerful French squadron. In December an adequate reinforcement was assembled with the provision of a strong squadron under Admiral Albemarle Bertie, which rapidly invaded and captured Isle de France.

== Background ==
During the early 19th century, the Indian Ocean formed an essential part of the network of trade routes that connected the British Empire. Heavily laden East Indiamen travelled from ports in British India such as Bombay and Calcutta to Britain carrying millions of pounds of goods. From Britain, the ships returned on the same routes, often transporting recruits for the growing Presidency armies, which were under the control of the East India Company (EIC). Following the outbreak of the Napoleonic Wars in 1803, the British Admiralty had made the security of these routes a priority, resulting in Britain occupying the Dutch Cape Colony and destroying the Dutch navy squadron in Java between 1806 and 1807. The two main French colonies in the Indian Ocean, Isle Bonaparte and Isle de France, were more complicated targets, protected from attack not only by the great distances involved in preparing an invasion attempt but also by heavy fortifications and substantial French Imperial Army garrisons augmented by large colonial militias.

The French had recognised the importance of these islands as bases for raiding warships during the French Revolutionary Wars, but by late 1807 the only naval resources allocated to the region were a few aging frigates and a large number of local privateers. Following the reduction of these remaining naval forces on Isle de France by defeat in battle and disarmaments due to age and unseaworthiness during 1808, the French Imperial Navy made a serious attempt to disrupt British trade in the region, ordering five large modern frigates to sail to Isle de France under Commodore Jacques Félix Emmanuel Hamelin. Four of these ships broke through the British blockade of the French coast, arriving in the Indian Ocean in the spring of 1809, where Hamelin dispersed them into the Bay of Bengal with orders to intercept, attack, and capture or destroy the heavily armed but extremely valuable convoys of East Indiamen. The first French success came at the end of the spring, when the frigate Caroline successfully attacked a convoy in the action of 31 May 1809, seizing two heavily laden merchant ships.

Commodore Josias Rowley was given command of the British response, a hastily assembled force composed mainly of those ships which happened to be available at the Cape of Good Hope in early 1809. Ordered to stop the French raiders, Rowley was unable to spread his small squadron wide enough to pursue the roving French frigates, instead using his forces to blockade and raid the French islands in anticipation of Hamelin's return. In August, Caroline arrived with her prizes at Saint-Paul on Isle Bonaparte and Rowley determined to seize the frigate. He planned a successful invasion of the town, launched on 20 September, which resulted in the capture of the port's defences, Caroline, and the captured East Indiamen. With his objectives complete, Rowley withdrew five days later. Almost a year later, Rowley returned with a larger task force and made a second landing around the capital of Isle Bonaparte, Saint-Denis. Marching on the seat of government, Rowley's troops rapidly overwhelmed the defences and forced the island's garrison to surrender, renaming the island Isle Bourbon and installing a British governor.

Hamelin had used the British preoccupation with Isle Bonaparte to send additional frigates to sea during 1809 and early 1810, including his flagship Vénus, which captured three East Indiamen in the action of 18 November 1809, and Bellone, which took the Portuguese frigate Minerva in the Bay of Bengal a few days later. Minerva, renamed Minerve in French hands, was subsequently involved in the action of 3 July 1810, when a further two East Indiamen were captured. The squadron in this action was commanded by Guy-Victor Duperré in Bellone, whose ships were so badly damaged that Duperré was forced to spend nearly a month repairing his vessels in the Comoros Islands before they were ready to return to Isle de France.

=== Operations off Grand Port ===
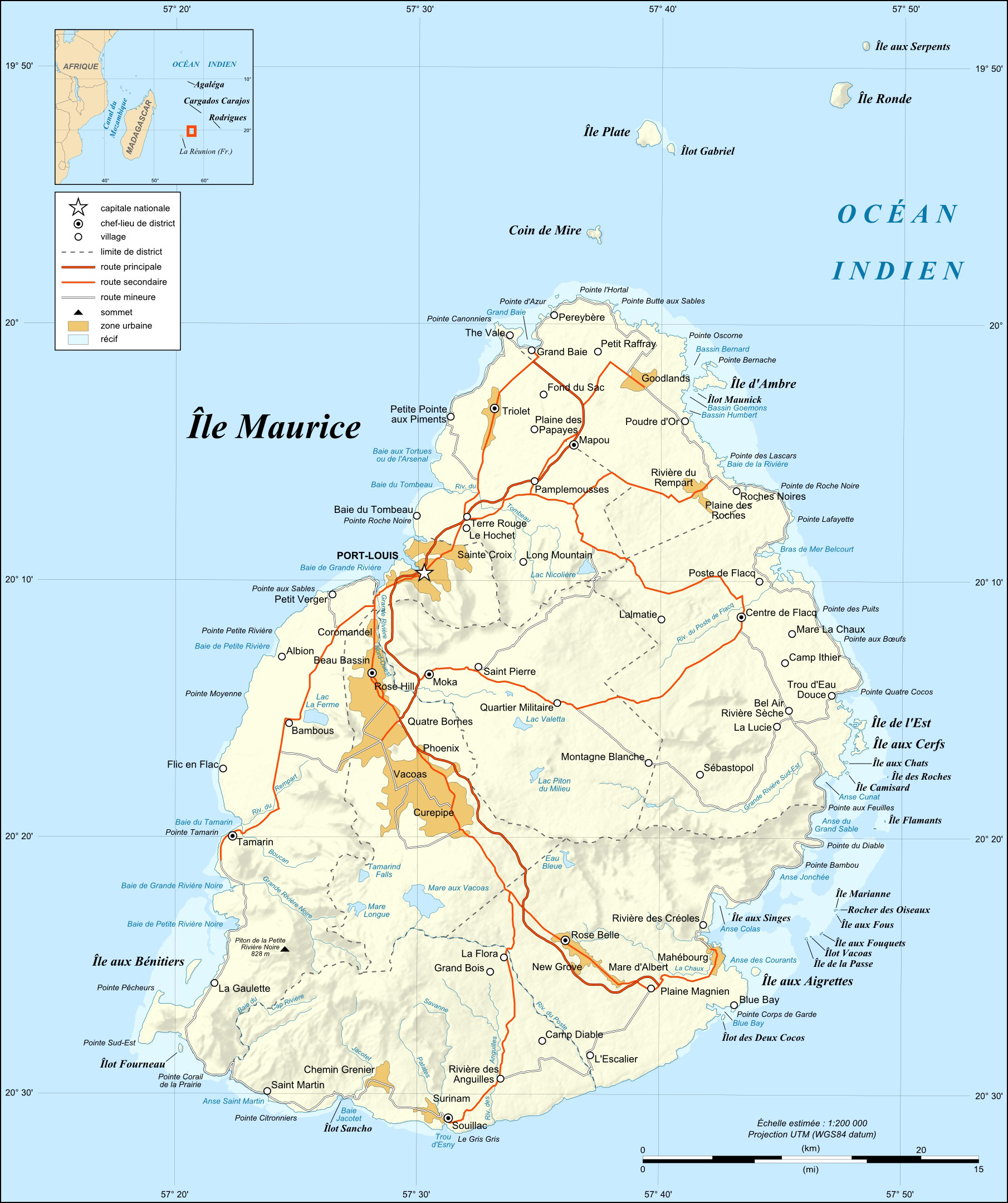
A modern map of Mauritius. Grand Port is on the southeastern shore near Mahébourg.

With Isle Bourbon secured in July 1810, the British now occupied a large fortified island base within easy sailing distance of Isle de France. Even before Isle Bourbon was completely in British hands, Rowley had detached HMS Sirius from the invasion squadron with orders to restore the blockade of Isle de France. Shortly afterwards, Captain Samuel Pym of HMS Sirius led his men in a raid on a coastal vessel moored off the southern side of the island. Two days after this successful operation, British reinforcements arrived in the form of the frigates HMS Iphigenia and HMS Nereide, and the small brig HMS Staunch. Nereide carried 100 specially selected infantrymen from the 69th and 33rd Regiments and some artillerymen from the garrison at Madras to be used in storming and garrisoning offshore islands, beginning with Île de la Passe, a heavily fortified islet off the southeastern shore which protected the entrance to the natural harbour of Grand Port. These fortified islands could be used to block entry to the ports of Isle de France and thus trap Hamelin's squadron.

Grand Port was an easily defensible natural harbour because the bay was protected from the open sea by a large coral reef through which a complicated channel meandered, known only to experienced local pilots. Île de la Passe was vitally important in the control of Grand Port because it was equipped with a heavy battery that covered the entrance to the channel, thus controlling the passage to the sheltered inner lagoon. The British planned to use the troops on Nereide, under her captain Nesbit Willoughby, to storm Île de la Passe and capture the battery. Willoughby would then use a local man serving on his ship named John Johnson (referred to in some texts as "the black pilot"), to steer through the channel and land troops near the town, distributing leaflets promising freedom and prosperity under British rule in an attempt to corrode the morale of the defenders.

The first attack on Île de la Passe was launched on the evening of 10 August, with Staunch towing boats carrying over 400 soldiers, Royal Marines, and volunteer sailors to the islet under cover of darkness, guided by Nereide's pilot. During the night the pilot became lost; the boats were scattered in high winds and had not reassembled by dawn. To distract French attention from the drifting boats, Pym directed Captain Henry Lambert in Iphigenia to sail conspicuously off Port Napoleon, where the main body of the French squadron, led by Hamelin in Vénus, was based. Pym joined Lambert later in the day and the frigates subsequently returned to the waters of Grand Port by different routes, confusing French observers from the shore as to British intentions. By 13 August, the boats originally intended for the attack had still not been assembled and Pym decided that he could not risk waiting any longer without the French launching a counterattack. Launching his own boats at 8:00 pm, guided by the pilot and commanded by Pym's second-in-command, Lieutenant Norman, Pym's marines and sailors landed on the island in darkness under heavy fire from the defenders. Norman was killed in the initial exchange of fire, but his deputy, Lieutenant Watling, seized the island by storming the fortifications surrounding the battery. Seven British personnel were killed and 18 wounded in the battle, in which the storming party managed to seize intact French naval code books and took 80 prisoners. Willoughby was furious that Pym had assumed command of the operation without his permission and the officers exchanged angry letters, part of an ongoing disagreement between them that engendered mutual distrust.

With Île de la Passe secure, Pym gave command of the blockade of Grand Port to Willoughby and returned to his station off Port Napoleon with Iphigenia. Willoughby used his independent position to raid the coastline, landing at Pointe du Diable on 17 August on the northern edge of Grand Port with 170 men and storming the fort there, destroying ten cannon and capturing another. Marching south towards the town of Grand Port itself, Willoughby's men fought off French counterattacks and distributed propaganda pamphlets at the farms and villages they passed. Willoughby re-embarked his troops in the evening but landed again the following day at Grande Rivière to observe the effects of his efforts. Burning a signal station, Willoughby advanced inland, but was checked by the arrival of 800 French reinforcements from Port Napoleon and returned to HMS Nereide. The brief expedition cost the British two men wounded and one missing, to French casualties of at least ten killed or wounded. Willoughby followed the attack on Grande Rivière with unopposed minor landings on 19 and 20 August.

=== Duperré's arrival ===
Willoughby's raiding was interrupted at 10:00 am on 20 August when five ships were sighted, rapidly approaching from the southeast. These ships were Guy-Victor Duperré's squadron of Bellone, Minerve, the corvette Victor, and prizes Windham and Ceylon returning from the Comoros Islands. Following a month of repairs on Anjouan, Duperré had sailed for Isle de France without encountering any opposition on his return passage, and was intending to enter Grand Port via the channel protected by Île de la Passe. Duperré was unaware of the British occupation of the island, and Willoughby intended to lure the French squadron into the channel by concealing the British presence off the harbour. Once there, Willoughby hoped to defeat them or damage them so severely that they would be unable to break out unaided, thus isolating Duperré's squadron from Hamelin's force in Port Napoleon and containing the French in separate harbours to prevent them from concentrating against the British blockade squadrons. Willoughby brought Nereide close to Île de la Passe to combine their fire and protect his boats, which were carrying 160 men back to Nereide from a raid near Grand Port that morning.

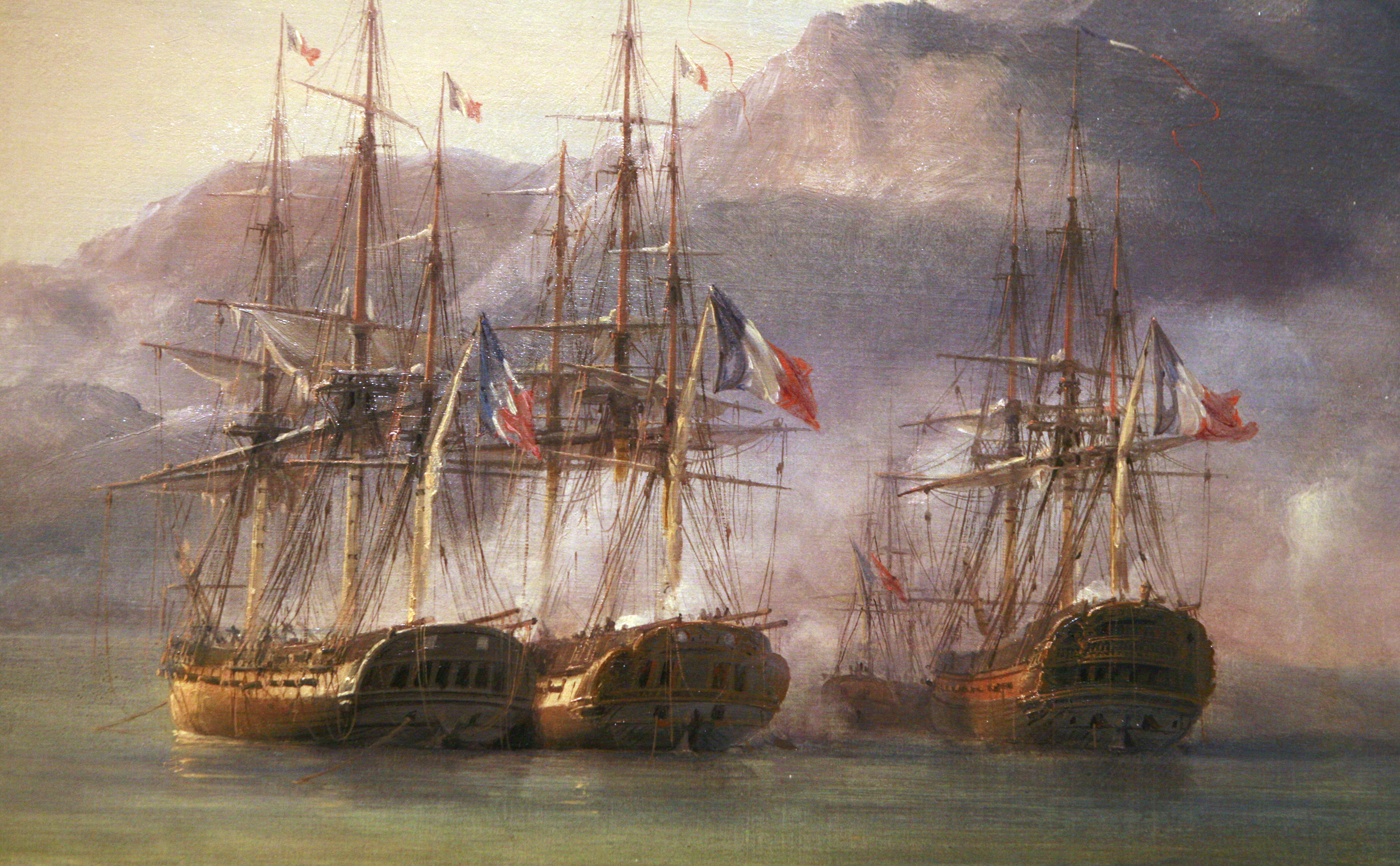
The French squadron at Grand Port. From left to right: Bellone, Minerve, Victor (background), and Ceylon, detail from Combat de Grand Port by Pierre-Julien Gilbert.

Raising a French tricolour over Île de la Passe and on Nereide, Willoughby transmitted the French code captured on the island: "L'ennemi croise au Coin de Mire" (Note: "The enemy is cruising at Coin de Mire", a rock off the northern coast of Isle de France. (Troude, op. cit., p. 90)) and received an acknowledgement from Duperré. The use of these signals convinced Duperré, over the objections of Captain Pierre Bouvet on Minerve, that Néréide was Surcouf's privateer Charles, which was expected from France. The French squadron closed with the harbour during the morning, Victor entering the channel under Île de la Passe at 1:40 pm. As Victor passed Néréide and the fort, Willoughby opened fire, Lieutenant Nicolas Morice surrendering the outnumbered corvette after the first volley. Willoughby sent boats to attempt to take possession of Victor, but they were unable to reach the vessel. Behind the corvette, Minerve and Ceylon pushed into the channel and signalled Morice to follow them, exchanging fire with the fort. As Morice raised his colours again and followed Minerve, a large explosion blasted out of Île de la Passe, where the false French flag had ignited on a brazier as it was lowered and set fire to a nearby stack of cartridges, which exploded in the close confines of the fort. Three men were killed and 12 badly burned, six cannon were dismounted and one discharged unexpectedly, killing a British sailor in a boat attempting to board Victor. With the fort out of action and a significant number of her crew scattered in small boats in the channel, Néréide was alone and unable to block French entry to Grand Port.

With Willoughby's ambush plan ruined, the scattered boats sought to rejoin Néréide, passing directly through the French squadron. Although several boats were in danger of being run down by the French ships and one even bumped alongside Minerve, all eventually rejoined Néréide safely. The opportunity to cause significant damage to the French in the narrow channel had been lost, with Bellone joining the squadron in passing through the channel with minimal resistance. In addition to British losses in the explosion at the fort, two men had been killed and one wounded on Néréide. French losses were more severe: Minerve suffered 23 casualties and Ceylon eight. With both sides recognising that further action was inevitable, Willoughby sent a boat to Sirius requesting additional assistance and Duperré sent a message overland with Lieutenant Morice, requesting support from Hamelin's squadron (Morice fell from his horse during the mission and was severely injured). Command of Victor passed to Henri Moisson. In the afternoon, Willoughby used mortars on Île de la Passe to shell the French squadron, forcing Duperré to retreat into the shallow harbour at Grand Port. Willoughby subsequently sent officers into Grand Port on 21 August under a flag of truce, demanding the release of Victor, which he insisted had surrendered and should thus be handed over to the blockade squadron as a prize. Duperré refused to consider the request. One French ship had failed to enter the channel off Grand Port: the captured East Indiaman Windham. Early on 21 August, her French commander attempted to shelter in Rivière Noire. Sirius spotted the merchant ship under the batteries there and sent two boats into the anchorage, stormed the ship, and brought her out without a single casualty, despite the boarding party having forgotten to take any weapons with them and being only armed with wooden foot-stretchers wielded as clubs.

== Battle ==
Plan of the battle. French ships are in blue, British in red.

From prisoners captured on Windham, Pym learned of the nature and situation of Duperré's squadron and sent orders to Port Napoleon with Captain Lucius Curtis in the recently arrived HMS Magicienne for Iphigenia to join Sirius and Néréide off Grand Port. Sirius and Néréide met on the morning of 22 August, Willoughby welcoming Pym with signals describing an "enemy of inferior force". Although Duperré's squadron was technically weaker than the four British frigates combined, Willoughby's signal was misleading, as the French had taken up a strong crescent-shaped battleline in the bay and could cover the mouth of the channel through which the British ships could only pass one at a time. Duperré also anticipated the arrival of reinforcements from Port Napoleon under Governor Charles Decaen at any time and could call on the support of soldiers and gun batteries on shore. In addition, French launches had moved the buoys marking the channel through the coral reef to confuse any British advance.

=== British attack ===
On 22 August, at 2:40 pm, Pym led an attack on Duperré's squadron without waiting for Iphigenia and Magicienne, entering the channel that led to the anchorage at Grand Port. He was followed by Néréide, but Willoughby had refused to allow Pym to embark the harbour pilot, the only person in the British squadron who knew the passage through the reefs. Without guidance by an experienced pilot, Sirius was aground within minutes and could not be brought off until 8:30 am on 23 August. Néréide anchored nearby during the night to protect the flagship. At 10:00 am, Iphigenia and Magicienne arrived and at 2:40 pm, after a conference between the captains as to the best course of action, the force again attempted to negotiate the channel. Although the squadron was now guided by Néréide's pilot, Sirius again grounded at 3:00 pm and Magicienne 15 minutes later after over-correcting to avoid the reef that Sirius had struck. Néréide and Iphigenia continued the attack, Iphigenia engaging Minerve and Ceylon at close range and Néréide attacking Bellone. Long-range fire from Magicienne was also directed at Victor, which was firing on Néréide.

Within minutes of the British attack, Ceylon surrendered and boats from Magicienne sought but failed to take possession of her. The French crew drove the captured East Indiaman on shore, joined shortly afterwards by Minerve, Bellone, and later by Victor, so that by 6:30 pm the entire French force was grounded and all but Bellone prevented from firing their main broadsides by beached ships blocking their arc of fire. Bellone was ideally positioned to maintain her fire on Néréide from her beached position, and at 7:00 pm a cannon shot cut Néréide's stern anchor cable. The British frigate swung around, presenting her stern to Bellone and pulling both her broadsides away from the French squadron. Raked by Bellone and desperate to return fire, Willoughby had the bow anchor cable cut, bringing a portion of his ship's starboard broadside to bear on Bellone. At 8:00 pm, Duperré was seriously wounded in the cheek by shrapnel from grapeshot fired by Néréide; Ensign Vigoureux concealed his unconscious body under a signal flag and discreetly brought him below decks while Bouvet assumed command of the French squadron on board Bellone, placing Lieutenant Albin Roussin in charge of Minerve. Building an improvised bridge between the French ships and the shore, Bouvet increased the men and ammunition reaching Bellone and thus significantly increased her rate of fire. He also had the rail removed between the foredeck and the quarterdeck of Minerve, and had iron hooks nailed to the freeboard below the starboard gangway so as to provide attachment points for additional guns, thus building a continuous second deck on his frigate where he constituted a complete second battery. By 10:00 pm Néréide was a wreck, receiving shot from several sides, with most of her guns dismounted and casualties mounting to over 200: the first lieutenant was dying, the second was severely wounded, and Willoughby's left eye had been dislodged from its socket by a wooden splinter. Recognising her battered state, Bouvet then diverted fire from Néréide to concentrate on Magicienne.

Refusing to surrender until all options had been exhausted, Willoughby dispatched boats to Sirius, asking Pym if he believed it would be practical to send boats to tow Néréide out of range. Pym replied that with the boats engaged in attempting to tow Sirius and Magicienne off the reef it was not possible to deploy them under fire to tow Néréide. Pym also suggested that Willoughby disembark his men and set fire to his ship in the hope that the flames would spread to the French ships clustered on shore. Willoughby refused this suggestion as it was not practical to disembark the dozens of wounded men aboard Néréide in the growing darkness and refused to personally abandon his men when Pym ordered him to transfer to Sirius. At 11:00 pm, Willoughby ordered a boat to row to Bellone and notify the French commander that he had surrendered. Willoughby's boat had been holed by shot and was unable to make the short journey. The message was instead conveyed by French prisoners from Néréide who had dived overboard and reached the shore during the night. Recalling the false flags used on 20 August, Bouvet resolved to wait until morning before accepting the surrender.

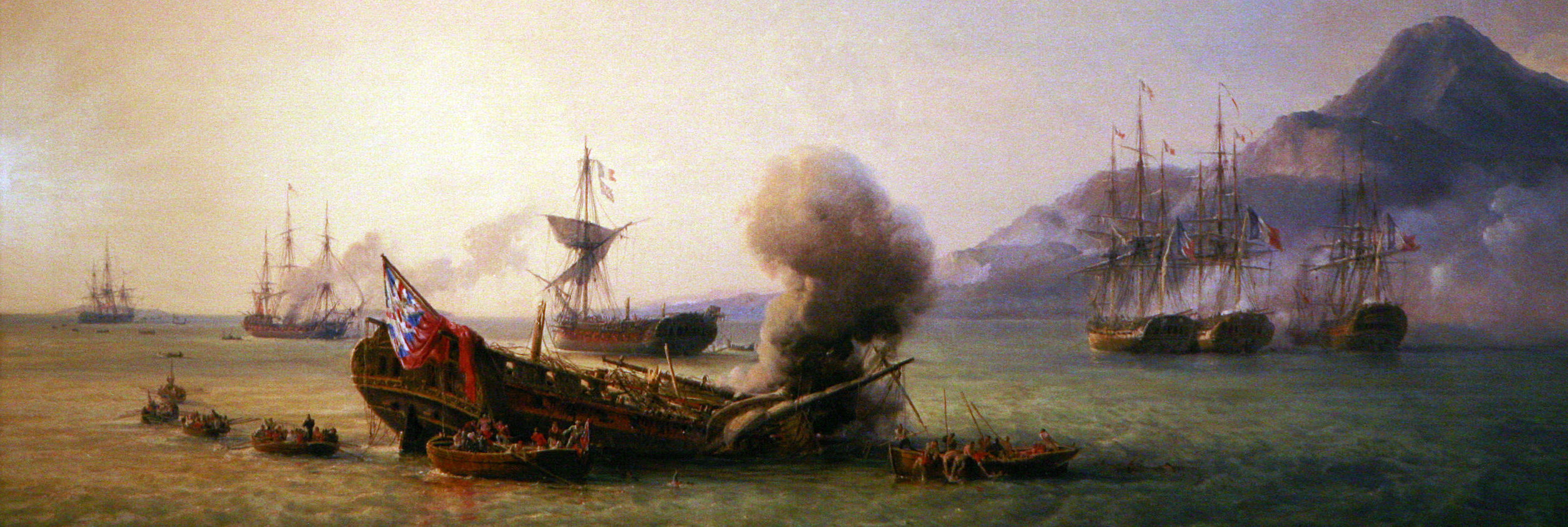
Detail from Combat de Grand Port by Pierre-Julien Gilbert. Visible from left to right: HMS Iphigenia (seen striking her colours), HMS Magicienne and HMS Sirius being set on fire by their crews, HMS Nereide surrendering, French frigate Bellone, Minerve, Victor (in the background), and Ceylon. Many of the details shown in the painting did not happen simultaneously, but were spread over several days.

=== Attempted withdrawal ===
At 1:50 am on 24 August, Bellone ceased firing on the shattered Néréide. During the remaining hours of darkness, Pym continued his efforts to dislodge Sirius from the reef and sent orders to Lambert, whose Iphigenia had been blocked from firing on the French by Néréide and also prevented from pursuing the Minerve by a large reef blocking access to the beach. With Iphigenia now becalmed in the coastal waters, Pym instructed Lambert to begin warping his ship out of the harbour, using anchors attached to the capstan to drag the ship slowly through the shallow water. Magicienne, like Iphigenia, had been stranded out of range of the beached French ships and so had instead directed her fire against a battery erected on shore, which she had destroyed by 2:00 am. When daylight came, it showed a scene of great confusion, with Sirius and Magicienne grounded in the approaches to the harbour, the French ships "on shore in a heap" in the words of Pym, Iphigenia slowly pulling herself away from the French squadron and Néréide lying broken and battered under the guns of Bellone, a Union Flag nailed to her masthead. This flag prompted a fresh burst of cannon fire from Bouvet, and it was not until Willoughby ordered the mizzenmast to be chopped down that the French acknowledged the surrender and ceased firing.

At 7:00 am, Lambert notified Pym that he had cleared the reef separating Iphigenia from the French ships and suggested that if Pym sent reinforcements from Sirius he might be able to board and capture the entire French squadron. Pym refused permission, insisting that Lambert instead assist him in pulling Sirius off the reef. Although Lambert intended to subsequently attack the French alone, Pym forbade him and sent a direct order for Lambert to move out of range of the enemy. At 10:00 am, Iphigenia reached Sirius and together the ships began firing at French troops ashore, who were endeavouring to raise a gun battery within range of the frigates. Magicienne, irretrievably stuck on the reef, rapidly flooding, and with her capstan smashed by French shot, now bore the brunt of long-range French fire from both Bellone and the shore until Pym ordered Curtis to abandon his ship, transferring his men aboard Iphigenia. At 7:30 pm, Magicienne was set on fire, her magazines exploding at 11:00 pm. On the shoreline, Duperré had been unable to spare any men to take possession of Néréide until 3:00 pm. A party under Lieutenant Roussin, second in command on Victor and temporarily in command of Minerve, was sent but had orders to return once the ship had been disarmed: freeing the remaining French prisoners, Roussin spiked the guns to prevent their further use, administered basic medical care, and returned to shore, recounting that over 100 men lay dead or dying aboard the British frigate.

At 4:00 am on 25 August, the newly erected French gun battery opened fire on Sirius and Iphigenia, which returned fire as best they could. Accepting that Sirius was beyond repair, Pym removed all her personnel and military supplies, setting fire to the frigate at 9:00 am, shortly after Iphigenia had pulled beyond the range of the battery, using a cannon as an anchor after losing hers the previous day. French boats attempted to reach Sirius and capture her before she exploded, although they turned back when Pym launched his own boats to contest possession of the wreck. The frigate's remaining munitions exploded at 11:00 am. During the morning, Duperré sent an official boarding party aboard Néréide, who wet the decks to prevent any risk of fire from the ships burning in the harbour and removed 75 corpses from the frigate.

=== French response ===
When news of the arrival of Duperré's squadron reached Decaen at Port Napoleon, he immediately despatched fast couriers to Grand Port and ordered Hamelin's squadron, consisting of the frigates Vénus, Manche, Astrée, and the brig Entreprenant, to make ready to sail in support of Duperré. Hamelin departed Port Napoleon at midnight on 21 August, intending to sail northeast and then south, down the island's eastern shore. On 23 August, Hamelin's squadron spotted and captured a British transport ship named Ranger, sent 24 days earlier from the Cape of Good Hope with 300 tons of food supplies and extensive naval stores for Rowley on Isle Bourbon. On rounding the northern headlands of Isle de France, Hamelin found he could make no progress against the headwinds and reversed direction, passing the western shore of the island and arriving off Grand Port at 1:00 pm on 27 August.

The two extra days Hamelin had spent rounding Isle de France saw activity from the British forces remaining at Grand Port. There had been no strong winds in the bay and Iphigenia was forced to resort to slowly warping towards the mouth of the channel in the hope of escaping the approaching French reinforcements. Boats had removed the crews of Sirius and Magicienne to Île de la Passe, where the fortifications had been strengthened, but supplies were running low and Magicienne's launch was sent to Isle Bourbon to request urgent reinforcement and resupply from Rowley's remaining squadron. On the morning of 27 August, Lambert discovered the brig Entreprenant off the harbour mouth and three French sail approaching in the distance. Iphigenia was still 1.2 kilometres (3/4 mi) from Île de Passe at the edge of the lagoon and was low on shot and unable to manoeuvre in the calm weather without anchors. Recognising that resistance under such conditions against an overwhelming force was futile, Lambert negotiated with Hamelin, offering to surrender Île de la Passe if Iphigenia and the men on the island were given permission to sail to Isle Bourbon unmolested.

=== British surrender ===
On the morning of 28 August, Lambert received a message from Hamelin, promising to release all the prisoners under conditions of parole within one month if Île de la Passe and Iphigenia were both surrendered without resistance. The message also threatened that if Lambert refused, the French would attack and overwhelm the badly outnumbered British force. Recognising that food supplies were low, reinforcements had not arrived and that his ammunition stores were almost empty, Lambert agreed to the terms. Lambert later received a message from Decaen proposing similar terms and notified the French governor that he had surrendered to Hamelin. Decaen was furious that Hamelin had agreed terms without consulting him, but eventually agreed to accept the terms of the surrender as well. The wounded were treated by French doctors at Grand Port and later repatriated, although the remainder of the prisoners were placed in a cramped and unpleasant prison at Port Napoleon from which, despite the terms of the surrender, they were not released until British forces captured the island in December.

Rowley first learned of the operations off Grand Port on 22 August, when Windham arrived off Saint Paul. Eager to support Pym's attack, Rowley immediately set sail in his frigate HMS Boadicea, with the transport Bombay following with two companies of the 86th Regiment of Foot to provide a garrison on any territory seized in the operation. The headwinds were strong and it was not until 29 August that Rowley arrived off Grand Port, having been notified of the situation there by Magicienne's launch the previous day. Sighting a cluster of frigates around Île de la Passe, Rowley closed with the island before turning sharply when Vénus and Manche raised their colours and gave chase. Rowley repeatedly feinted towards the French ships and then pulled away, hoping to draw them away from Grand Port in the hope that Bombay might board the now unprotected Iphigenia and capture her. Bombay was thwarted by the reappearance of Astrée and Entreprenant and Rowley was chased by Vénus and Manche back to Saint Denis, anchoring there on 30 August. Rowley attempted a second time to rescue Iphigenia from Grand Port the following week, but by the time he returned Bellone and Minerve had been refloated and the French force was far too strong for Rowley's flagship to attack alone.

== Aftermath ==
The battle is noted as the most significant defeat for the Royal Navy during the Napoleonic Wars. Not only had four frigates been lost with their entire crews, but 105 experienced sailors had been killed and 168 wounded in one of the bloodiest frigate encounters of the war. French losses were also heavy, with Duperré reporting 36 killed and 112 wounded on his squadron and among the soldiers firing from the shore.

The loss of such a large proportion of his force placed Rowley at a significant disadvantage in September, as Hamelin's squadron, bolstered by the newly commissioned Iphigénie, now substantially outnumbered his own (the ruined Néréide was also attached to the French squadron, but the damage suffered was so severe that the ship never sailed again). Withdrawing to Isle de France, Rowley requested that reinforcements be diverted from other duties in the region to replace his lost ships and to break the French blockade of Isle Bourbon, led by Bouvet. These newly arrived British frigates, cruising alone in unfamiliar waters, became targets for Hamelin, who twice forced the surrender of single frigates, only for Rowley to beat his ships away from their prize each time. On the second occasion, Rowley was able to chase and capture Hamelin and his flagship Vénus, bringing an end to his raiding career and to the activities of his squadron, who remained on Isle de France until they were all captured at the fall of the island in December by an invasion fleet under Vice-Admiral Albemarle Bertie.

In France the action was greeted with celebration, and it became the only naval battle commemorated on the Arc de Triomphe. The British response was despondent, although all four captains were subsequently cleared and praised at their courts-martial inquiring into the loss of their ships. The only criticism was of Willoughby, who was accused of giving a misleading signal in indicating that the French were of inferior force on 22 August. Contemporary historian William James described British reaction to the battle as "that the noble behaviour of her officers and crew threw such a halo of glory around the defeat at Grand Port, that, in public opinion at least, the loss of four frigates was scarcely considered a misfortune." He also notes that "No case of which we are aware more deeply affects the character of the Royal Navy than the defeat it sustained at Grand Port." On 30 December 1899, a monument was erected at the harbour of Grand Port in the memory of the British and French sailors who were killed in the engagement.

== In literature ==
The battle attracted the attention of authors from both Britain and France, featuring in the 1843 novel Georges by Alexandre Dumas, "Dead Reckoning" by C. Northcote Parkinson and the 1977 novel The Mauritius Command by Patrick O'Brian.

== Monuments ==
On 30 December 1899, a monument was erected at the harbour of Grand Port in the memory of the British and French sailors who were killed in the engagement.

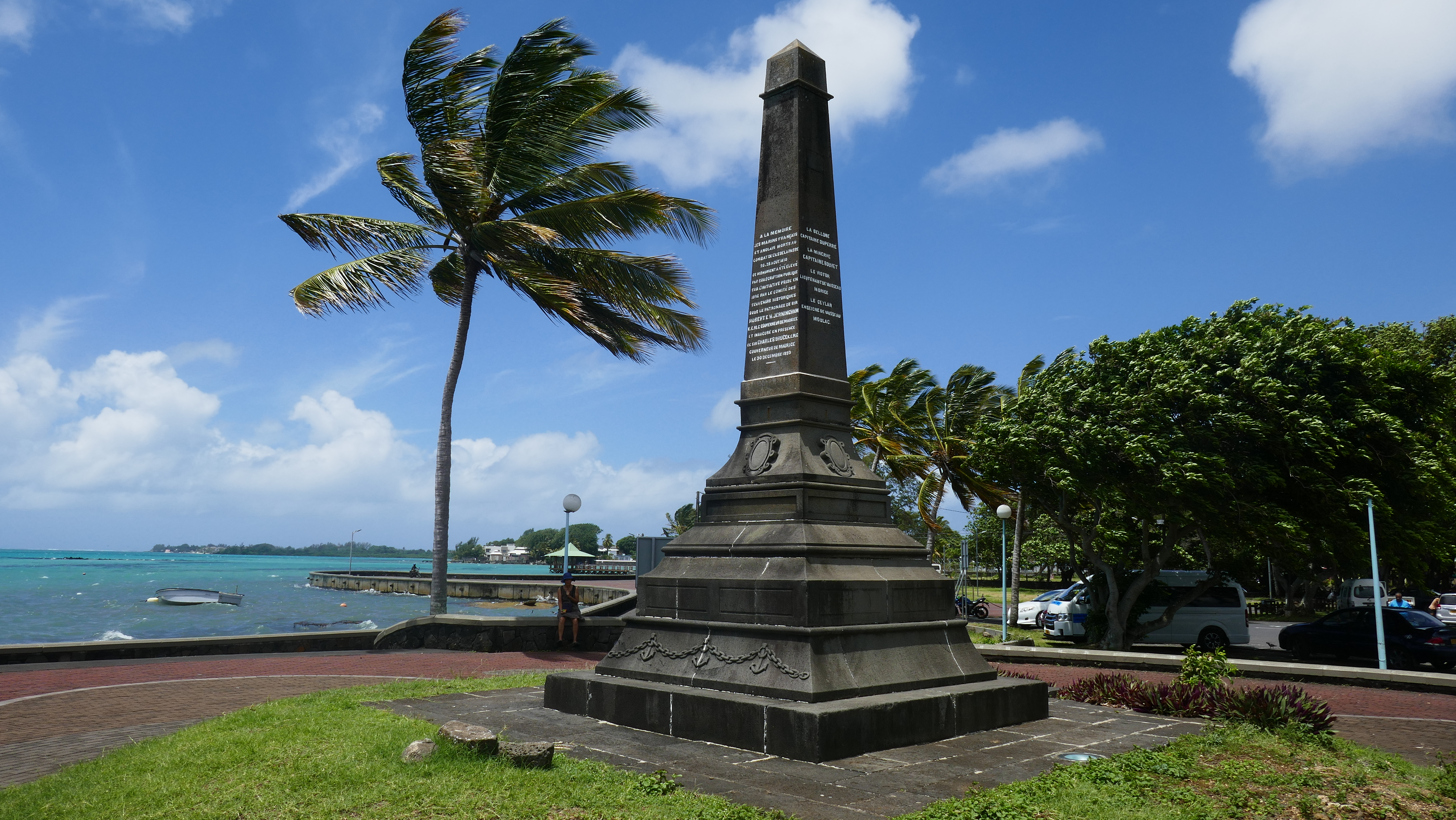
Grand Port in 2023, the memorial to the battle.

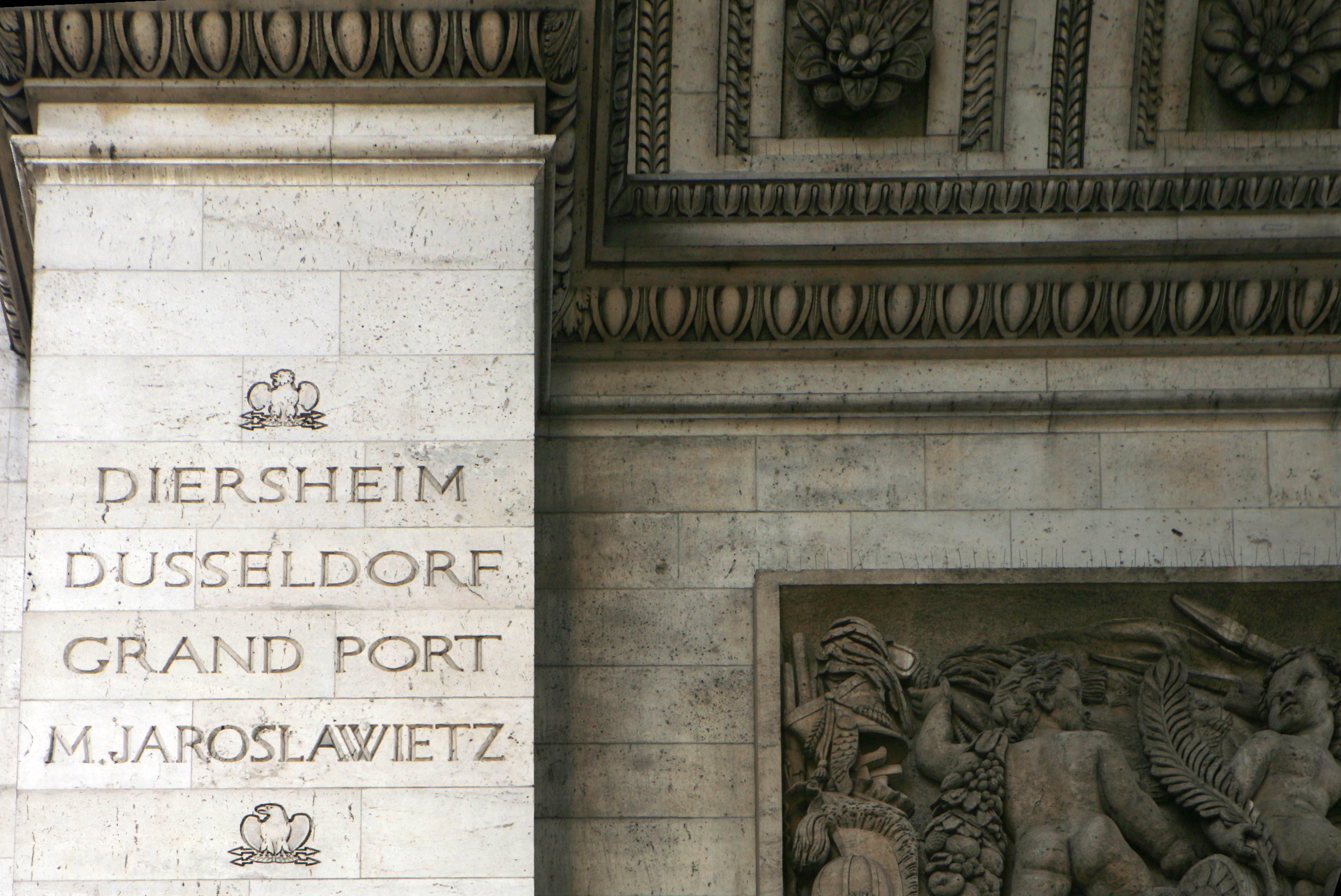
Inscription celebrating the battle on the Arc de Triomphe

== Order of battle ==
Captain Pym's squadron
Ship	Rate	Guns	Navy	Commander	Casualties			Notes
Ship	Rate	Guns	Navy	Commander	Killed	Wounded	Total	Notes
HMS Sirius	Fifth-rate	36		Captain Samuel Pym	0	0	0	Scuttled to avoid capture.
HMS Iphigenia	Fifth-rate	36		Captain Henry Lambert	5	13	18	Surrendered on 27 August
HMS Nereide	Fifth-rate	32		Captain Nesbit Willoughby	92	130	222	Surrendered on 24 August
HMS Magicienne	Fifth-rate	32		Captain Lucius Curtis	8	20	28	Scuttled to avoid capture
Casualties: 105 killed, 163 wounded, 268 total, all survivors captured (Note: The British total does not include the 13 killed and 33 wounded in preliminary actions between 10 and 20 August.)

Captain Duperré's squadron
Ship	Rate	Guns	Navy	Commander	Casualties			Notes
Ship	Rate	Guns	Navy	Commander	Killed	Wounded	Total	Notes
Bellone	Fifth-rate	40	France	Captain Guy-Victor Duperré	13	35	48	
Minerve	Fifth-rate	48	France	Captain Pierre Bouvet	15	42	57	
Victor	Corvette	18	France	Lieutenant Nicolas Morice; Replaced by Henri Moisson	4	1	5	
Ceylan (Note: Ceylon had been renamed Ceylan by the French after her capture at the action of 3 July 1810 (Troude, op. cit., p. 90))	Captured East Indiaman	26	France	Lieutenant Vincent Moulac	4	19	23	
Windham	Captured East Indiaman	26	France	Ensign d'Arod	0	0	0	Captured by HMS Sirius on 21 August
Casualties: 36 killed, 112 wounded (Note: The French total does not include those killed or wounded in preliminary actions between 10 and 20 August, but does include 15 personnel wounded on shore during the battle.)
Commodore Hamelin's reinforcements
Vénus	Fifth-rate	40	France	Commodore Jacques Hamelin	—	—	—	
Manche	Fifth-rate	40	France	Captain Jean Dornal de Guy	—	—	—	
Astrée	Fifth-rate	40	France	Captain René Le Marant	—	—	—	
Entreprenant	Brig	16	France	Captain Pierre Bouvet	—	—	—	
Sources: Macmillan pp. 29–37, James pp. 273–289

== Bibliography ==
- Clowes, William Laird (1997) [1900]. The Royal Navy, A History from the Earliest Times to 1900, Volume V. Chatham Publishing. ISBN 1-86176-014-0.
- Gardiner, Robert, ed. (2001) [1998]. The Victory of Seapower. Caxton Editions. ISBN 1-84067-359-1.
- Granier, Hubert (1998). Histoire des Marins français 1789–1815. illustrations by Alain Coz. Marines éditions. ISBN 2-909675-41-6.
- James, William (2002) [1827]. The Naval History of Great Britain, Volume 5, 1808–1811. Conway Maritime Press. ISBN 0-85177-909-3.
- Macmillan, Allister (2000) [1914]. Mauritius Illustrated. W.H.& L. Collingridge. ISBN 978-81-206-1508-3.
- Taylor, Stephen (2007). Storm and Conquest, The Battle for the Indian Ocean, 1808–10. Faber and Faber. ISBN 978-0-571-22465-4.
- Troude, Onésime-Joachim (1867). Batailles navales de la France (in French). Vol. 4. Challamel ainé.
- Woodman, Richard (2001). The Sea Warriors. Constable Publishers. ISBN 1-84119-183-3.
