= William Pym =

British military surgeon (1772–1861)

Sir William Pym, KCH (1772 – 18 March 1861) was a pioneering British military surgeon whose work in epidemic control and battlefield medicine transformed military healthcare. Born in Edinburgh, he trained at the University of Edinburgh and served in key postings in the West Indies and Mediterranean, where his efforts in managing outbreaks such as yellow fever set new standards for military and public health practices.

== Biography ==
The son of Joseph Pym of Pinley, near Henley-in-Arden, Warwickshire, and elder brother of Sir Samuel Pym, Pym was born in Edinburgh in 1772, and was educated at the University of Edinburgh. He entered the medical department of the army after a brief period of service in the Royal Navy, and was shortly afterwards ordered to the West Indies.

In 1794 he was appointed to a flank battalion commanded by Sir Eyre Coote, in the expedition under Sir Charles (later Earl) Grey which landed at Martinique in the early part of that year. He was present at the reduction of Martinique, Saint Lucia, and Guadeloupe. The force to which he was attached suffered great hardships, but remained healthy until the fall of Fort Matilda completed the surrender of Guadeloupe, when yellow fever broke out in the 35th and 70th regiments, then stationed at Saint-Pierre, Martinique. Pym was ordered to take medical charge through the outbreak, which lasted from 1794 to 1796, when it is estimated that nearly sixteen thousand troops died. Pym thus obtained an unparalleled knowledge of yellow fever.

Pym served in Sicily on his return from the West Indies, and in 1806 he was shipwrecked in the Athénienne between Sicily and Africa. In this wreck 349 persons perished out of a crew of 476, and the few survivors owed their safety in great measure to the activity and resources of Pym. He was transferred from Sicily to Malta, and afterwards to Gibraltar, where he acted as confidential medical adviser to the governor, the Duke of Kent. He was also appointed superintendent of quarantine. He became deputy inspector-general of army hospitals on 20 December 1810, and in the following year the Earl of Liverpool (the Prime Minister) sent him back to Malta as President of the Board of Health, a position he filled with conspicuous success. He returned to England in 1812 and lived in London, but in 1813 he volunteered to return to Malta once again, where the plague was raging. He was appointed Inspector-General of Army Hospitals on 25 September 1816.

In 1815 Pym published an account of yellow fever under the title of Observations upon Bulam Fever, proving it to be a highly contagious disease. This is the first clear account of the disease now known as yellow fever. In this work Pym maintains:

1. that it is a disease sui generis known by the name of African, yellow, or bulam fever, and is the 'vómito prieto' of the Spaniards, being attended with that peculiar and fatal symptom the 'black vomit';
2. that it is highly infectious;
3. that its infectious powers are increased by heat and destroyed by cold;
4. that it attacks natives of warm climates in a comparatively mild form;
5. that it has also a singular and peculiar character, attacking, as in a case of smallpox, the human frame only once.

The work excited violent opposition at the time, but it is now generally conceded that Pym's views are substantially correct. In Observations upon Bulam, Vómito-negro, or Yellow Fever (1848), which is practically a second edition of the previous work, Pym contends that the question is no longer one of contagion or non-contagion, as it was in 1815, but whether there are two different and distinct diseases – viz. the remittent and non-contagious, which prevails at all times on the coast of Africa; and the other, the bulam or vómito-negro fever, which only occasionally makes its appearance, and is highly contagious.

In 1826 Pym was made Superintendent-General of Quarantine, and, in that capacity, took every opportunity of relieving the existing stringency of the laws of quarantine. His services were recognised in a treasury minute dated December 1855. He proceeded to Gibraltar in 1828 to control and superintend the quarantine arrangements during an outbreak of yellow fever.

Upon his return to England Pym was invested by William IV a Knight Bachelor in 1830 and a Knight Commander of the Royal Guelphic Order in 1831. Pym was a chairman of the Central Board of Health during the cholera epidemic which attacked the United Kingdom in 1832, and for his services received a letter of thanks from the lords of the council. He died in his ninetieth year on 18 March 1861 at his house in Upper Harley Street, London.
