= Pierre-Julien Gilbert =

French painter

Pierre-Julien Gilbert (15 March 1783 – 21 September 1860) was a French painter who specialised in marine art. Gilbert was a pupil of Pierre Ozanne and Louis-Philippe Crépin. He taught painting at the École Navale from 1816 and was admitted to accompany the Navy during the Invasion of Algiers in 1830. Gilbert was professor of drawing at the Naval School of Brest.

== Gallery ==
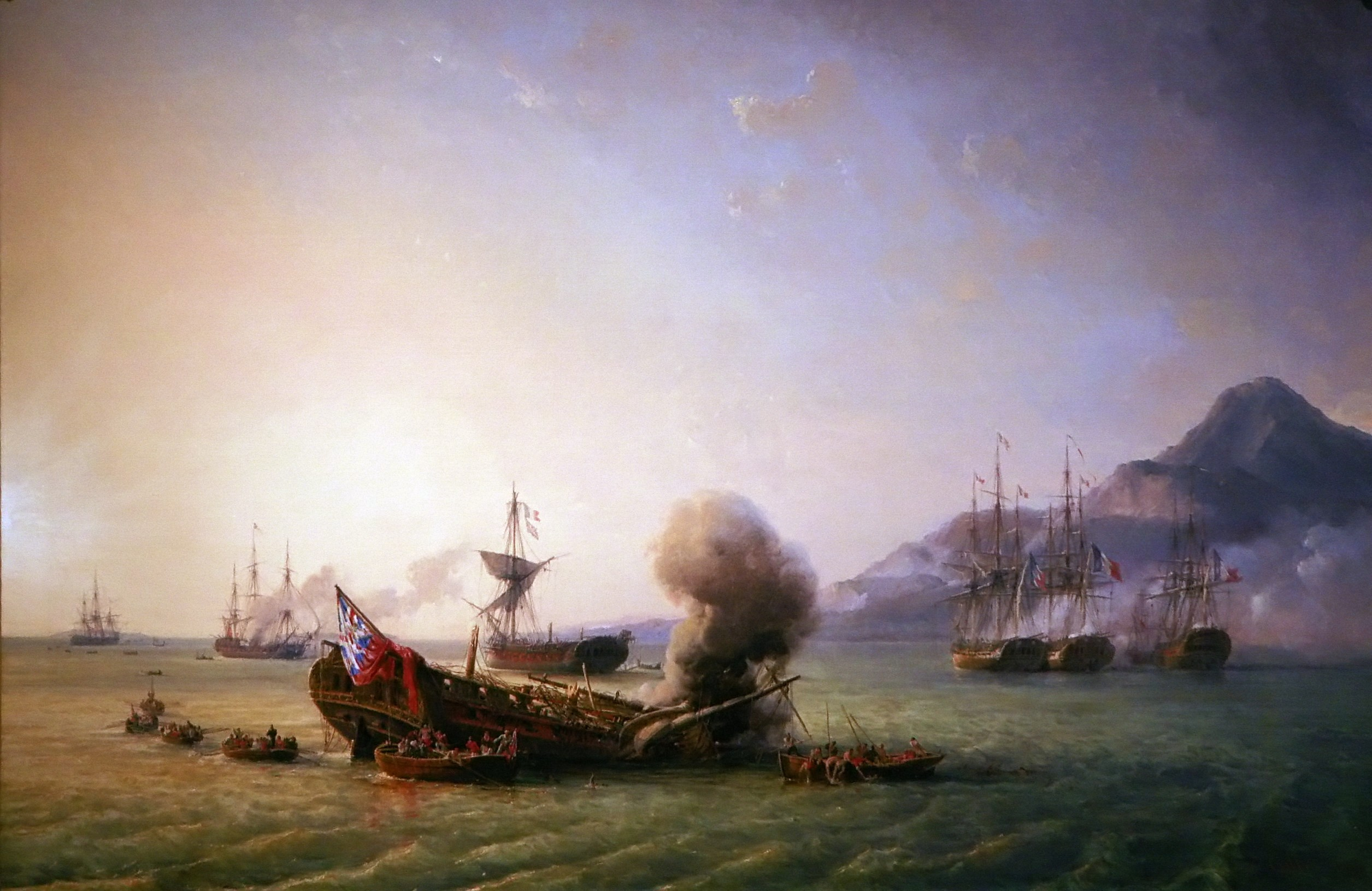
The Battle of Grand Port (Date unknown)

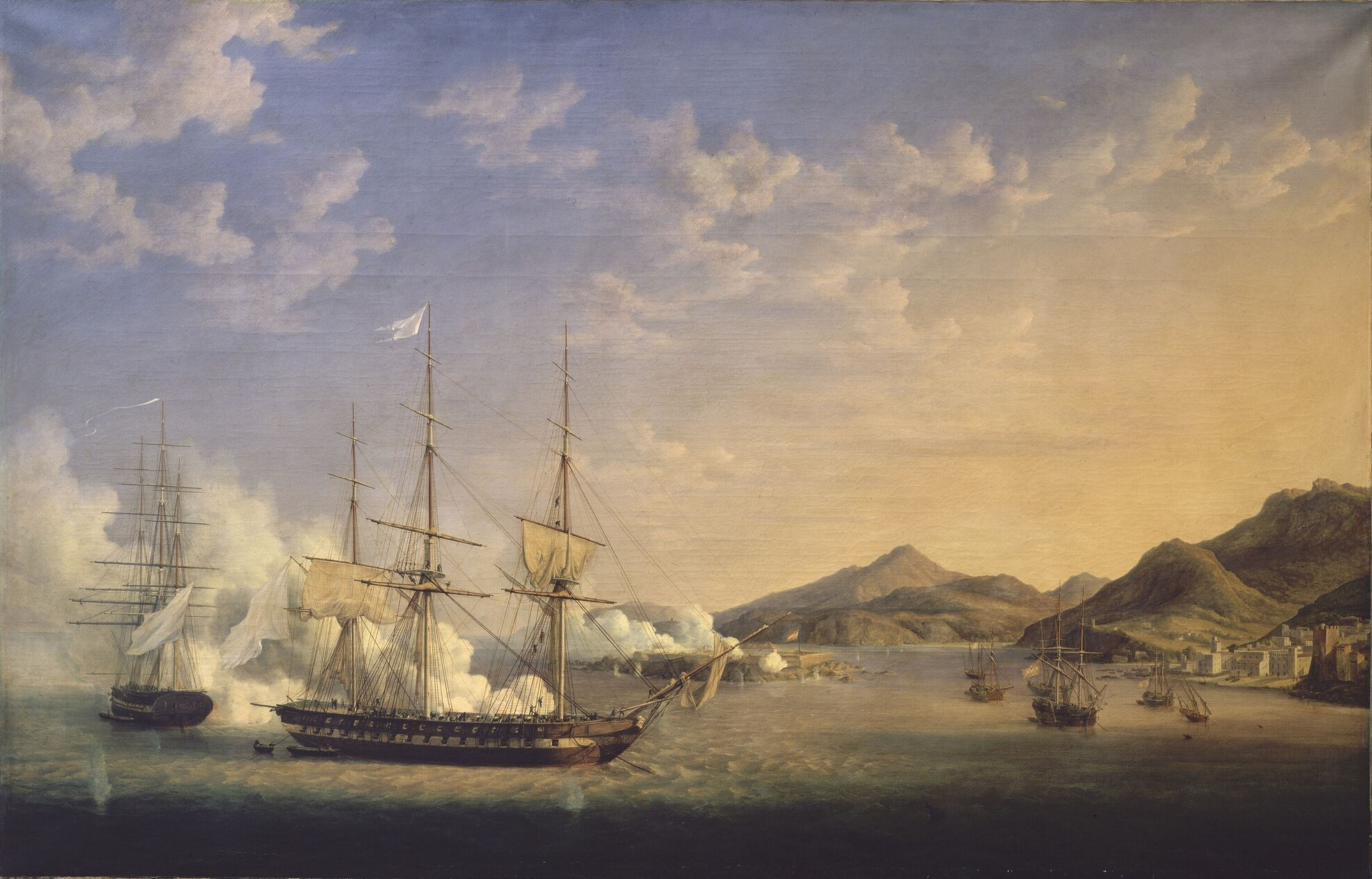
Attack and capture of the batteries of Ile-Verte, in the bay of Algeciras, by the frigates "Guerrière", of 60 guns, and "Galatée", of 44 guns, commanded by Messrs. Lemarant and Drouault, ship-of-the-line captains (1824)

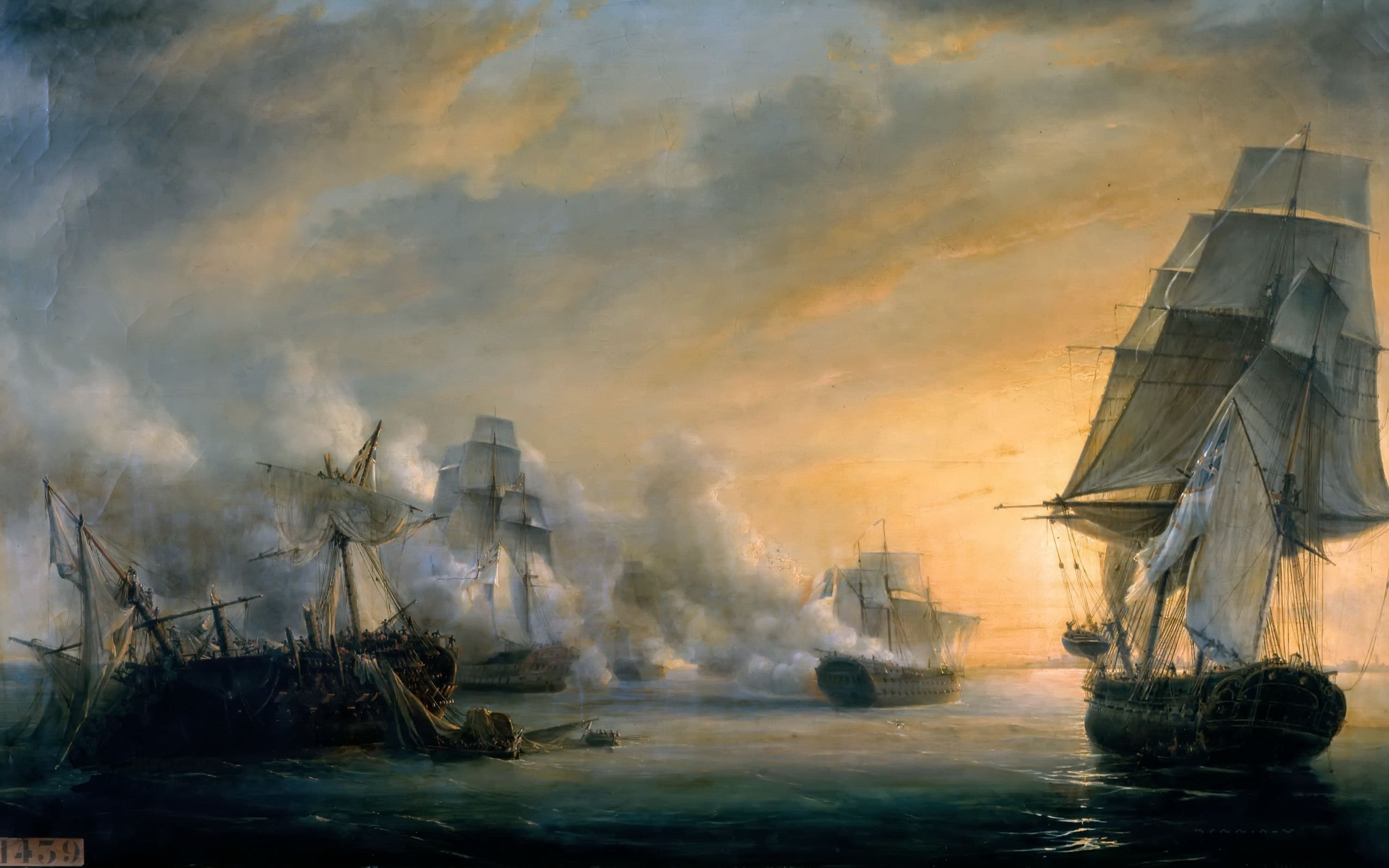
Fight of the Formidable (1832)

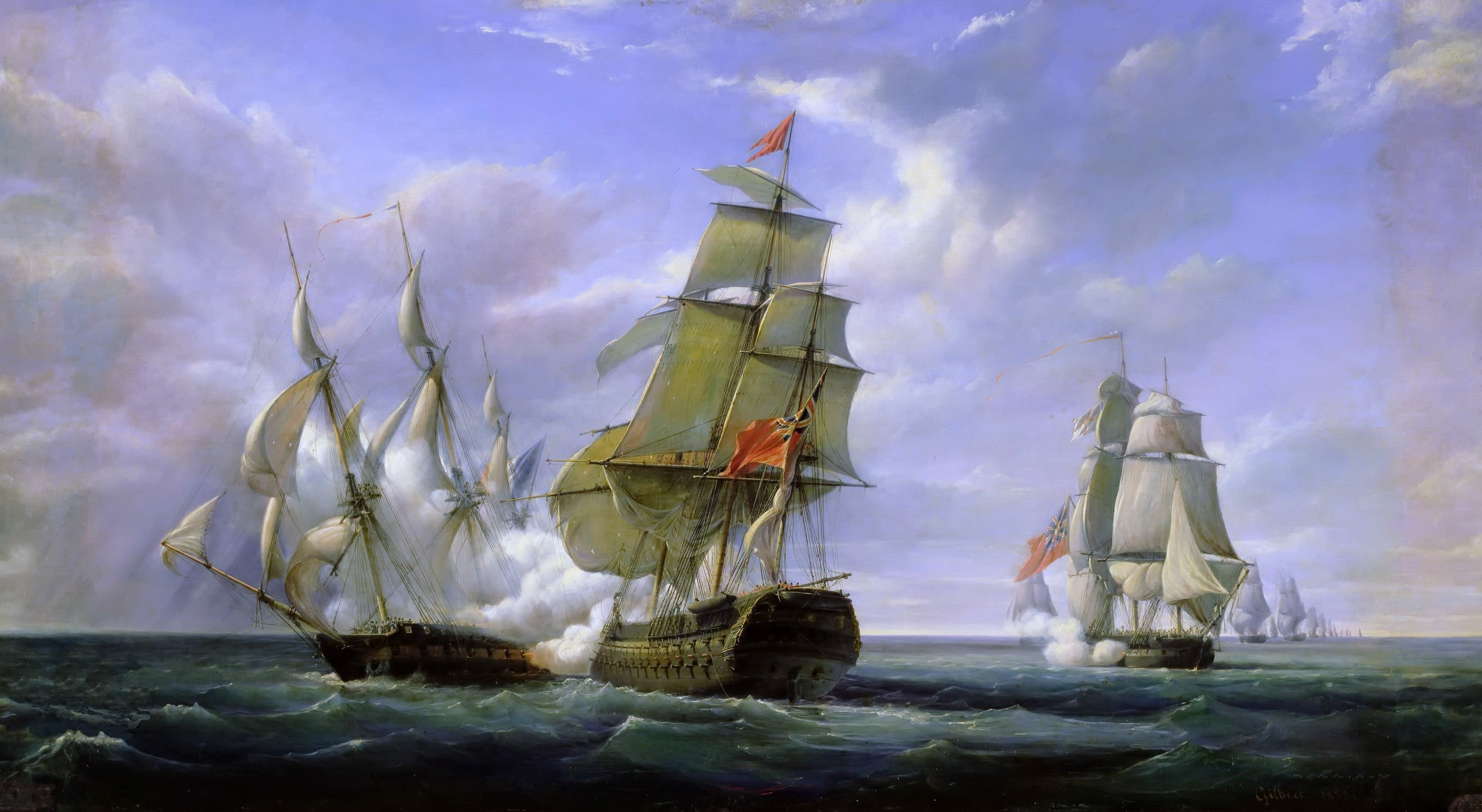
Battle of the French frigate "Canonniere" against the English ship of the line "Tremendous", on 21 April 1806 (1835)

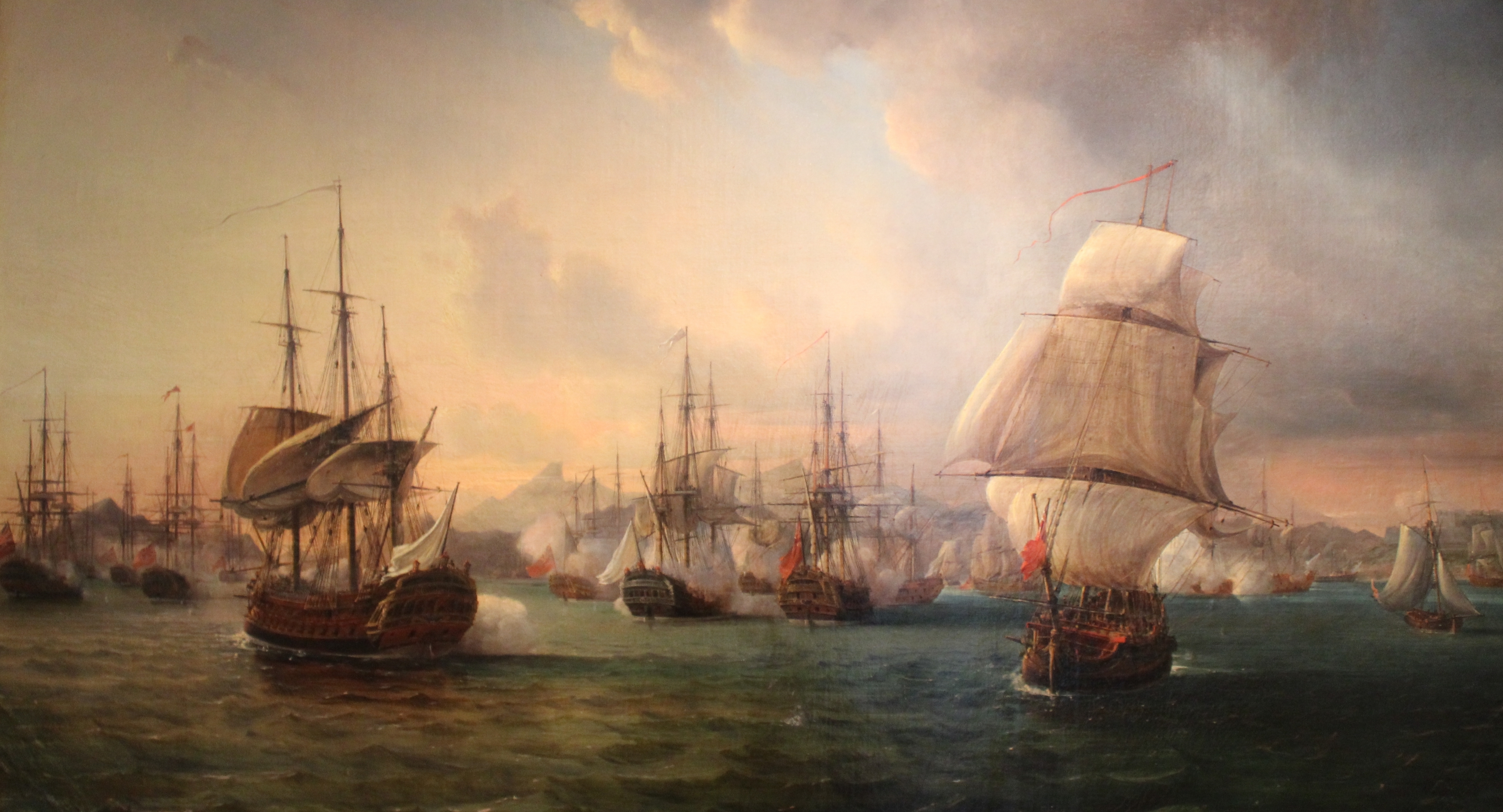
Battle of Praia Bay in Santiago Island in Cape Verde, 16 April 1781 (1836)

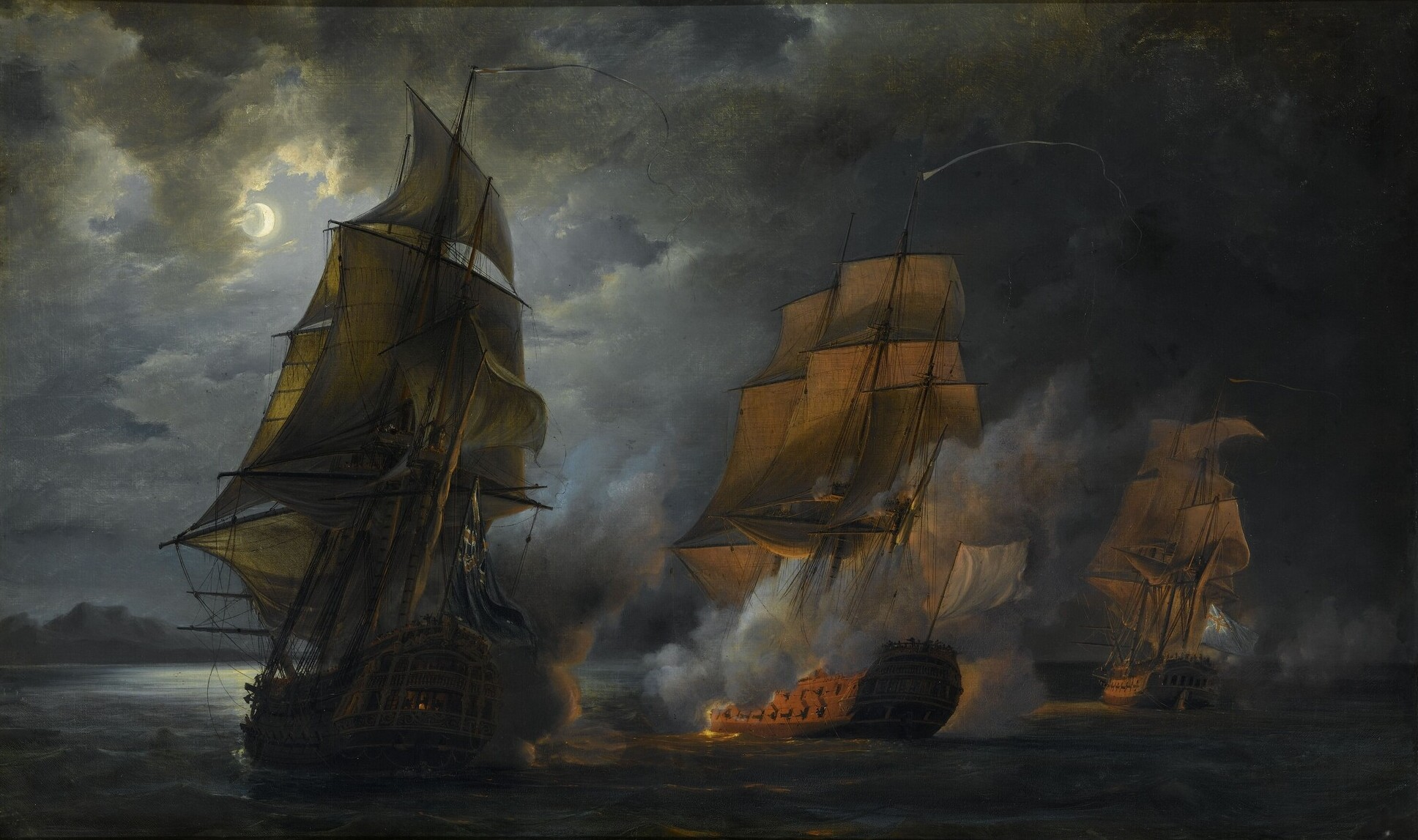
Battle of the French ship Triton against the English ship Jupiter and the English frigate Médée, 20 October 1778 (1837)

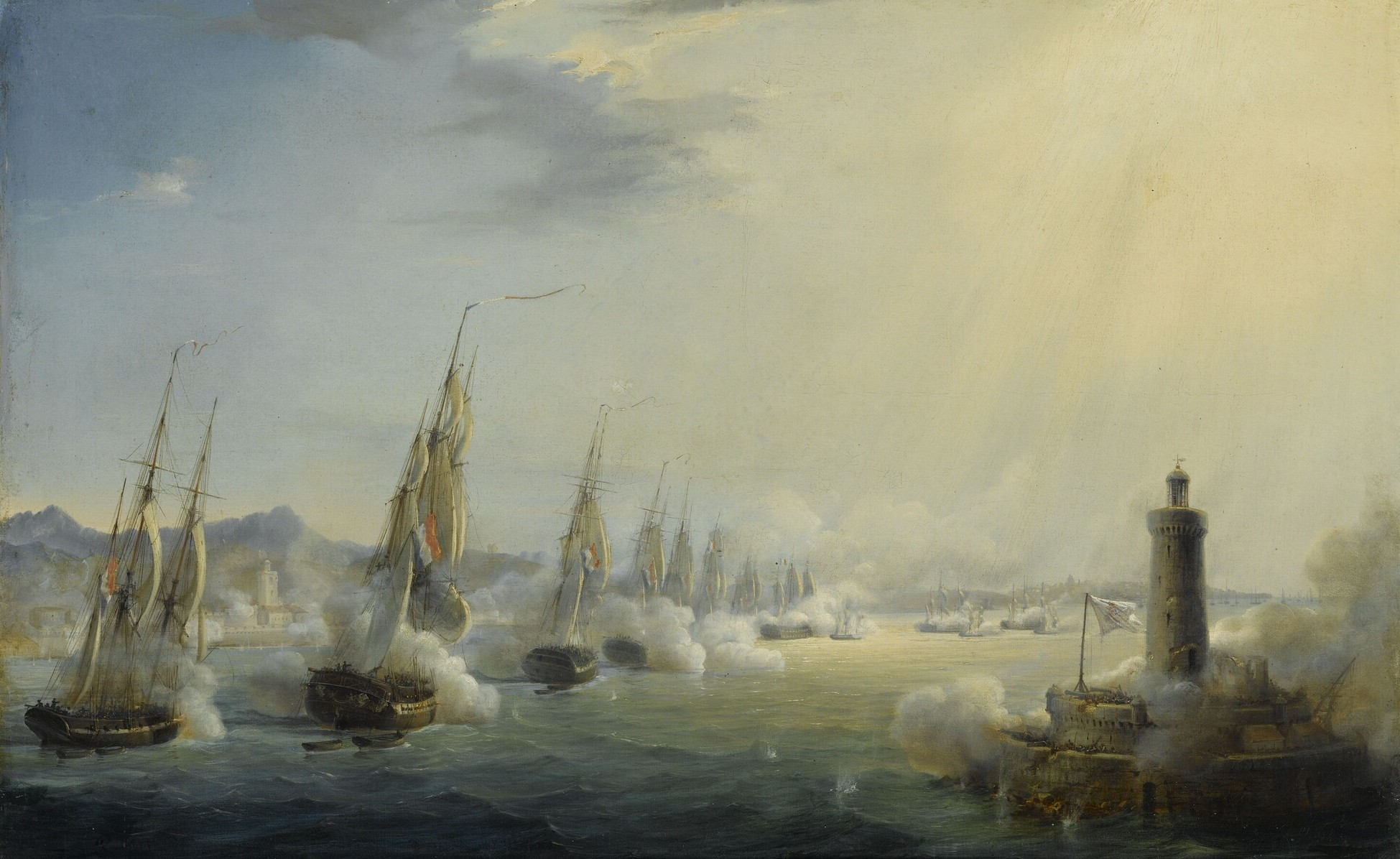
The French squadron commanded by Admiral Roussin forces the entrance to the Tagus, 11 July 1831 (1850)

== Sources and references ==
- Pierre-Julien Gilbert
- Joconde database
