= Samuel Pym =

Royal Navy officer (1778–1855)

Admiral Sir Samuel Pym KCB
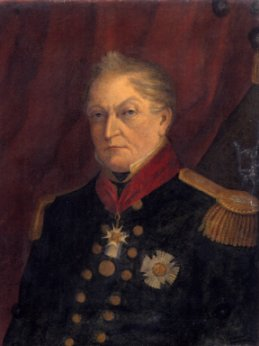
- Portrait of Pym
- Born: 1778
- Died: 2 October 1855 (aged 76–77); Southampton
- Relatives: Sir William Pym (brother)
- Military career
- Allegiance: Great Britain; United Kingdom
- Branch: Royal Navy
- Service years: 1788–1855
- Rank: Admiral
- Commands: HMS Swan; HMS Mars; HMS Atlas; HMS Sirius; HMS Hannibal; HMS Niemen; HMS Kent; Admiral-Superintendent, Plymouth; Experimental Squadron
- Conflicts: French Revolutionary Wars; Action of 16 October 1799; Napoleonic Wars; Battle of San Domingo; Raid on Saint-Paul; Invasion of Île Bonaparte; Battle of Grand Port; War of 1812
- Awards: Knight Commander of the Order of the Bath

Admiral Sir Samuel Pym KCB (1778 – 2 October 1855) was a Royal Navy officer who served in the French Revolutionary and Napoleonic Wars.

In June 1788, Pym joined the Royal Navy as captain's servant of the frigate Eurydice. He was promoted to lieutenant of the sloop Martin, under Captain William Grenville Lobb, and served under Lobb aboard the Babet and the Aimable.

From November 1798, Pym served aboard the Ethalion (36), taking part in the capture of the Spanish Thetis and Santa-Brigida in 1799. The Ethalion was wrecked on the Penmarks on Christmas Day.

From April 1804, Pym served aboard the Mars, and from June on the 74-gun Atlas, under the overall command of Sir John Thomas Duckworth. Pym was decorated after the Battle of San Domingo on 6 February 1806.

In October 1808, Pym took command of the 36-gun frigate Sirius in the squadron of Commodore Rowley.

In 1810, Pym was sent to the Isle de France (now Mauritius) to lead a squadron consisting of the frigates Sirius, Iphigenia, Nereide, and the brig Staunch. On 13 August, the squadron captured the Île de la Passe which commanded the entrance of Grand Port, and moved to blockade Port Louis. On 21 August, the squadron seized the East Indiaman Wyndham, previously captured by the French, and learnt that a French frigate squadron had arrived at Grand Port.

The British squadron attempted to attack the French squadron at anchor and moved into the harbour. Entering it, the Sirius and Magicienne ran aground and became unmanoeuverable. The Nereide struck her colours before the French frigates, and the Sirius and Magicienne were scuttled by fire. The last ship of the squadron, the Iphigenia, surrendered two days later. Pym, then at the Île de la Passe, was taken prisoner along with the whole garrison. The Battle of Grand Port became the only defeat of a British squadron against Napoleonic France. Pym was released in December when Sir Albemarle Bertie recaptured the Île de la Passe. He was court-martialled and found innocent of the defeat.

In February 1812, Pym was in command of the 74-gun ship Hannibal, off Cherbourg, in May of the Niemen, and in 1830 of HMS Kent.

Pym was made a rear-admiral in 1837. He served as admiral-superintendent at Devonport from 1841 to 1846, and in the autumn of 1845 commanded the experimental squadron in the Channel. He was promoted to vice-admiral in 1847 and to full admiral in 1851.

== See also ==
- O'Byrne, William Richard (1849). "Pym, Samuel" . A Naval Biographical Dictionary . John Murray – via Wikisource.
