= Île de la Passe (Mauritius) =

Coordinates: 20°23′56″S 57°46′02″E

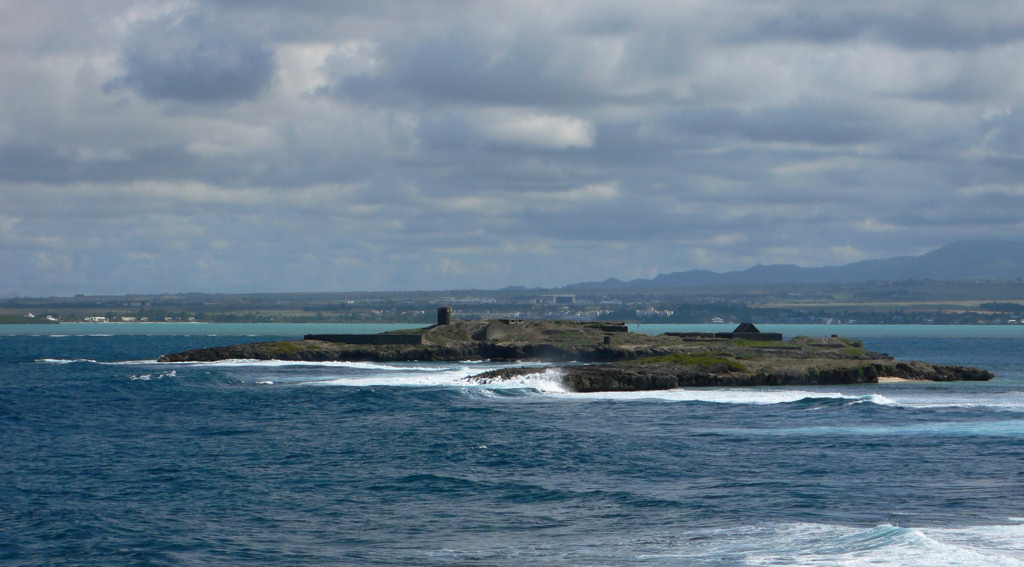
Île de la Passe.

Île de la Passe is a rocky islet in the bay off Grand Port on the island of Mauritius. Between 20 and 25 August 1810, during the British campaign to capture the island (then called Isle de France) from the French, it was the scene of the Battle of Grand Port. This was a long and very hard-fought action between roughly equal forces of French and British frigates and, on balance, a defeat for the British, who lost four frigates, though one of these was subsequently recaptured. The French squadron did not survive the British invasion of Mauritius.
