= HCS Grappler (1804) =

History

United Kingdom
- Name: Grappler
- Owner: East India Company
- Builder: A. Wadell, Kiddapore Dockyards, Calcutta
- Launched: 1804
- Captured: August or September 1806

France
- Acquired: August or September 1806 by capture
- Captured: September 1809

United Kingdom
- Captured: September 1809 by capture
- Fate: Possibly an anchor vessel on the Hooghly River

General characteristics
- Tons burthen: 150 tons
- Armament: 8 × 12-pounder carronades + 2 × 6-pounder bow chasers (originally)

HCS Grappler was a 14-gun brig of the Bombay Marine launched in 1804 at Calcutta. The French Imperial Navy captured her in 1806, but the British recaptured her in 1809. She then disappears from historical records.

== Capture by the French (1806) ==
The French frigate Piémontaise, under the command of Louis Jacques Epron, captured Grappler on 31 August 1806 or 6 September (accounts differ), off the Malabar Coast near Quilon. Grappler, under the command of Captain Ramsay, was carrying 14 cases containing 312,000 piastres.

The French granted Grappler's crew and passengers "paroles" as prisoners of war and placed them on an Arab-owned ship called the Allamany. The Allamany arrived at Madras on 15 September and then continued on to Calcutta.

== Recapture during the raid on Saint-Paul (1809) ==
The British eventually recaptured Grappler from the French in September 1809 in the daring raid on Saint-Paul on the Île de Bourbon (now Réunion) from the nearby British-held island of Rodrigues. The British force consisted of a naval squadron under Commodore Josias Rowley and an Army force under Lieutenant Colonel Henry Sheehy Keating. The Army contingent, which consisted of 368 soldiers from the 1st Battalion of the 56th Regiment of Foot under the command Keating, embarked on HMS Nereide under Captain Robert Corbet, Otter under Captain Nesbit Willoughby and the East India Company schooner Wasp under Lieutenant Watkins. The rest of Rowley's squadron, the flagship HMS Raisonnable, and the frigates HMS Sirius under Captain Samuel Pym and HMS Boadicea under Captain John Hatley joined off St. Paul. These ships contributed an additional 236 seaman volunteers and Royal Marines to the assault. The entire invasion force then embarked on Nereide, as Corbet had experience with coastline of the Île Bonaparte coastline.

On the early morning of 21 September the force seized the port of St. Paul. There they destroyed its defences and recovered a number of British vessels. Nereide and the landing party captured the 44-gun French frigate Caroline, and recovered Grappler as well as the East Indiamen Streatham (850 tons (bm) and pierced for 30 guns) and Europe (820 tons (bm) and pierced for 26 guns). The expedition also captured three small merchant vessels (Fanny of 150 tons, and Tres Amis and Creole of 60 tons each), destroyed three others, and burnt one ship that was building on the stocks. The British did not sustain any loss on board the squadron or to their vessels. The British completed the demolition of the different gun and mortar batteries and of the magazines by evening and the whole of the troops, marines, and seamen returned on board their ships.

When the British captured Grappler, they noted that although she was pierced for 16 guns, she only had 11 on board. The enumeration however, listed only nine, six 18-pounder carronades mounted and three 6-pounder guns in the hold. Lloyd's List (LL) reported on 9 January 1811 that the captured vessels, except for Europe, which had been sent to Bombay, had all arrived at the Cape of Good Hope.

== Fate ==
Details of the subsequent fate of Grappler are currently unknown. In 1835 Captain Lloyd of the Bombay Marine became the "river surveyor" for the Hooghly River. He took over all functions and had a fleet of a brig, a schooner, the anchor vessel Grappler, and four rowboats. Whether this was the same Grappler is an open question.
