= Action of 13 September 1810 =

1810 battle of the Mauritius campaign of 1809–1811

Coordinates: 21.287°S 54.757°E

- Part of the Mauritius campaign of 1809–1811
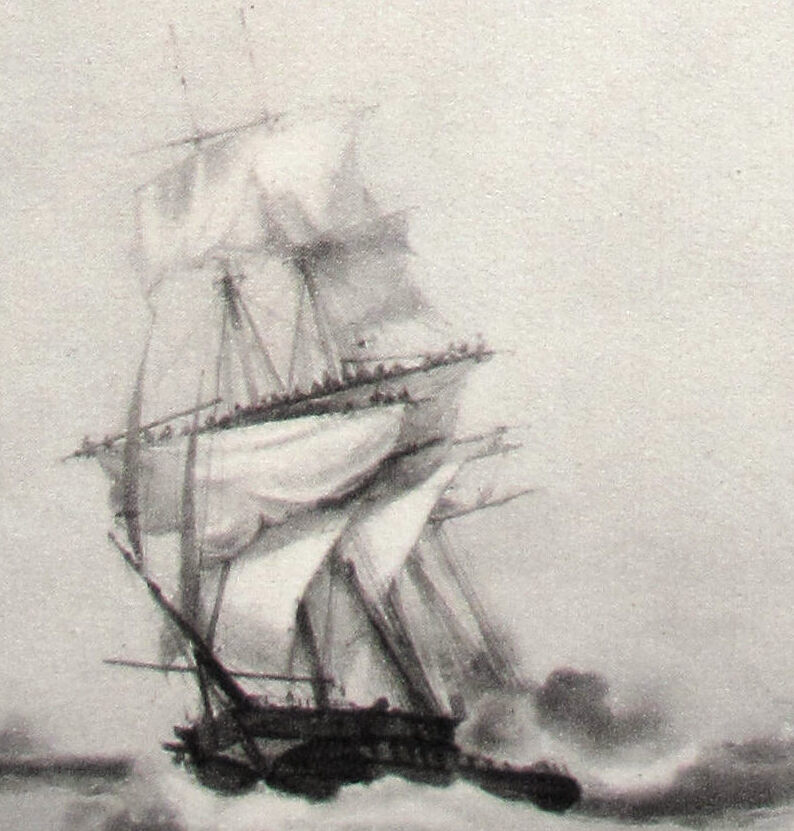
- HMS Africaine, which was captured and recaptured at the action
Date	13 September 1810
Location	Off Isle Bourbon, Indian Ocean
Result	French victory

Belligerents
France	United Kingdom; East India Company

Commanders and leaders
Pierre François Étienne Bouvet de Maisonneuve	Robert Corbet †; Josias Rowley

Strength
2 frigates	2 frigates 2 sloops-of-war 1 gun-brig

Casualties and losses
10 killed 35 wounded 10 captured	49 killed 114 wounded 1 sloop-of-war captured

The action of 13 September 1810 was an frigate engagement during the Napoleonic Wars between Royal Navy and French Imperial Navy frigates during which a British frigate was defeated by two French vessels near Isle de France (now Mauritius), but British reinforcements were able to recapture the ship before the French could secure her. The British frigate was HMS Africaine, a new arrival to the Indian Ocean. She was under the command of Captain Robert Corbet, who had served there the previous year. Corbet was a notoriously unpopular officer and his death in the battle provoked a storm of controversy in Britain over claims that Corbet had either committed suicide at the shame of losing his ship, been murdered by his disaffected crew, or been abandoned by his men, who were said to have refused to load their guns while he remained in command. Whether any of these rumours were accurate has never been satisfactorily determined, but the issue has been discussed in several prominent naval histories and was the subject of at least one lawsuit.

The action came about as a direct consequence of the Battle of Grand Port three weeks earlier, in which a British squadron had been destroyed in a failed attack on Grand Port harbour on Isle de France. This gave the French forces on the island a significant regional advantage, outnumbering the British frigate on the recently captured Isle Bourbon, commanded by Commodore Josias Rowley, by six to one. British reinforcements were hastily despatched to the area but the French were blockading Isle Bourbon in force and the arriving reinforcements were in constant danger of attack by more powerful French units. Africaine was the first ship to reinforce Rowley's squadron, but within three days of her arrival in the region was engaged by two French ships while attempting to drive them away from Saint Denis on Isle Bourbon. Corbet was severely wounded in the opening exchanges and subsequently died. Although his crew fought hard, they were overwhelmed by the French frigates and forced to surrender, only for Rowley to arrive in HMS Boadicea and drive off the French warships, recapturing Africaine.

== Background ==
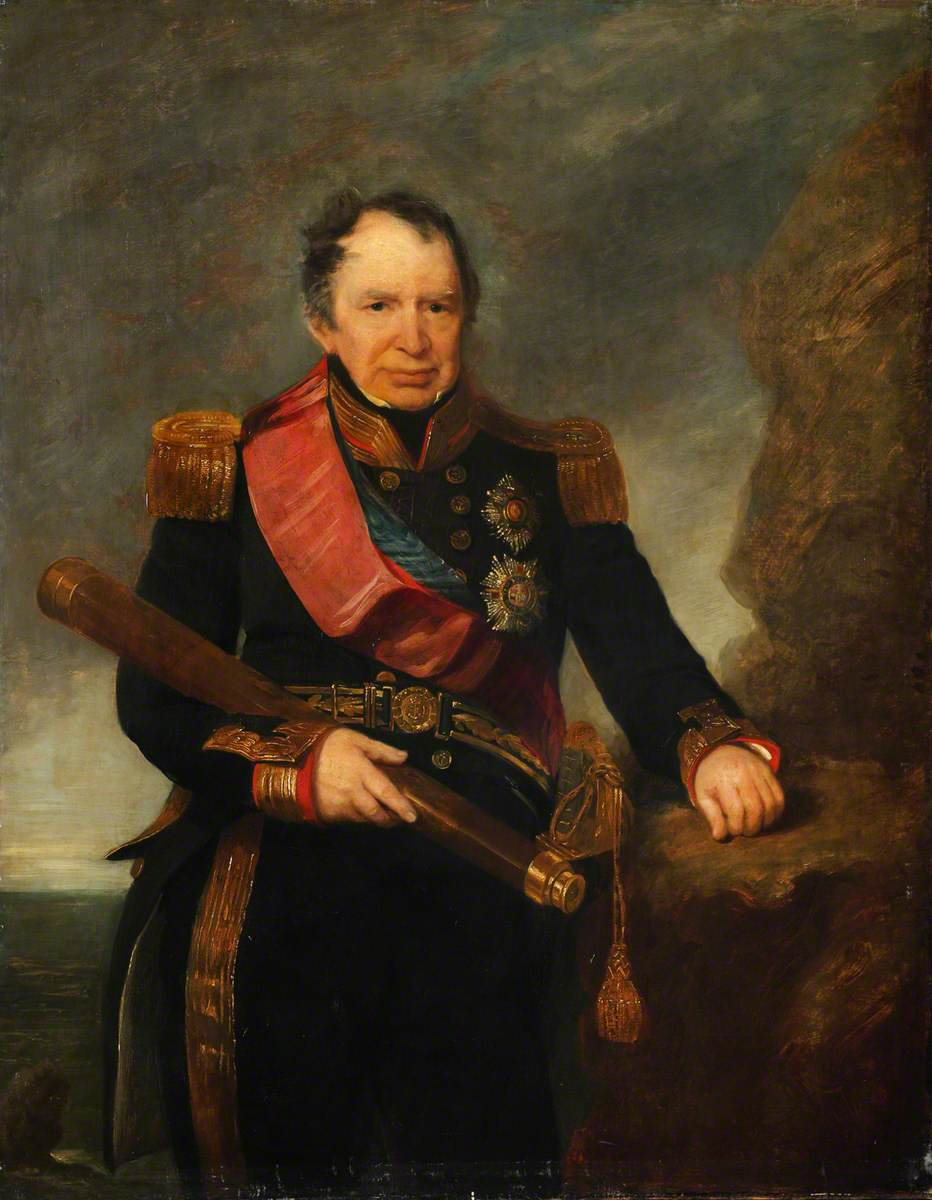
1832 portrait of Rowley

In 1808, both the Royal Navy and the French Imperial Navy despatched frigate squadrons to the Indian Ocean. The French, led by Commodore Jacques Hamelin, were ordered to disrupt British trade in the region, particularly targeting the large East Indiamen that carried millions of pounds worth of goods between Britain and her Empire. The British force under Commodore Josias Rowley was tasked with the blockade and eventual capture of the two well defended island bases of the French, Isle Bonaparte and Isle de France. At the action of 31 May 1809, a French frigate named Caroline captured two East Indiamen, sheltering with her prizes at Saint Paul on Isle Bonaparte. In his first major operation against the islands, Rowley landed soldiers behind the defences of the harbour and sent his ships into the bay, seizing the town and the shipping in the harbour, including Caroline. One of Rowley's captains who had performed well in this engagement was Robert Corbet of HMS Nereide. Refitting the Caroline as a British warship and renaming her HMS Bourbonaise, Rowley placed Corbet in command and sent him to Britain with despatches.

Over the following year, the French continued to attack British trade convoys, achieving important victories at the action of 18 November 1809 and the action of 3 July 1810, where they captured another five East Indiamen as well as numerous smaller merchant ships and a large Portuguese frigate. Rowley too was active, commanding the successful invasion of Isle Bonaparte in July and renaming the island Isle Bourbon, basing his squadron at Saint Paul on the island's eastern shore. From this base, Rowley's ships were ideally positioned to begin a close blockade of Isle de France, led initially by Captain Samuel Pym in HMS Sirius. Pym sought to reduce French movement by seizing a number of fortified offshore islands, starting with Île de la Passe off Grand Port. The island was captured, but when a French squadron broke through the British blockade and took shelter in Grand Port, Pym resolved to attack them. The ensuing Battle of Grand Port was a disaster for Rowley's squadron, as Pym led four of Rowley's five frigates into the bay without adequately assessing the channel through the coral reefs that sheltered the harbour. As a result, two frigates grounded out of range of the enemy and the remaining two were outnumbered in confined waters. In a complicated battle lasting several days, two of Pym's frigates were captured and two more had to be scuttled, with their entire crews made prisoner. Rowley's reinforcements arrived too late, and the British commodore was chased back to Saint Denis by Hamelin's flagship.

While Rowley and Hamelin had sparred in the Indian Ocean, Corbet had made the lengthy journey back to Britain. During his time in command of Nereide, Corbet had already developed a reputation as a strict disciplinarian, regularly beating his men for the slightest infractions, to the extent that he had provoked a brief mutiny on Nereide in 1808. His reputation spread before him, and when he switched commands with Captain Richard Raggett of HMS Africaine , he was met with a storm of protest from Africaine's crew. Although none of the men aboard Africaine had served with Corbet before, his preference for brutal punishment was well known in the Navy and the crew sent a letter to the Admiralty insisting that they would not serve under him. Concerned at what they considered to be mutiny, the Admiralty sent three popular officers to Africaine with the message that if the protest was quietly dropped there would be no courts-martial for mutiny but if not, the entire crew would be liable to attack. To emphasise the threat, the frigate HMS Menelaus was brought alongside, with her gunports open and her cannon ready to fire. Chastened, the crew of Africaine allowed Corbet aboard and the frigate sailed for the Indian Ocean a few days later, carrying instructions for the authorities at Madras to prepare an expeditionary force to invade Isle de France.

== Africaine off Isle de France ==
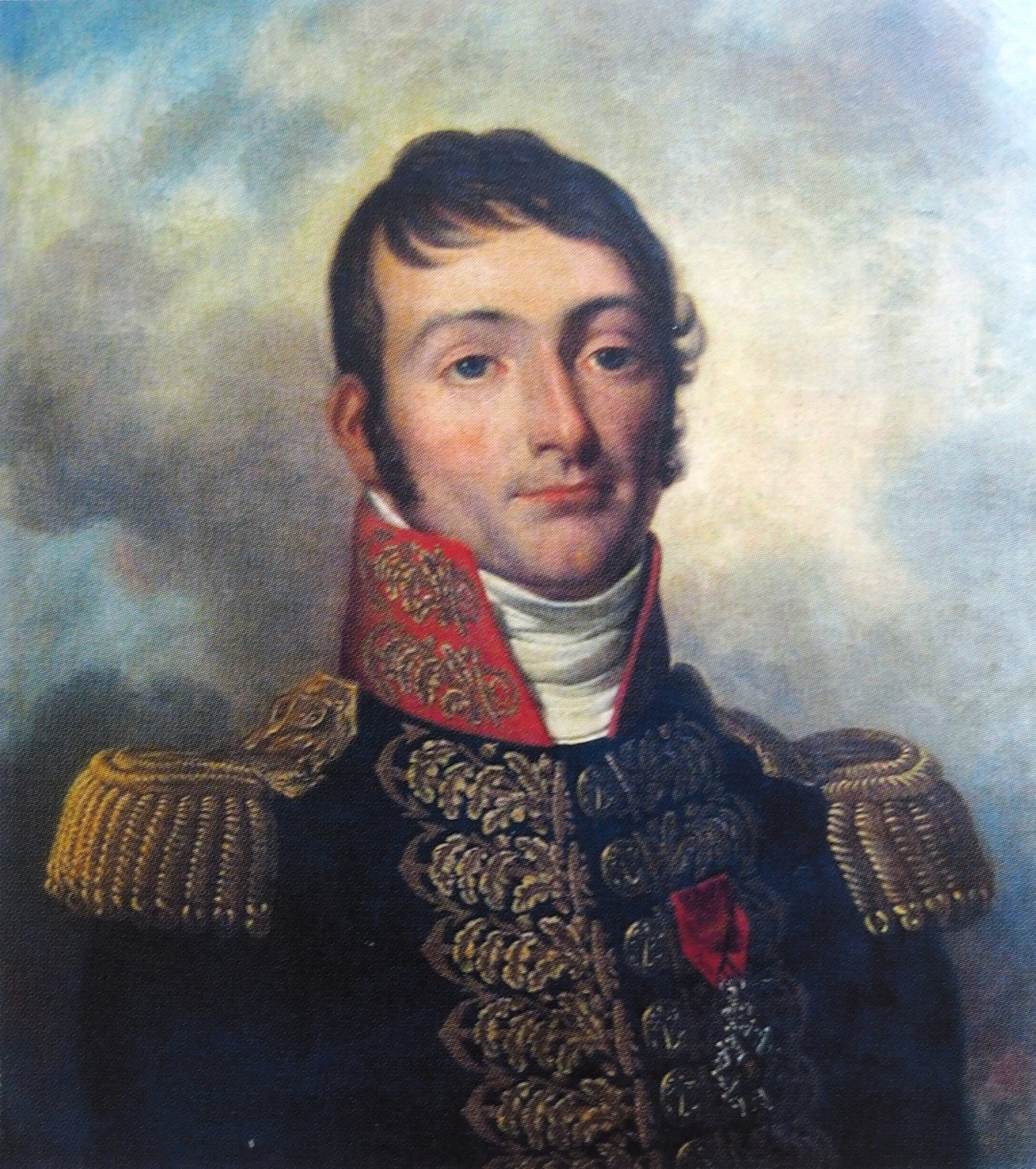
1832 portrait of Bouvet

Africaine's journey to Madras took several months and Corbet made a number of stops on his passage, the final one being at the small British island base of Rodriguez in early September 1810. There Corbet was informed of the disaster at Grand Port and on his own initiative immediately sailed south to augment Rowley's weakened squadron. Arriving off Isle de France at 06:15 on 11 September, Corbet spotted a French schooner near Île Ronde and gave chase, the schooner sheltering behind the reefs at Grand Bay on the eastern side of the island. At 07:30, Corbet ordered the frigate's boats to enter the creek into which the schooner had fled, the small craft entering the waterway in the hope of storming and capturing the vessel. As the boats approached, French soldiers and militia appeared along the banks and began firing on the British sailors. Fire was returned by Royal Marines in the boats, but Africaine's barge grounded soon after the ambush was sprung and became trapped, French gunfire killing two men and wounding ten. The other boat reached the grounded and abandoned schooner, but the six men aboard were unable to move the vessel unaided and were forced to depart, coming under fire which wounded five men, before they could escape the French trap.

Retrieving his boats, Corbet determined to sail to Isle Bourbon directly. By 04:00 on 12 September he had arrived at Saint-Denis and there landed his wounded and came ashore for news, learning that two French frigates were just offshore, blockading the port. The French ships had spotted Africaine in the harbour and despatched the small brig Entreprenant to Isle de France with information of her whereabouts, although Corbet had raised flags that successfully deceived the French into believing that his frigate was Rowley's flagship HMS Boadicea. The French ships were Astrée, commanded by Pierre François Étienne Bouvet de Maisonneuve, and Iphigénie, formerly one of the British frigates captured at Grand Port, under René Lemarant de Kerdaniel.

=== Battle ===
Rowley, stationed at Saint-Paul to the west of Saint-Denis, received word that Africaine had arrived at Saint Denis and immediately sought to drive off the French blockade. Sailing eastwards, Boadicea came within sight of Bouvet's squadron at 15:00 and the British flagship followed by the small brigs HMS Otter and HMS Staunch. Corbet recognised Rowley's intention and joined the attack, embarking 25 soldiers from the 86th Regiment of Foot to replace his losses at Grand Bay. The French, still believing Africaine to be Boadicea, assumed that Boadicea was an East Indiaman named Windham in disguise, and fell back towards Isle de France before the British force.

Otter and Staunch both fell rapidly behind Boadicea, while Africaine pulled far ahead. By 18:20, lookouts on Africaine could no longer see the other British ships, and by 18:30, Boadicea was similarly alone. Bouvet realised the lack of cohesion in the British squadron, and also recognised that Africaine was faster than either of his ships and would soon catch them. As a result, he slowed and prepared to meet the British frigate as night fell. Corbet now found himself outnumbered and began to launch rockets and flares in the hope of attracting Rowley's attention and as the French closed with Africaine, he readied his ship for action. 6 nautical miles (11 km) behind, Rowley could see the flares and flashes but was powerless to intercede in the darkness. At 01:50 on 13 September, the gap had closed between Africaine and the French ships, and at 02:20 Corbet opened fire on Astrée, with Bouvet returning the fire immediately.

A cannonball from the second French broadside struck Corbet within minutes of the first broadside, the ball tearing off his foot above the ankle just as a large wooden splinter thrown from the gunwale struck the thigh of the same leg, shattering the bone. Corbet was brought below to the ship's surgeon where the remnant of his leg was hastily amputated and bound, and command devolved on Lieutenant John Crew Tullidge. At 02:30, Astrée pulled away from Africaine to perform hasty repairs, but Bouvet's guns had wrecked Africaine's rigging, leaving the British frigate uncontrollable and largely immobile. Slowly moving ahead, Africaine engaged Iphigénie at close range but was counter attacked by Astrée and found herself assailed on both sides, Astrée angled in such a position that she was able to rake the British ship, inflicting significant damage and casualties.

By 03:30, Africaine was in ruins. Tullidge was wounded in four places, but refused to leave the deck as the ship's master had been decapitated and the other lieutenant shot in the chest. All three topmasts had collapsed and as guns were dismounted and casualties increased the return fire of Africaine became more and more ragged, until it stopped entirely at 04:45, when only two guns were still capable of firing. French fire stopped at 05:15, first light showing Boadicea 5 nautical miles (9.3 km) away and unable to affect the surrender of Africaine, which had hauled down its flags at 05:00. Within minutes, a French prize crew boarded the battered frigate and seized the magazine of shot and gunpowder, which was shipped to Iphigénie whose ammunition was almost exhausted.

=== Boadicea arrives ===
At 06:00, a breeze pushed Boadicea forward and she began to close with her former consort, Rowley watching as all three of Africaine's masts gave way and collapsed over the side one by one. By 08:00, Africaine was a dismasted hull and Corbet was dead in the bowels of the ship, although the exact manner of his death was to cause lasting controversy. By 10:00, Boadicea had been joined by Otter and Staunch and bore down on the French ships and their prize, so that by 15:30 Bouvet was persuaded to abandon Africaine and tow the damaged Iphigénie back to Port Napoleon. By 17:00, Boadicea pulled alongside Africaine and the French prize crew surrendered. Rowley later reported that a number of British sailors leaped into the sea at his approach and swam to Boadicea, requesting that they be allowed to pursue the French ships in the hope of capturing one.

Rowley dismissed this idea given the shattered state of Africaine and instead towed the frigate back to Isle Bourbon, shadowed by Astrée and Iphigénie on the return journey. The French frigates did achieve some consolation in pursuing Rowley from a distance, running into and capturing the Bombay Marine sloop-of-war HCS Aurora, which had been sent from India to reinforce Rowley. On 15 September, Boadicea, Africaine and the brigs arrived at Saint Paul, Africaine sheltering under the fortifications of the harbour while the others put to sea, again seeking to drive away the French blockade but unable to bring them to action. Bouvet returned to Port Napoleon on 18 September, and thus was not present when Rowley attacked and captured the French flagship Vénus and Commodore Hamelin at the action of 18 September 1810.

== Aftermath ==
The action was the first of two in this campaign in which lone British frigates were briefly overwhelmed by superior French forces as they sailed independently to join Rowley's squadron. On each occasion however, Rowley was able to recapture the lost frigate and drive off the French attackers. Corbet's action was particularly violent, British casualties totalling 49 killed and 114 wounded, including every single officer and all but three of the soldiers embarked. Africaine was seriously damaged and would not be ready to return to active service for some months. French losses were less severe, Astrée suffering one killed and two wounded, Iphigénie nine killed and 33 wounded.

The action was considered a defeat by the Admiralty and was not reported in the London Gazette. The British naval authorities were particularly disturbed by rumours that began to circulate concerning the death of Captain Corbet and the behaviour of his crew during the battle. Prominent among these rumours was the suggestion that Corbet had been murdered by his disaffected crew: historian William James wrote in 1827 that "There are many who will insist, that Captain Corbett's [sic] death-wound was inflicted by one of his own people." although he goes on to point out the unlikelihood of Corbet being shot by one of his own cannon. He gives more credence to the story that Corbet committed suicide to avoid the shame of defeat, that he "cut the bandages from his amputated limb, and suffered himself to bleed to death." This story was also alluded to in Edward Pelham Brenton's 1825 history: "Corbet did not (we fear would not) survive his capture". The truth of Corbet's end will never be known with certainty, although James ultimately concludes that Corbet's wound was almost certainly a mortal one and thus the most likely cause of death.

A second accusation, and one that proved even more controversial in the aftermath of the engagement, was the claim that Africaine's crew abandoned their guns, refused to load them or deliberately fired them into the sea in protest at Corbet's behaviour. Corbet's brutality was well known in the Navy, James describing him as "an excessively severe officer" who had a "career of cruelty". James does not accuse the crew of any deliberate attempt to sabotage their ship in the engagement, instead attributing their poor gunnery to Corbet's own failings as a commander, most significantly his failure to practice gunnery regularly. Other authors were less understanding of the crew of Africaine, Brenton stating that "they cut the breechings of their guns, and put no shot in them after the first or second broadside", while historian Basil Hall baldly stated in 1833 that they "preferred to be mown down by the French broadsides" than fight under Corbet. This last accusation provoked outrage among naval officers, and Captain Jenkin Jones, a former shipmate of Corbet launched a successful lawsuit, forcing Hall to make a retraction. In 1900, William Laird Clowes commented that "There is, unfortunately, much reason to suppose that Captain Corbett's [sic] reputation for extreme severity had antagonised his crew, and that the men did not behave as loyally as they should have behaved". He later castigates Brenton for the suggestion that Corbet committed suicide, suggesting that the wound alone was the cause of death. Modern historians have also been scathing of Corbet's behaviour, Robert Gardiner calling him "notoriously brutal," and Richard Woodman describing Tullidge as "an unfortunate victim of Corbet's cruelty, for suspicions lingered that Africaine's brutalised crew had failed to do their utmost in support of their hated commander."
