= Henry Sheehy Keating =

British Army officer (1775-1847)

Lieutenant-General Sir Henry Sheehy Keating KCB
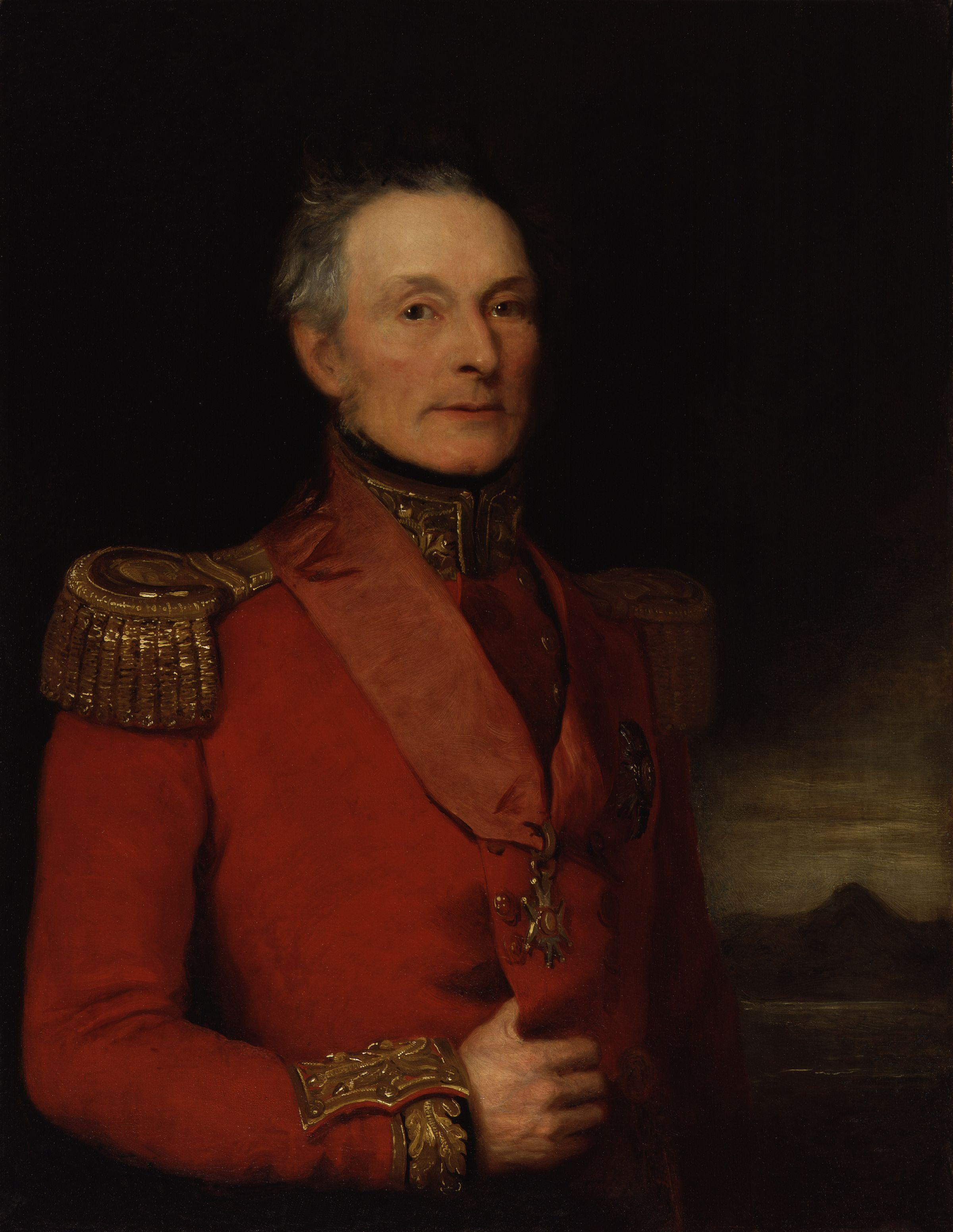
- Portrait by Andrew Morton, c. 1839
- Born: 13 November 1775; Bansha, County Tipperary
- Died: 12 September 1847 (aged 71); Cheltenham, Gloucestershire
- Spouse: Mary Anne Singer
- Relatives: Henry Singer Keating (son)
- Military career
- Allegiance: United Kingdom
- Branch: British Army
- Service years: 1793–1815
- Rank: Lieutenant-General
- Units: 33rd Regiment of Foot; 56th Regiment of Foot
- Conflicts: French Revolutionary Wars; Battle of Martinique (WIA) (POW); Napoleonic Wars; Raid on Saint Paul; Invasion of Île Bonaparte; Invasion of Île de France

Lieutenant-General Sir Henry Sheehy Keating, KCB (13 November 1775 – 12 September 1847) was a British Army officer who served in the French Revolutionary and Napoleonic Wars. He served in the Mauritius campaign of 1809–1811, when Keating commanded the troops stationed on Rodrigues, a small island used as a base by British forces during the campaign. Keating was instrumental in planning and executing a series of amphibious operations against French colonies in the Indian Ocean, culminating in the capture of both Isle Bonaparte and Isle de France in 1810.

== Early service ==
Keating joined the British Army in 1793, at the outbreak of the French Revolutionary Wars. Purchasing a commission in the 33rd Regiment of Foot, Keating was almost immediately despatched to the West Indies with his regiment. Serving the campaign against French colonies in the region under Sir Charles Grey, Keating was promoted to lieutenant and fought in the invasion of Martinique, during which he was twice grievously wounded and taken prisoner by the French. While recovering from his wounds, which included a broken arm from a musket shot and a skull fracture from a shell splinter, Keating was held in a prison hulk for 18 months, before being sent to a more secure prison facility in La Rochelle.

On his return to Britain in 1796, Keating was promoted to captain. In 1800 he purchased a promotion to major and was transferred to the 56th Regiment of Foot, then stationed in Ireland. Serving as a brigade major, Keating was placed in command of recruitment in County Mayo, a service for which he later received the thanks of both his senior officers and the local government. Serving through the Peace of Amiens, Keating became lieutenant colonel in command of the 56th on 1 August 1804.

== Eastern service ==
In 1807, Keating was sent for service in British India and in 1809 was detailed to command the land forces in a combined operation against the French held islands of Île Bonaparte and Île de France. These colonies formed a base for a powerful squadron of French frigates, which were at the time causing severe damage to British trade in the region, breaking up East Indiamen convoys and seizing ships with cargoes worth over £500,000. Keating, with a detachment of soldiers provided by the Madras government and using ships from the squadron of Commodore Josias Rowley, who was in overall command, seized the small island of Rodrigues. This provided an adequate base for British ships to operate from and for amphibious operations against the other islands to be staged.

Keating's first duty came in September 1809, when he was ordered to storm the port of Saint Paul on Île Bonaparte. This harbour was sheltering a French frigate named Caroline and two captured East Indiamen, but was defended by five powerful gun batteries. Keating and Rowley agreed that a frontal assault would fail, and instead devised a plan in which Keating, with 368 of his own men and 236 sailors and Royal Marines under Royal Navy Captain Nesbit Willoughby would land at Point de Galet, 7 miles (11 km) from Saint Paul. The force would then advance and storm the batteries from the rear. The plan was a total success, Keating's men capturing each battery in turn early in the morning of 21 September and using the cannon within to fire on the shipping in the harbour. A brief attempt at defence by local forces was brushed aside, and Keating and his men re-embarked in the evening, the force remaining offshore until 28 September.

Keating also masterminded the invasion and capture of Île Bonaparte and Île de France, being seriously wounded in the latter when he was stabbed in the thigh during a skirmish. For his service in the campaign, Keating was awarded 400 guineas worth of silver plate and given the governorship of the renamed Île Bonaparte, Ile Bourbon. In 1815, at the end of the war, Keating arranged for the island's return to representatives of the restored French king, Louis XVIII.

== Family and later career ==
Keating married Mary Anne Singer in Dublin. Their eldest son, Henry Singer Keating born in 1804, became a prominent lawyer and MP, serving twice as Solicitor General.

In 1815, Henry Keating was made a Companion of the Order of the Bath. He had continued to rise in rank, becoming a major general in 1813 and reaching lieutenant general in 1837. The year before he had been knighted, becoming a Knight Commander of the Order of the Bath. In April 1845, he was made honorary colonel of the 33rd Regiment of Foot.

He died in September 1847 in Cheltenham aged 71. His remains are interred in the town's cemetery and a Memorial to him was erected in Christ Church, Cheltenham.

== Portrayal in fiction ==
Keating is a secondary character in the novel The Mauritius Command by Patrick O'Brian, which portrays the Mauritius campaign of 1809–1811. He is favourably portrayed as a capable and decisive commander.

Political offices
Preceded by French governor Jean-Chrysostôme de Sainte-Suzanne	Governor of Île Bourbon; 1810–1811	Succeeded by Robert Townsend Farquhar
Preceded by Robert Townsend Farquhar	Governor of Île Bourbon; 1811–1815	Succeeded by French governor Athanase Bouvet de Lozier
Military offices
Preceded by Sir Charles Wale	Colonel of the 33rd (Duke of Wellington's) Regiment of Foot; 1845–1847	Succeeded by Henry D'Oyly
Preceded by Isaac Gascoyne	Colonel of the 54th (West Norfolk) Regiment of Foot; 1841–1845	Succeeded by The Lord Downes
Preceded by Sir Ralph Darling	Colonel of the 90th Regiment of Foot; 1837–1841	Succeeded by Sir Alexander Leith
