= Robert Corbet (disambiguation) =

Robert Corbet (died 1810) was a British Royal Navy officer killed in action in highly controversial circumstances.

Robert Corbet may also refer to:

- Robert Corbet (MP for Worcestershire), MP for Worcestershire 1341
- Robert Corbet (died 1417), MP for Wiltshire 1385,1397, Hertfordshire 1402, 1404 and Suffolk 1414
- Robert Corbet (died 1420) (1383–1420), MP for Shropshire 1413, 1419
- Robert Corbet (died 1583) (1542–1583), MP for Shropshire 1563
- Robert Corbet (died 1676), Parliamentarian politician of the English Civil War and MP for Shropshire in the First Protectorate Parliament of 1654
- Sir Robert Corbet, 4th Baronet (c. 1670–1740), MP for Shropshire, 1705–10 and 1715–22
- Robert Corbet, author of young adult fiction titles such as Shelf Life

== See also ==
- Robert Corbett (disambiguation)
- Corbet (surname)
