= HMS Otter (1805) =

Sloop of the Royal Navy

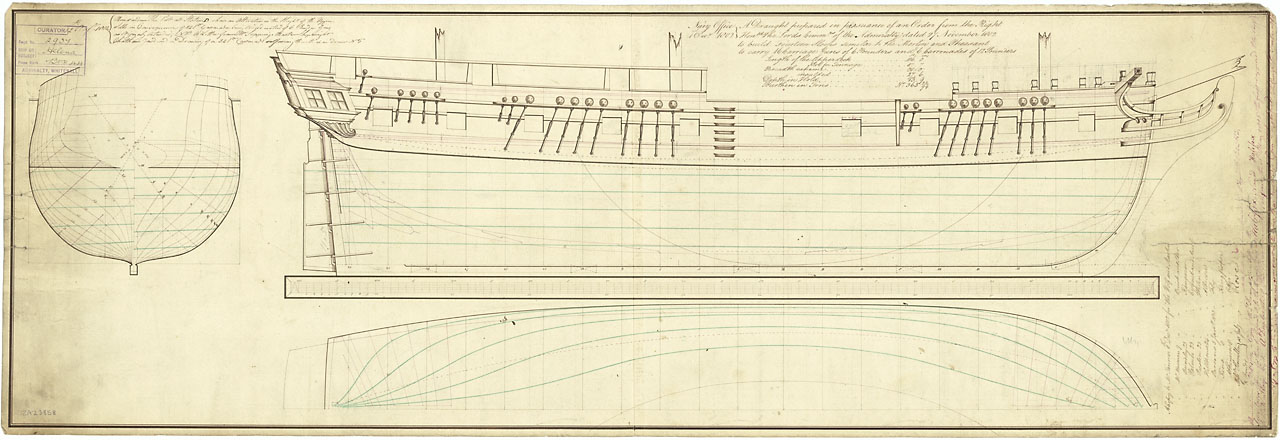
- Otter

History

United Kingdom
- Name: HMS Otter
- Namesake: Lutra lutra, the otter
- Ordered: 27 November 1802
- Builder: Peter Atkinson of Hull
- Laid down: July 1803
- Launched: 2 March 1805
- Commissioned: 19 May 1805 at Sheerness
- Honours and awards: Naval General Service Medal with clasp "Otter 18 Sept. 1810"
- Fate: Hulked at Pembroke in 1814; Sold 6 March 1828

General characteristics
- Class & type: Merlin-class ship sloop
- Tons burthen: 36532/94 (bm)
- Length: 106 ft (32.3 m) (gundeck); 87 ft 7 in (26.7 m) (keel)
- Beam: 28 ft (8.5 m)
- Depth of hold: 13 ft 9 in (4.19 m)
- Sail plan: Full-rigged ship
- Complement: 121
- Armament: 16 × 32-pounder carronades + 2 × 6-pounder guns

HMS Otter was a Royal Navy 16-gun Merlin-class sloop, launched in 1805 at Hull. She participated in two notable actions in the Indian Ocean and was sold in 1828.

== Armament ==
When built, Otter mounted sixteen 32-pounder carronades and two 6-pounder long guns. Under the rating system of the time, she was officially rated at "16 guns". From 1815 she was re-rated to "18 guns", but continued to carry the same armament.

== Service ==
Otter entered service in 1805 under Commander John Davies and was attached to the Channel Fleet. On 31 January 1807 Otter recaptured Enterprize. Twenty days later, Otter was in company with Kangaroo and Clyde and so shared in the salvage money for the recapture of Farely. Otter sailed for the Cape of Good Hope on 18 August 1807. From there she sailed to Montevideo to support the British attack on the Spanish colony. When he arrived Davies discovered that the British army had been defeated and surrendered. Davies then sailed to the Cape of Good Hope, where Commander Nesbit Willoughby took command of Otter. On 24 February 1808 Otter sent into the Cape of Good Hope Harregaard, a Danish vessel coming from Bengal.

On 15 July 1808 Nereide, Otter, and Charwell shared in the capture of the French brig Lucie, and her cargo of slaves. (Note: A first-class share of the bounty-money was worth £8 16s 6 1/2d; a sixth-class share was worth 3s 1d.) Some months later, on 7 November, Leopard and Otter captured some slaves, for which they received bounty-money from the East India Company.

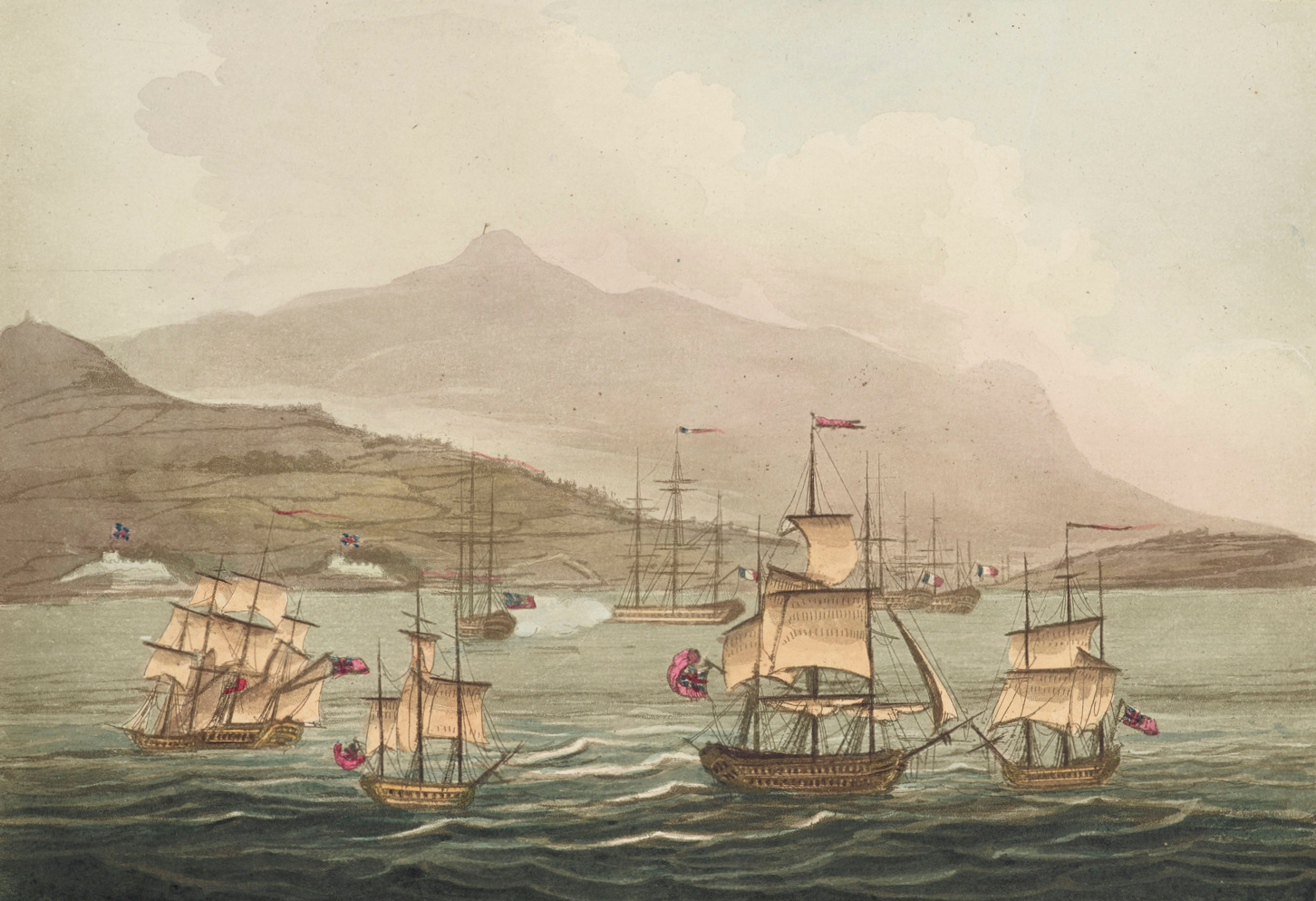
A view showing Otter raiding Saint-Paul on 21 September 1809. In the background, Sirius rakes Caroline.

Otter was then attached to the squadron under Commodore Josias Rowley that was ordered to blockade the French colonies of Île Bonaparte and Île de France in the Indian Ocean. Otter raided anchorages on the islands. For instance, on 14 August 1809 her boats were in action at Riviere Noire, Île de France. Between 20 and 24 September she took part in the Raid on Saint Paul. Willoughby led the naval landing party that captured the harbour, for which he was promoted. Otter suffered one man killed and one man wounded. After Willoughby's promotion, command initially passed to Lieutenant Edward Benge (acting). Command then passed to Commander James Tompkinson who remained in command throughout the campaign.

On 10 January 1810, Otter and Raisonable captured Charles. Then on 30 March Otter captured two vessels, Amazon and Gagne Petit. On 22 August Otter, Boadicea and Staunch shared in the capture of Garronne. (Note: A first-class share, such as a captain would receive, was worth £602 3s 4d; a sixth-class share, that of an ordinary seaman, was worth £6 13s 0 3/4d.) On 4 September the same three vessels shared in the capture of the Ranger. (Note: The prize money for a first-class share was £55 14s 11d; an ordinary seaman received 10s 7 1/2d.)

More importantly, Otter operated in a supporting role in the action of 13 September 1810 and the action of 18 September 1810, providing towlines to the battered British frigates Africaine and Ceylon. Tompkinson was promoted into Ceylon and command passed to Lieutenant Bertie Cator. He then moved to command the transport Anna during the Invasion of Île de France in December 1810. Lieutenant Thomas Lamb Polden Laugharne (acting), immediately replaced Cator and then sailed Otter back to Britain with despatches of the campaign. (Note: Commander Edward Stopford was appointed to command Otter but he remained in the East Indies, to which she never returned.)

Nearly four decades later her service in the battle was among the actions recognised by the clasp "Otter 18 Sept. 1810" to the Naval General Service Medal, awarded upon application to all British participants still living in 1847.

== Fate ==
Otter was fitted for ordinary at Plymouth in April 1811. She remained in ordinary at Plymouth through 1812 to 1813 and was then fitted for quarantine service as a lazaretto for Pembroke between February and April 1814. The "Principal Officers and Commissioners of His Majesty's Navy" offered the "Otter sloop, of 365 tons", lying at Pembroke, for sale on 28 March 1828. She was sold to J. Holmes for £610.
