= Raid on Saint-Paul =

1809 battle of the Mauritius campaign of 1809–1811

- Part of the Mauritius campaign of 1809–1811
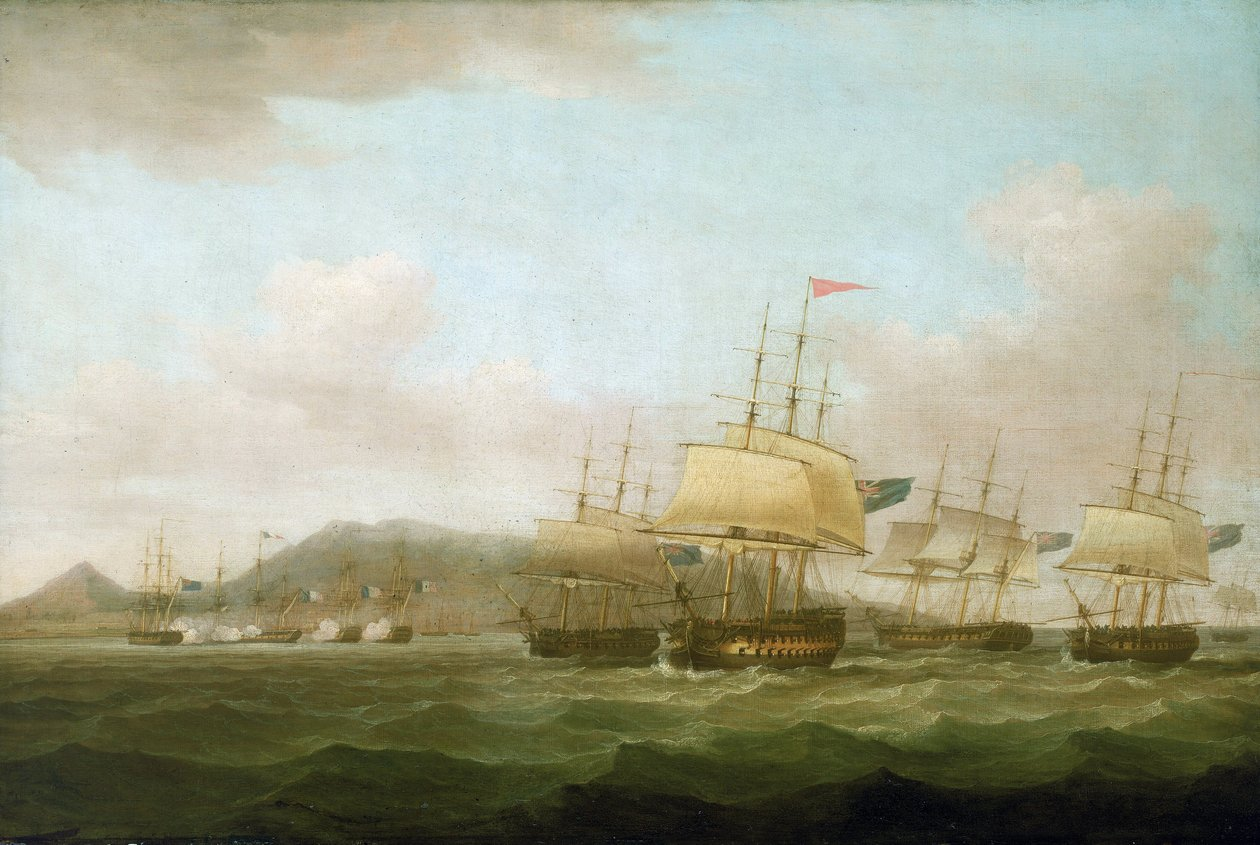
- The capture of Saint Paul near the Isle de Bourbon, 21 September 1809; Thomas Whitcombe, 1812
Date	21 September 1809
Location	Saint-Paul, Isle Bonaparte 21°0′S 55°16′E
Result	British victory

Belligerents
United Kingdom; East India Company	France

Commanders and leaders
Josias Rowley; Henry Sheehy Keating	Nicolas des Bruslys †

Strength
604; 1 ship of the line 3 frigates 1 sloop-of-war 1 schooner	1 frigate 1 brig 7-8 merchant ships 5 gun batteries

Casualties and losses
15 killed 58 wounded 3 missing	1 frigate captured 1 brig captured 7-8 merchant ships captured

The raid on Saint-Paul was an amphibious operation conducted by British forces against the port of Saint-Paul in the French colony of Isle Bonaparte during the Napoleonic Wars. It was launched on 20 September 1809 as both a precursor to a future full-scale invasion of Isle Bonaparte and in order to capture the French frigate Caroline and the East Indiamen she had seized in the action of 31 May 1809 which were sheltering in the harbour. The operation was a complete success, with British storming parties capturing the batteries overlooking the port, which allowed a naval squadron under Commodore Josias Rowley to enter the bay and capture the shipping in the harbour.

The French defenders of the town, despite initially resisting the attack, were unable to prevent the seizure of the port's defensive fortifications. The British force later withdrew under pressure from the main garrison of the island, burning warehouses containing over £500,000 worth of silk captured from British merchant ships. Ultimately the French were unable to effectively oppose the invasion, the island's governor General Nicolas Ernault des Bruslys retreating to Saint-Denis rather than engage the British and later committing suicide. The transportation of forces from the recently captured island of Rodriguez, the co-ordination of land and naval forces and the failure of the French defenders to co-ordinate an effective response were all features of the subsequent invasion and capture of Isle Bonaparte in July 1810.

== Background ==
The French Indian Ocean colonies of Isle de France and Isle Bonaparte were heavily fortified island bases from which French frigates were able to launch raids against British trade routes across the Indian Ocean during the Napoleonic Wars. In late 1808, a squadron of four frigates departed France for the region under Commodore Jacques Hamelin with orders to prey on the convoys of East Indiamen that regularly crossed the Indian Ocean. During the late spring of 1809, these frigates dispersed into the Bay of Bengal, attacking British shipping and coastal harbours around the rim of the Eastern Indian Ocean. The Royal Navy was also preparing an operation in the region, a staggered campaign intended to blockade, isolate and subsequently capture both Isle de France and Isle Bonaparte, eliminating the final French territories and bases east of Africa.

To conduct the British operation, Admiral Albemarle Bertie at the Cape of Good Hope organised a squadron under Commodore Josias Rowley to blockade the islands, capture any French shipping that presented itself and begin preparations for the invasions. Rowley was equipped with the antiquated ship of the line HMS Raisonnable and a small squadron of frigates and smaller ships, later reinforced with a force of soldiers from Madras in British India, with which he seized the nearby island of Rodriguez to use as a raiding base.

On 14 August, one of Rowley's ships, the 18-gun sloop HMS Otter, attacked a French brig at Rivière Noire District in Isle de France. Although the attack was ultimately unsuccessful, Otter's captain Nesbit Willoughby and his landing party were able to break into and out of the harbour without severe difficulties. This prompted Rowley to consider a larger scale operation against a more heavily fortified French position. Two months earlier, in the action of 31 May 1809, the French frigate Caroline had captured two East Indiamen, Streatham and Europe, in the Bay of Bengal. The French captain, Jean-Baptiste-Henri Feretier, led his prizes back to the French-held islands, arriving off Isle de France on 22 July. Feretier was prevented from attempting to reach Port Louis by Rowley's blockading squadron and instead put his ships into Saint-Paul on Isle Bonaparte to unload his captured vessels and replenish his supplies.

== Raid ==
=== Preparation ===
Rowley became aware of Feretier's presence at Saint-Paul during the following month and determined to attack the port and recapture the valuable ships in the harbour. The operation was also to be a prelude to an eventual invasion attempt, giving the squadron experience of an amphibious landing operation. Conferring with Lieutenant Colonel Henry Keating on Rodriguez, Rowley determined that Keating's men would land behind the gun batteries that defended the town and storm them. This would allow Rowley to bring his squadron directly into the harbour, capture the shipping anchored there and possibly seize the town as well. Rowley's planning was directly affected by a failed attack on Saint-Paul on 11 November 1806, when HMS Sceptre and HMS Cornwallis had attacked the harbour without infantry support. Their target was the frigate Sémillante, but neither British ship had been able to pass the heavy batteries that protected the port and they were forced to withdraw.

On 16 September 1809, the troops were prepared, and 368 British Army soldiers were embarked on the British frigate HMS Nereide under Captain Robert Corbet, Willoughby's Otter and the Bombay Marine schooner HCS Wasp. This troop convoy was joined off Saint-Paul on 18 September by the rest of Rowley's squadron, the flagship Raisonnable and the frigates HMS Sirius under Captain Samuel Pym, and HMS Boadicea under Captain John Hatley. These ships mustered an additional 236 seaman volunteers and Royal Marines who would join the assault. The entire invasion force was then embarked on Nereide, as Corbet had experience with the Isle Bonaparte coastline, with the assault designated for the early morning of 21 September.

=== Assault ===
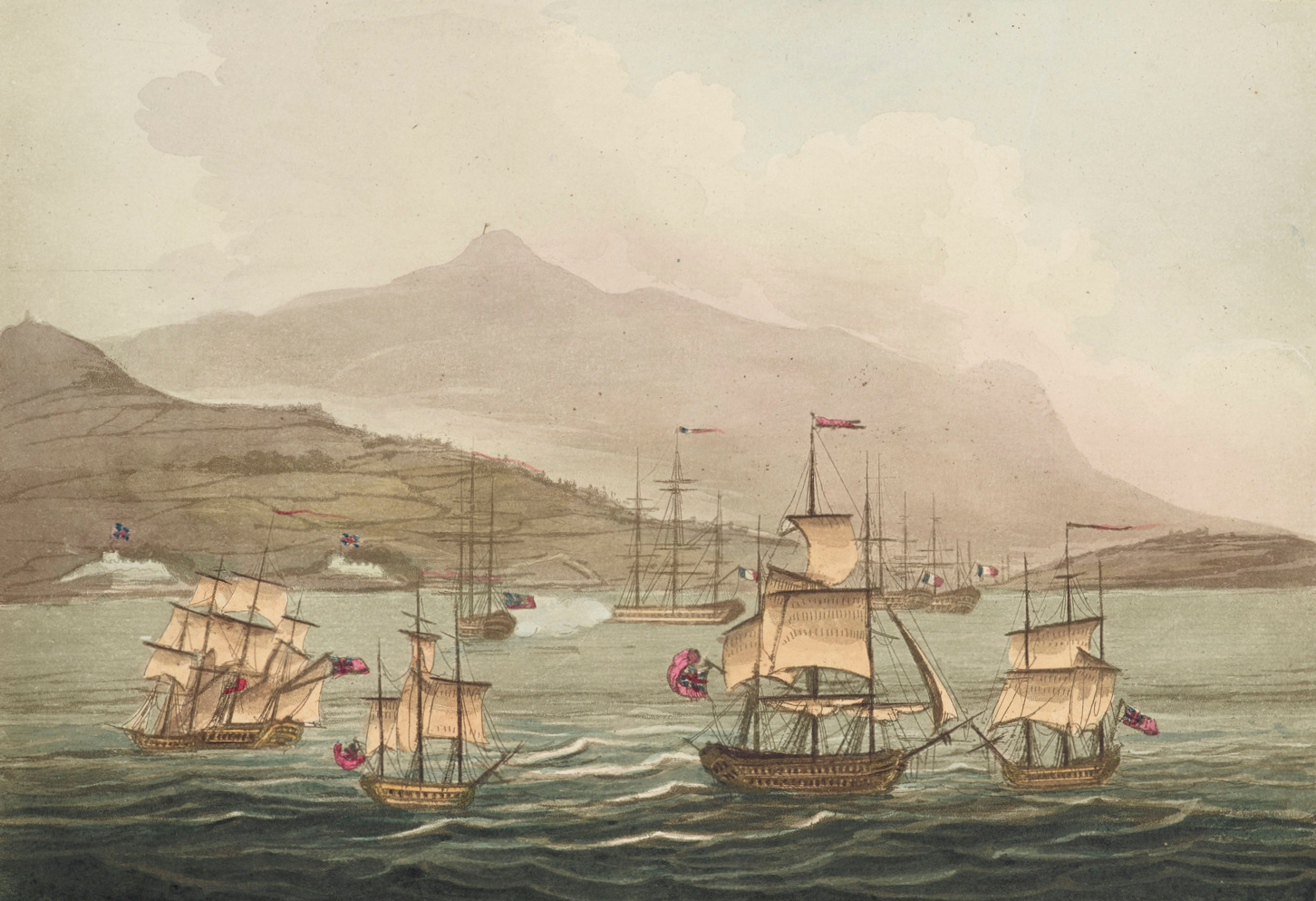
The attack on the 21st, showing HMS Sirius raking Caroline

At 05:00 on 21 September 1809, Nereide entered the bay of Saint-Paul under the cover of darkness and successfully landed the British force, without any sign they had been sighted from the shore, at the Pointe des Galets. The Pointe des Galets was 7 miles (11 km) north of Saint-Paul, the distance allowing the force, divided into Keating's soldiers from Rodriguez and the naval force led by Nesbit Willoughby, to approach the heavy gun batteries that guarded the port unobserved. Storming the strongest batteries, Lambousière and la Centière, at 07:00, the British force surprised the garrisons, captured the fortifications and turned their cannon onto the shipping moored in the harbour, firing grape shot at the decks of the frigate Caroline.

A detachment of the British landing force then separated from the main body and seized a third battery named la Neuf, routing a force of local militia that attempted to block their advance with artillery assistance from the British squadron in the bay. The militia had come down from their garrisons in the surrounding hills and been joined by 110 French soldiers who had disembarked from Caroline, but the small French force was easily brushed aside by the British landing party. Keating and Willoughby then destroyed the guns in the first two captured batteries and stormed the remaining two fortifications, once again capturing them and using their own cannon to fire on the shipping in the harbour.

While the landing force drove off the defenders and captured the fortifications, the naval squadron entered the harbour and opened up an overwhelming fire on the outnumbered Caroline. Shot was also fired at the captured East Indiamen, various other vessels in the harbour and any small batteries or shore positions that remained in French hands. Feretier and the other French naval officers, recognising that their position was hopeless, cut the anchor cables of their ships and allowed them to drift ashore, where they abandoned ship to escape capture. The British squadron then anchored in the harbour as their crews set about refloating the grounded French ships on the beach. In addition to Caroline and the East Indiamen Streatham and Europe, Rowley's squadron captured the 14-gun privateer brig Grappler, which the French had captured in 1806 from the Bombay Marine, and five or six smaller merchantmen. With the harbour and fortifications in British hands, Keating and Willoughby entered the town of Saint-Paul without further combat.

=== Withdrawal ===
On the night of 21 September, the landing party embarked on the British ships in the bay having destroyed all of the fortified positions that surrounded the harbour. During 22 September, French forces were seen gathering in the hills around the town, brought from outlying garrisons to join the main garrison from the capital Saint-Denis by the island's governor-general, Nicolas Ernault des Bruslys. Rowley and Keating anticipated that this force, which outnumbered their own, would recapture the town on 23 September and accordingly ordered Willoughby to land with his marines and sailors to burn French government property along the waterfront. The most obvious and significant target of Willoughby's force was a warehouse on the docks that was stocked with the captured silk from the East Indiamen captured by Caroline. Willoughby ordered this building to be burned, destroying over £500,000 worth of captured textiles, (the equivalent of £35,000,000 as of 2025). Other nearby warehouses were not destroyed as it was not possible to rapidly determine their ownership. Although the French force had reached the outskirts of the town, Willoughby was able to land and reembark his troops without a single shot being fired.

On 22 September, Rowley received a petition from a body of slaves in the town who had escaped during the fighting and demanded arms with which to attack the French. They also offered to burn the town to the ground. Rowley, who sought to cultivate good relations with the powerful elements of society with a view to capturing the island in the near future, refused their demands and had the slaves returned to their owners, where eight were executed for plotting rebellion. There was however a noted example of a slave displaying loyalty to his owner: The painter Jean-Joseph Patu de Rosemont had served in the militia forces with the journalist Nicole Robinet de La Serve and was captured when Keating's troops entered Saint-Paul. Taken aboard the British squadron, Rosemont's son Amédée applied to exchange himself for his father as a prisoner but was refused. Shortly before the squadron departed, Rosemont's personal slave Félix swam to the squadron to serve his owner in captivity. For his loyalty, Félix was manumitted when Rosemont was freed in 1810.

On 23 September, Rowley and Keating planned another landing under cover of the guns of the Nereide to drive off the French reinforcements. On landing, however, it was discovered that the French force had disappeared. Lacking support for a counterattack from the local landowners, who were mostly royalists hostile to the current regime in France, des Bruslys was unwilling to order an assault which he deemed would have inevitably led to an unnecessary bloodbath. Instead, he ordered his forces to abandon Saint-Paul and retire to Saint-Denis during the night. Without support from his commanding officer, Captain St-Michel, commandant of Saint-Paul, agreed to surrender the town entirely, withdrawing his remaining forces under a flag of truce. The agreed truce lasted five days, during which the British force loaded their ships with French government provisions, equipment, military and naval stores and those cargoes from captured British ships that had not been burnt by Willoughby. The French made no effort to prevent this, des Bruslys having committed suicide some days before, torn between his refusal to surrender the island to the British and his reluctance to order a bloody battle for what he regarded to be an "open island".

Rowley also captured the East Indiamen Streatham and Europe and restored their previous captains and crews, who had been released as part of the truce. A number of smaller merchant ships were captured and all were refitted for the journey to Britain, to be convoyed there by the newly captured Caroline. This 40-gun frigate, only three years old and very large and powerfully built, was given to Corbet in recognition of his services in the operation and renamed HMS Bourbonaise, reflecting the British name for Isle Bonaparte, "Isle Bourbon". Willoughby was promoted to post captain and immediately took command of Corbet's former ship Nereide. Late on 28 September, Rowley led his force to sea from Saint-Paul having burnt or seized all government shipping, stores and buildings in the town and surrounding areas.

== Aftermath ==
Casualties of the operation were not high on either side. British losses in the landing party amounted to 15 killed and 58 wounded, with an additional three missing. The naval squadron suffered no known casualties in the engagement, principally because they did not come under heavy fire. French losses have not been calculated, but apart from des Bruslys were probably a similar figure to the British. In contrast, the damage to the morale of the French defenders of Isle Bonaparte was severe: the death of des Bruslys and the failure to properly defend the port undermined their efforts to such a degree that the eventual invasion of the island in 1810 was carried out without significant fighting. This invasion force was similar in size to the raiding party and was once again led by Rowley and Keating.

Caroline was a "tolerably fine frigate" and her capture was a blow to the French squadron based on Isle de France under Hamelin. The recapture of the East Indiamen was an important success, reducing the impact of French operations in the region during 1809. The raid also provided the British forces with vital experience in conducting amphibious landings staged from Rodriguez and gave an indication of the quality of French shore defences and defensive formations throughout the islands, which would have an important effect on future operations, especially the successful British invasion of Isle Bonaparte in 1810.

Lloyd's List (LL) reported on 9 January 1811 that the captured vessels, except for Europe, which had been sent to Bombay, had all arrived at the Cape of Good Hope.
