= Nicolas Ernault des Bruslys =

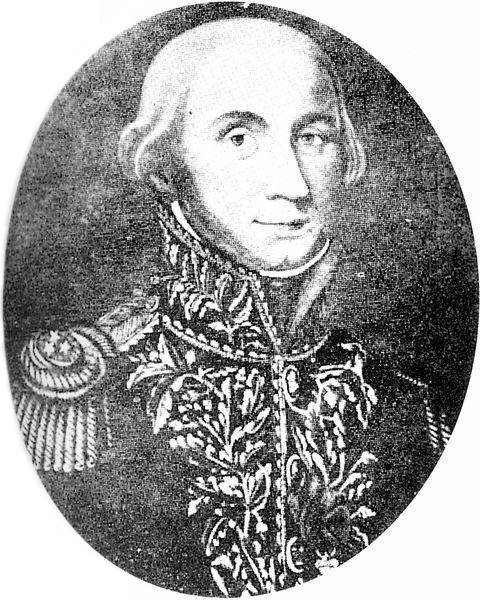
- Born: 7 August 1757; Brive-la-Gaillarde, France
- Died: 25 September 1809 (aged 52); Saint-Denis, Réunion
- Military career
- Allegiance: Kingdom of France; French First Republic; French First Empire
- Branch: French Royal Army; French Revolutionary Army; French Imperial Army
- Service years: 1774–1809
- Rank: Brigade general
- Conflicts: War of the First Coalition; Siege of Namur (1792); Siege of Maastricht (1793); War of the Second Coalition; Napoleonic Wars; Raid on Saint-Paul
- Awards: Legion of Honour

Brigade-General Nicolas Jean Ernault de Rignac des Bruslys (7 August 1757 – 25 September 1809) was a French Army officer and colonial administrator who served as the governor of Isle Bonaparte from 1806 to 1809.

== Biography ==
=== Early career ===
Des Bruslys joined the École des Mineurs in Verdun on September 28, 1774. After the school closed the following year, he joined an elite cavalry unit, the Gardes du Corps du Roi (bodyguards of the king). He received a commission of second lieutenant in the 3rd Artillery regiment in July 1780.

In 1781, des Bruslys took part in a failed attempt to invade British India. He was promoted to first lieutenant in September 1783 and to captain of the colonial troops on 7 May 1786. He took part in a diplomatic mission to Persia before returning to France in 1787.

From January 1788, he served as aide to the inspector of the artillery. In September, he was promoted to lieutenant-colonel. On September 14, 1792, he distinguished himself at La Croix-aux-Bois, reforming disbanded battalions and disbanding four battalions which were threatened with encirclement. On the following day, he saved the supplies of his army which were being attacked by three enemy squadrons.

On 8 October, he was promoted to Adjudant-général-colonel, and took part in the siege of Namur in late November, personally leading the capture of the fort of Vilatte. On 26 November he was wounded by shrapnel in the right arm.

=== French revolution ===
From 26 January 1793, he led the siege at Maastricht where he was wounded on 27 February 1794 by a cannonball in the right leg.

On 7 August 1794, des Bruslys was promoted to acting Général de brigade and served as de facto chief of staff of the armies of the North, Belgium and the Ardennes. His rank was confirmed on 13 May, but revoked on 10 August and he was arrested shortly thereafter following suspicions raised by the defection of his brothers in 1791. He was released during the Thermidorian Reaction, on 9 Thermidor Year II (27 July 1794). On 22 Thermidor (9 August), he was again arrested as the former head of staff of Adam Philippe, Comte de Custine. He was freed on 19 Frimaire an III (9 December 1794) and dispatched to the Army of the West.

Des Bruslys was soon called back to Paris, and defended the National Convention during the revolt of 1 Prairial Year III. On 26 Germinal (15 April 1795), he was sent to the Army of the North. From 25 Pluviôse an V (13 February 1797), he was in charge of defending the coast. On 28 Messidor an VI (16 July 1798), he was sent to the Army of England, which he quit to take back his previous position on 21 Nivôse an VII (10 January 1799). He was seconded to the Army of the Rhine on 26 Frimaire an VIII (17 December 1799), where he distinguished himself at Fribourg and Biberach an der Riß. He served under Jean Victor Marie Moreau at Ulm and defended St. Gotthard Pass.

In Vendémiaire an X (October 1801), he took command of the Souham division, before being put at the disposal of the Ministry of the Navy. On 25 Nivôse (15 January 1802), he was sent to Rochefort, embarked aboard the frigate Thêmis and sailed to Isle de France, under François-Louis Magallon. He married there. When Magallon was sent back to France, Decaen appointed des Bruslys governor of Réunion in 1806. On 4 Germinal an XII (25 March 1804), he received the Legion of Honour, and on 13 July 1808, he was promoted to Général de division.

=== First French Empire ===
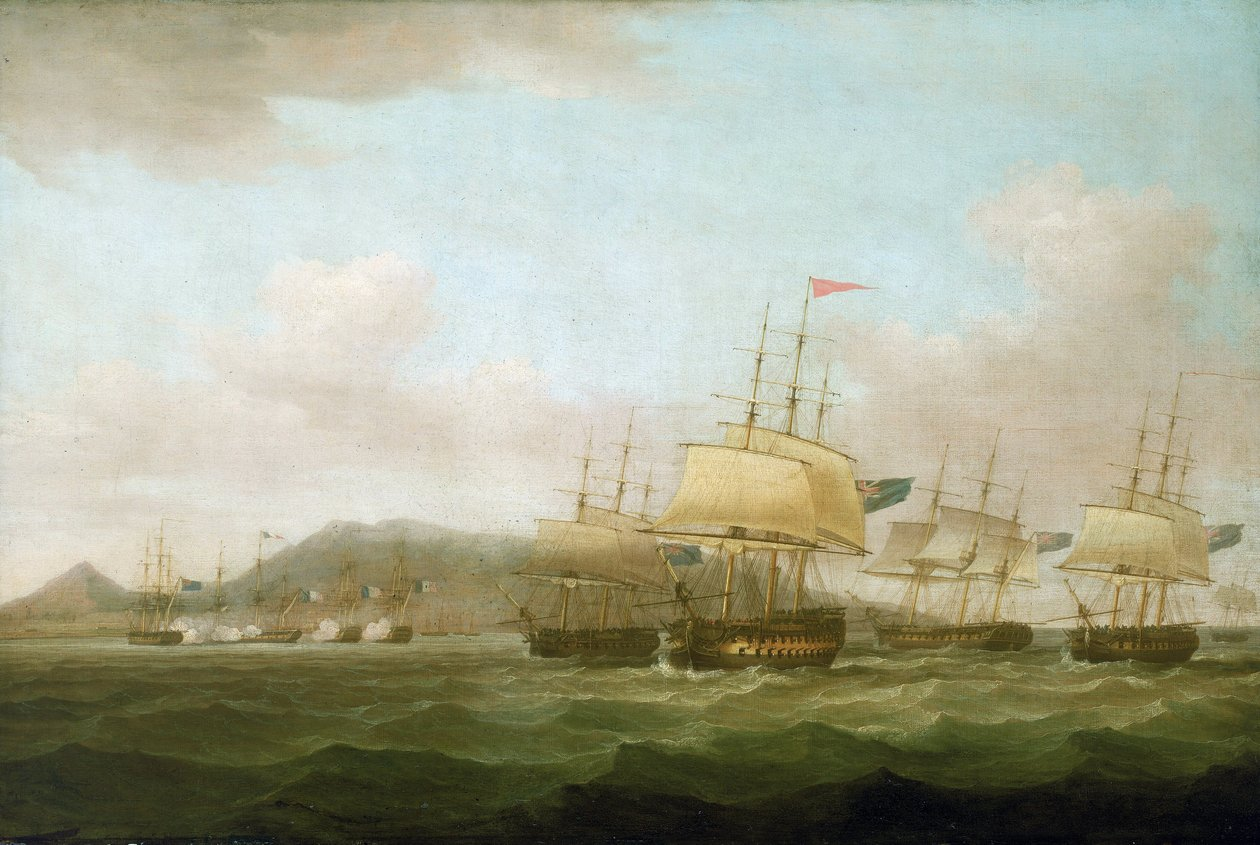
The British raid on Saint-Paul in 1809, which led to des Bruslys' suicide

Charles Mathieu Isidore Decaen had thought that the British would attempt a raid at Saint-Paul. Des Bruslys both did not share the conviction and was reluctant to weaken the defences of Saint-Denis, thinking that his forces did not allow him effectively to defend the entire coastline.

The British raided Saint Paul on 21 September 1809. Unable to hold their position, the French retreated to a position near the gunpowder store. British Captain Robert Corbet himself showed up with an ultimatum threatening to set the entire city on fire, should the French attack.

On the next day, des Bruslys led his force of 50 regular soldiers and 800 National Guardsman to counter the British, and found himself facing a 900-man strong expeditionary force already in Saint-Paul. Des Bruslys hesitated between launching a direct assault and building a defensive line to contain the British. In the evening, he retreated to Saint-Denis in order to organise its defense against a potential invasion, leaving Captain Saint-Michel to negotiate with the British.

On 23 September, des Bruslys refused to sign the capitulation act written in Saint-Paul. Battalion-chief Justin Soleille, the deputy director of fortifications on the island since 1804, threatened des Bruslys with a decree issued on 2 February 1794 which made "cowardice on the battlefield" punishable by death should he not order an assault. Since des Bruslys wanted neither to surrender nor to order an assault which he deemed would have ended in a needless bloodbath, he wrote a note stating:

I do not want to be a traitor to my country; I do not want to sacrifice inhabitants in the needless defence of this open island. From what I foresee of the effects of the hatred or ambition of a few individuals holding to a revolutionary sect, death on the gallows awaits me... I would rather give it to myself. I recommend my wife and children to Providence and sensitive souls.

Bruslys then attempted to kill himself with his sabre, but failed. He then tried to blow his head off by detonating two sacks of gunpowder tied to his neck, but the powder failed to explode properly and left him severely burned. He eventually slit his carotid with his razor, successfully killing himself.

His widow obtained a 1000-franc pension in 1811.
