= Jean-Joseph =

Jean-Joseph is a given name. Notable people with the name include:

- Jean Joseph Marie Amiot (1718–1793), French Jesuit missionary
- Jean-Joseph Ange d'Hautpoul (1754–1807), French cavalry general of the Napoleonic wars
- Jean-Joseph Ansiaux (1764–1840), historical and portrait painter
- Jean-Joseph Balechou (1715–1765), French engraver
- Jean-Joseph Benjamin-Constant (1845–1902), French painter and etcher
- Jean-Joseph-Xavier Bidauld (1758–1846), French painter
- Jean Joseph Charles Louis Blanc (1811–1882), French politician and historian
- Jean Joseph Bott (1826–1895), German violinist and composer
- Jean-Joseph Carriès (1855–1894), French sculptor, ceramist, and miniaturist
- Jean-Joseph Casot (1728–1800), Jesuit, came from France to Canada in 1757 as a lay brother
- Jean-Joseph Chapuis (1765–1864), French cabinetmaker of the 18th and 19th centuries
- Jean-Joseph Charlier (1794–1886), Belgian revolutionary
- Jean Joseph Jacques Chretien (born 1934), PC, OM, CC, QC, 20th Prime Minister of Canada
- Jean Joseph Antoine de Courvoisier (1775–1835), French magistrate and politician
- Jean-Joseph Dassy, a French historical and portrait painter and lithographer
- Jean Joseph Delambre (1749–1822), French mathematician and astronomer
- Jean-Joseph Denis (1876–1960), lawyer, judge and political figure in Quebec
- Jean-Joseph, Marquis Dessolles (1767–1828), French statesman
- Jean Joseph Dussault (1769–1824), French librarian
- Jean-Joseph Espercieux (1757–1840), French sculptor
- Jean-Joseph-Alexandre Falguière (1831–1900), French sculptor and painter
- Jean Joseph Frédéric Adolphe Farre (1816–1887), French general and statesman
- Jean-Joseph Fiocco (1686–1746), Flemish (Belgian) composer of the high and late Baroque period
- Jean-Joseph Foucou (1739–1821), French sculptor
- Jean-Joseph Gaume (1802–1879), French Roman Catholic theologian and author
- Jean-Joseph Languet de Gergy (1677–1753), French ecclesiastic and theologian
- Jean-Joseph Sourbader de Gimat, volunteer French officer in the Continental Army during the American Revolutionary War
- Jean-Joseph Girouard (1794–1855), notary and political figure in Lower Canada
- Jean Joseph Guieu (1758–1817), joined the French royal army and quickly rose in rank during the French Revolutionary Wars
- Jean-Joseph Hirth (1854–1931), Catholic Bishop in German East Africa, known as the founder of the church in Rwanda
- Jean Joseph Hubert (1765–1805), French Navy officer and captain
- Jean Joseph Amable Humbert (1767–1823), French soldier, a participant in the French Revolution
- Jean Joseph Jacotot (1770–1840), French teacher and educational philosopher
- Jean Joseph Marie Auguste Jaures (1859–1914), French Socialist leader
- Ernst Jean-Joseph (1948–2020), Haitian football midfielder
- Jimmy Jean-Joseph (born 1972), former French athlete who specialised in the 800 meters
- Leverrier, Urbain Jean Joseph (1811–1877), French mathematician who specialized in celestial mechanics
- Napoleon Eugene Louis Jean Joseph (1856–1879), Prince Imperial, Fils de France
- Jean-Joseph de Laborde, marquis de Laborde (1724–1794), French politician
- Jean Joseph Etienne Lenoir (1822–1900), Belgian engineer who developed the internal combustion engine in 1858
- Jean-Joseph Loiseaux (1815–1904), known as Piatus of Mons, French theologian and Capuchin
- Etienne-Jean-Joseph-Alexandre MacDonald (1765–1840), Marshal of France, military leader during the French Revolutionary and Napoleonic Wars
- Jean-Joseph Marcel (1776–1854), French printer and engineer
- Édouard Jean Joseph de Laborde de Marchainville (1762–1786), French explorer and naval officer
- Jean Joseph Martin (1837–1910), French Archetier / Bowmaker
- Gabriel Jean Joseph Molitor (1770–1849), Marshal of France
- Jean-Joseph de Mondonville (1711–1772), French violinist and composer
- Jean-Joseph Monnard (1901–1973), French ice hockey player
- Jean Joseph Mounier (1758–1806), French politician and judge
- Jean-Joseph Mouret (1682–1738), French composer
- Jean-Joseph Perraud (1819–1876), French academic sculptor
- Jean-Joseph Petit-Didier (1659–1728), French Benedictine theologian and ecclesiastical historian
- Jean Joseph Magdeleine Pijon (1758–1799), French general killed in combat during the French Revolutionary Wars
- Jean Joseph François Poujoulat (1808–1880), French historian and journalist
- Jean Joseph Rabearivelo (1901–1937), widely considered to be Africa's first modern poet
- Jean-Joseph Raepsaet (1750–1832), Belgian politician and historian
- Jean-Joseph Raikem (1787–1875), Roman Catholic Belgian politician, president of the National Congress of Belgium
- Jean-Joseph Regnault (1834–1894), French economist
- Jean-Joseph Renaud (1873–1953), French fencer
- Jean-Joseph Rodolphe (1730–1812), Alsatian horn player, violinist and composer
- Jean Joseph Rolette (1781–1842), fur trader and member of the Mackinac Company
- Jean-Joseph Patu de Rosemont (1767–1818), French painter
- Jean Joseph Seznec (1905–1983), historian and mythographer
- Jean-Joseph Sue (1710–1792), French surgeon and anatomist
- Jean-Joseph Surin (1600–1665), French Jesuit mystic, preacher, devotional writer and exorcist
- Jean-Joseph Taillasson (1745–1809), French history painter and portraitist, draftsman and art critic
- Jean-Joseph-François Tassaert (1765–1835), French painter and engraver
- Jean-Joseph Thonissen (1817–1891), professor of law at the Catholic University of Leuven
- Jean Joseph Henri Toussaint (1847–1890), French veterinarian born in Rouvres-la-Chétive, department of Vosges
- Jean-Joseph Trestler (1757–1813), German-born businessman, land owner and political figure in Lower Canada
- Jean Joseph Vaudechamp (1790–1866), French painter born in Rambervillers, Vosges
- Jean-Joseph Vinache (1696–1754), French sculptor

== See also ==
- Jean (male given name)
- Joseph
