= Shelf Life =

Shelf Life, Shelf life, or Shelflife may refer to:

- Shelf life, the length of time that perishable items are considered suitable for storage, sale, use, or consumption

== Music ==
- "Shelf Life", a song by Seven Mary Three from The Crow: City of Angels film soundtrack
- "Shelf Life", a song by Violent Soho from their 2020 album Everything Is A-OK
- Shelf-Life (album), 2004 album by Uri Caine
- Shelf Life (Northeast Party House album), 2020 album by Northeast Party House
- Shelflife, 2007 album by Calibre

== Other uses ==
- Shelf Life (film), a 1993 American film by Paul Bartel
- Shelf Life (novel), a 2004 novel by Robert Corbet
- "Shelf Life" (The Fairly OddParents), a 2004 television episode
- "Shelf Life" (Suits), a 2011 television episode
- Shelf Life, a web series by Yuri Lowenthal and Tara Platt

== See also ==
- Service life
