= Robert Corbet =

Royal Navy officer

Captain Robert Corbet
- Died: 13 September 1810; HMS Africaine, off Île Bourbon, Indian Ocean
- Military career
- Allegiance: United Kingdom
- Branch: Royal Navy
- Service years: 1790s to 1810
- Rank: Captain
- Conflicts: French Revolutionary Wars; Napoleonic Wars; Raid on Saint Paul; Action of 13 September 1810

Captain Robert Corbet (died 13 September 1810) was a Royal Navy officer who served in the French Revolutionary and Napoleonic Wars and was killed in action in highly controversial circumstances. Corbet was a strict disciplinarian who regularly beat his men for the slightest infractions: so brutal was his regime that he provoked two mutinies, one simply at the rumour he was coming aboard a ship. These uprisings caused him to become even more vicious in his use of punishments and when he took the frigate HMS Africaine into action off Île Bourbon in September 1810, his men failed to support him and may even have murdered him. In addition to his obsession with discipline and obedience, Corbet was regarded as an inefficient commander, whose standards of gunnery and training were so poor that when his ship did go into action it was ill-equipped to fight the French frigates stationed in the Indian Ocean.

== Early service ==
Corbet was born in Shropshire; otherwise little is known of his childhood and youth. No connection of Corbet's paternal line has been discovered to the ancient Shropshire armigerous family: his parents were Robert Corbet of Wexford, Ireland, a captain in the Royal Navy, and Susannah Woodward; his grandfather was the Rev. Francis Corbet, Dean of St Patrick's, Dublin; his great-grandfather was Thomas Corbet, a merchant from Dunganon, Tyrone. In December 1796, he was promoted to lieutenant and in 1801 served in the Egyptian campaign in command of the cutter Fulminante. She was wrecked off the coast of Egypt while under his command.

In 1802 he was promoted to commander and in 1803 took command of the sloop HMS Bittern in the Mediterranean, catching the eye of Lord Horatio Nelson, who was impressed by him and in 1805 promoted him to captain in command of the frigate HMS Amfitrite. Whilst in command of Bittern he chased a French privateer, Hirondelle, for 36 hours in a flat calm, with his crew at the sweeps the whole time. Four months later he moved to HMS Seahorse and in 1806 was transferred to the Jamaica station.

In November 1806, Corbet returned to Britain and commissioned HMS Nereide, escorting transport ships to the British invasion of the River Plate. During his time in command of Nereide, Corbet gained a reputation for brutality, inflicting 134 floggings in just 211 days, with an average of 17 lashes each time. Even by the standards of the time, this was a vicious regime. After the collapse of the expedition, Nereide was attached to the squadron at the Cape of Good Hope and in 1808 was sent for refit at Bombay. On arrival Corbet assumed command of the port over the local officers, provoking a strong rebuke from the admiral in command of the Far East station, Sir Edward Pellew. In Bombay his crew, frustrated by the brutal and arbitrary treatment meted out by their captain, issued a complaint against him. In response Corbet requested a formal court martial, but was forced to wait until his ship returned to the Cape of Good Hope due to a shortage of captains of sufficient rank. Corbet neglected to explain this to the crew and when he ordered them to sail for the Cape they mutinied in the belief that their complaint had been ignored. The mutiny was suppressed by local forces in Bombay and when Nereide did reach the Cape ten men were tried and one hanged for disobedience. At his court martial, Corbet insisted that "Severity must depend upon circumstances, and whenever I have been severe, circumstances have rendered it necessary" and was cleared of unnecessary cruelty, instead being issued with a minor reprimand for beating his men with sticks larger than those required by Admiralty instructions.

== Mauritius campaign ==
In late 1808, Nereide was attached to the squadron under Josias Rowley ordered to blockade the French colonies of Île Bonaparte and Île de France. In the action of 31 May 1809, French frigate Caroline captured two East Indiamen and took them into Saint Paul on Île Bonaparte. Rowley counterattacked by storming the port and capturing the East Indiamen and Caroline. Corbet and Nereide played an important part in the attack, entering the harbour to engage the French ships from close range. Caroline was renamed HMS Bourbonnaise and Corbet given command, sent back to Britain with despatches.

On arrival in Britain in early 1810, Corbet was transferred to HMS Africaine, which ship was deemed more appropriate for service in the Indian Ocean, to which Corbet was ordered to return. When word that Corbet was to take command arrived on board Africaine, the crew protested to the Admiralty, furious that such a brutal captain had been placed in command of them. They also warned that they would take steps to prevent Corbet from embarking the ship should he attempt to come aboard. Claiming mutiny, Corbet requested support and Admiral Edward Buller was sent aboard to listen to the crew's complaints. In addition, the frigate HMS Menelaus pulled alongside and threatened to fire on the mutineers unless they allowed Corbet aboard. Under pressure, the crew relented and Corbet took command.

Returning to the Indian Ocean, Corbet was destined for Madras when he stopped at Rodriguez and discovered that most of Rowley's squadron had been destroyed at the Battle of Grand Port. Recognising that Rowley needed urgent reinforcement, Corbet immediately sailed to Île de France. Arriving off the island on 11 September, Rowley discovered the small French ship No. 23 sheltering inshore and attacked it with his ship's boats. The attack was a failure, with the boat party suffering heavy casualties, and Corbet sailed for Île Bourbon (formerly Île Bonaparte) to land his wounded. There he united with Rowley's flagship HMS Boadicea and two smaller ships and attacked the French blockading force of the frigates Astrée and Iphigénie under Pierre Bouvet.

== Death ==
During the night of 12 September, Africaine outran her compatriots and attacked both French ships in the darkness. On the second broadside from Astrée, Corbet's right foot was shot off, the captain collapsing to the deck and being taken below. Although their captain had gone, the crew continued to fight and Astrée hauled off to allow Iphigénie to attack. Two hours later, Africaine surrendered, her casualties mounting and the ship in a battered state. The French took possession but later abandoned the ship when Boadicea arrived. By the time British officers had resumed control of the ship, Corbet was dead.

Almost immediately rumours spread that his death had not simply been the result of his wound: stories were repeated in reputable histories that Corbet had either been murdered by his crew, or committed suicide to avoid the shame of defeat. Though the truth remains unknown, Corbet's crew had indeed displayed an unwillingness to enter action with him in command and once he was dead expressed a desire to pursue the French ships despite their own damage and casualties.

The debate about Corbet's final action continued for many years. The contemporary historian Basil Hall was the subject of a lawsuit in 1820 over his claim that Corbet's men had refused to load their cannon and preferred death at the hands of the French to continued service under their brutal captain. The case was proven and Hall forced to make a retraction. Attention has also focused on Corbet's failure to train his men in the accurate and efficient use of their cannon, preferring to maintain the order and cleanliness of his ship than exercise his gun teams.

== In literature ==
Corbet and a fictionalized account of the events leading up to his death appear in Patrick O'Brian's 1977 novel The Mauritius Command, in which Rowley is replaced as the commander of the squadron by O'Brian's protagonist, Jack Aubrey.

== See also ==
- Fragging – a term, originating with US troops during the Vietnam War, for killing unpopular officers
