= John Hatley =

British Navy Officer

Captain John Hatley
- Born: c. 1762
- Died: 12 December 1832; Dover, Kent
- Military career
- Allegiance: United Kingdom
- Branch: Royal Navy
- Rank: Captain
- Conflicts: French Revolutionary Wars; Napoleonic Wars; Raid on Saint Paul

Captain John Hatley (c. 1762 – 12 December 1832) was an officer of the British Royal Navy during the late eighteenth and early nineteenth centuries. Hatley is most noted for being one of the junior officers on board Captain James Cook's third voyage in HMS Resolution, aged approximately 14. He later went on to serve in the French Revolutionary and Napoleonic Wars, receiving promotion after helping to thwart a mutiny in 1797 and later commanding frigates in several campaigns.

== Military service ==
Hatley, born in c. 1762, joined the Royal Navy at a young age and in his first posting was attached to Captain James Cook's ship HMS Resolution. This vessel had secretly been ordered to search what is now the Alaskan Coast for the Northwest Passage. Leaving Britain in 1776, the ship reached Tahiti the following year and returned Omai, Captain Cook's translator and guide, to his home. From there, the vessel sailed north and visited the Hawaiian Islands, the Sandwich Islands and was the first European ship to visit and chart the coastline from California to Alaska. During 1778, Cook's behaviour became gradually more unpredictable, until in 1779 he returned to Hawaii to effect repairs on his ship prior to returning to Europe. There he was killed by Hawaiian warriors during a dispute over stolen goods. The survivors of the expedition finally returned to Britain in 1780.

In 1782, in recognition of his service on the exploratory voyage, Hatley was promoted to lieutenant and ordered to join HMS Active for service in the East Indies. He remained a lieutenant, serving in various ships, until 1797 when he was embroiled in a mutiny aboard HMS St George. The problems arose against the backdrop of the Spithead Mutiny in Britain, when malcontents in the Mediterranean Fleet, at this time stationed off Cádiz, were seized at the orders of Earl St Vincent. These men were sentenced to death by court martial on Saturday and due to be executed on the Sunday morning. St George was chosen as the vessel on which the sentences would be carried out. The crew were strongly opposed to carrying out these executions on a Sunday and brought a petition to Captain Shuldham Peard, who passed it on to St Vincent. The admiral's reply was that the sentences were justified and must be carried out with alacrity. Infuriated, sections of the crew prepared to seize the ship and gathered on deck, where they were met by Peard and Hatley, the ship's second in command. Addressing his men, Peard attempted to calm them but without effect. Seeking to prevent a mutiny and ensuing massacre, Peard and Hatley then charged the mass of sailors and seized two ringleaders. The next day the scheduled executions were carried out and a week later the two men captured by Peard and Hatley were similarly hanged. For his services on this occasion, Hatley was promoted to commander.

In the Napoleonic Wars, Hatley commanded the frigate HMS Winchelsea in the West Indies and later in the Mediterranean where he was awarded a gold medal for services to the Ottoman Empire. At the funeral of Horatio Nelson, Hatley formed part of the procession that accompanied the coffin to St. Paul's Cathedral. In 1808, Hatley commanded the frigate HMS Boadicea during the campaign in the Indian Ocean and participated in the Raid on Saint Paul. The following winter he switched with Commodore Josias Rowley and took command of the ship of the line HMS Raisonnable which was returning to Britain for a refit. He retired at the end of the Napoleonic Wars and died in Dover, Kent on 12 December 1832 and was remembered as the last survivor of Captain Cook's voyages.
