= Robert Corbett =

Robert Corbett may refer to:

- Robert Corbett (Canadian politician) (1938–2025), member of the House of Commons of Canada
- Robert J. Corbett (1905–1971), Republican member of the U.S. House of Representatives from Pennsylvania
- Robert Corbett (British Army officer) (born 1940)
- Bobby Corbett (1922–1988), English football defender
- Bob Corbett (footballer) (1895–1957), Australian rules footballer
- Robert Paul Corbett, the author of LALR parser generators GNU Bison and Berkeley Yacc

== See also ==
- Robert Corbet (disambiguation)
- Corbett (surname)
