= Action of 31 May 1809 =

1809 battle of the Mauritius campaign of 1809–1811

- Part of the Mauritius campaign of 1809–1811
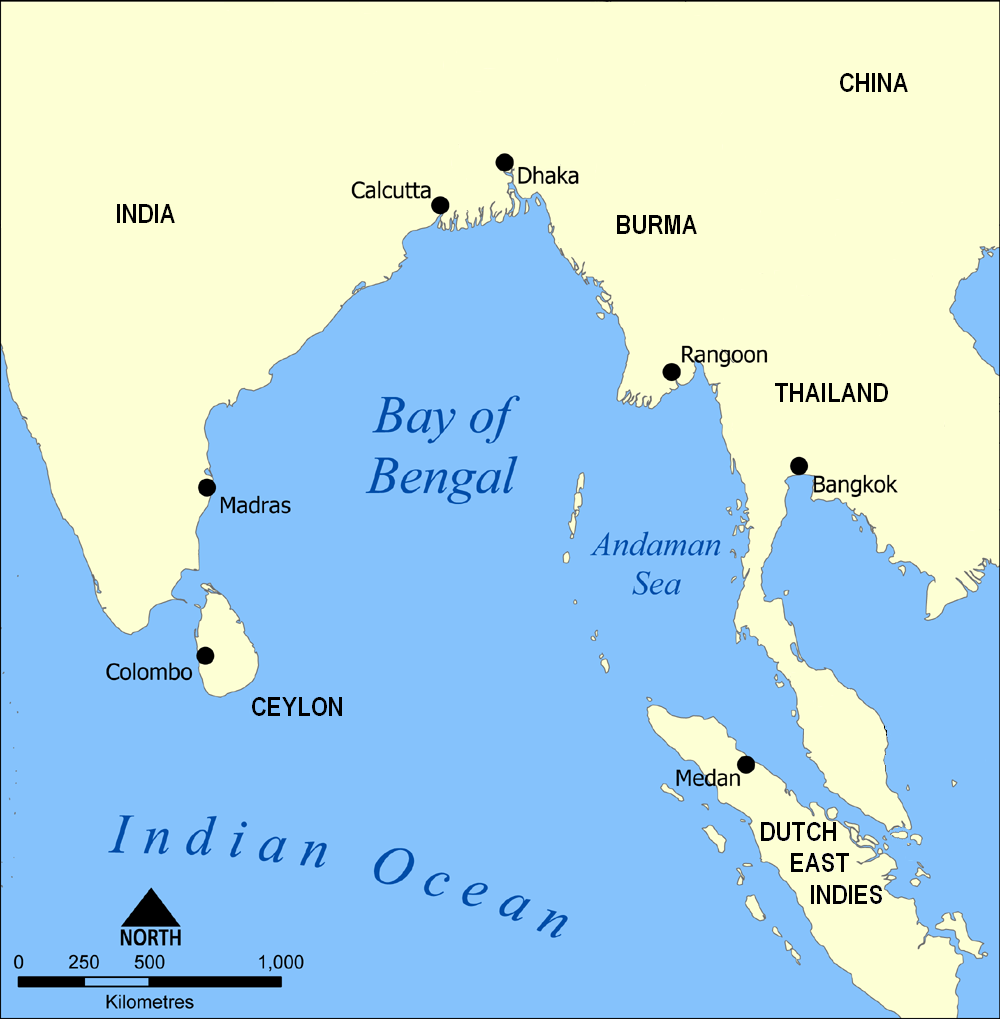
- Location of the action of 31 May 1809
Date	31 May 1809
Location	Bay of Bengal, Indian Ocean 9°15′N 90°30′E
Result	French victory

Belligerents
France	East India Company

Commanders and leaders
Jean Féretier	John Dale

Strength
1 frigate	3 merchant ships

Casualties and losses
1 killed 4 wounded	6 killed 4 wounded 2 merchant ships captured

The action of 31 May 1809 was a naval skirmish in the Bay of Bengal during the Napoleonic Wars. During the action, East India Company convoy carrying goods worth over £500,000 was attacked and partially captured by the French frigate Caroline. The three East Indiamen that made up the convoy fought against their opponent with their own batteries of cannon but ultimately were less powerful, less manoeuvrable and less trained than their opponent and were defeated one by one; only the smallest of the three escaped. The action was the first in a string of attacks on important convoys in the Indian Ocean by French cruisers operating from Isle de France and Isle Bonaparte during a concerted campaign against British shipping in the region.

== Background ==
In November 1808, a squadron of powerful French frigates sailed for Isle de France under Commodore Jacques Hamelin. This squadron was under orders to attack and capture or destroy British shipping in the Indian Ocean, particularly the heavily armed convoys of East Indiamen that carried millions of pounds worth of trade goods from British India and the Far East to Britain. These convoys were operated by the East India Company (EIC), which ran British India and maintained a private army and navy to secure the colony and its trade routes. During the late Napoleonic Wars, French naval strategy focused on the disruption of this trade with the use of fast and well-armed frigates to operate independently along British trade routes and capture British merchant ships. This affected the British economy, which was already severely stretched by the war, and forced the Royal Navy to divert resources to distant parts of the world to protect British trade.

During the late spring of 1809, following the end of the Indian Ocean hurricane season, Hamelin ordered his ships to operate in the Bay of Bengal. One of these frigates was the 40-gun Caroline, which was built in Antwerp in 1806 and had a burthen of 1,078 tons (bm). Caroline was commanded by Jean-Baptiste-Henri Féretier, newly promoted following the sudden death of her previous captain. Féretier was the first of Hamelin's captains to find a British convoy, spotting three sails on the horizon on 31 May. These belonged to a Britain-bound convoy of East Indiamen, which had departed the Hooghly River on 2 May. Laden with over £500,000 worth of silk and other trade goods, these ships were an important asset to the HEIC and had originally been part of a larger convoy, guarded by the sloop HMS Victor and consisting of five Indiamen and several smaller vessels. On 24 May a storm divided the convoy; Victor and the small ships separated from the Indiamen. Two of the Indiamen, Monarch and Earl Spencer separated from the other three on 25 May; Monarch had sprung a serious leak and needed to deviate to Penang, and Earl Spencer accompanied her.

The three remaining Indiamen, Streatham, Europe, and Lord Keith, were large, and more importantly, armed. Streatham and Europe of 800 tons (bm) each and carried 30 cannon, whereas the smaller Lord Keith was 600 tons (bm) and carried 12 guns. Four years earlier, a convoy of East Indiamen had driven off a French squadron under Counter-admiral Charles-Alexandre Léon Durand Linois in similar waters by forming a battle line and firing on their opponents as they closed. The crews of these East Indiamen were not of Royal Navy standard, however, with insufficient training and large numbers of Portuguese, Chinese, and lascar seamen, who proved unreliable in combat.

== Battle ==
One of the smaller ships from the convoy, an American merchant ship named Silenus, had separated from the main body in the storm and arrived at the Nicobar Islands. There she had encountered Caroline and the American captain had reported the location and value of the convoy to Féretier. Setting all sail, Féretier took Caroline to the north-west, and sighted the convoy at 05:30, only a few days after leaving the Nicobar Islands. The British ships, under the loose command of John Dale in Streatham, originally mistook the French frigate for the missing Victor and it was not until another half-hour had passed that Dale realised the danger his ships were in. Ordering the Indiamen to form a line of battle, Dale placed his ship in the centre, with the small Lord Keith ahead and Europe behind. However, the lack of naval experience on the British ships resulted in the Indiamen sailing too far from one another in line, thus leaving them unable to provide effective mutual support.

Able to attack the HEIC ships individually, Caroline pulled alongside Europe at 06:30 and began a heavy fire into the merchant ship, which intermittently replied with her available guns. Within 30 minutes, Europe's rigging was tattered, many of her guns dismounted and a number of her crew wounded or killed. Moving past his now disabled opponent, Féretier next attacked Streatham, which had slowed in an unsuccessful attempt to support Europe. Now alone against the frigate, Streatham came under heavy fire at 07:00 and by 08:00 was badly damaged, with casualties in her crew, her guns all dismounted and her lascars hiding below decks. With further resistance hopeless, Dale hauled down the company flag and surrendered.

During the engagement between Streatham and Caroline, Lord Keith and Europe had fired sporadically at the French ship with little effect. Pulling away from his surrendered opponent, Féretier then fired on Lord Keith, whose captain, Peter Campbell, realised that his ship stood no chance against the frigate and turned eastward, running before the wind to escape despite suffering severe damage to Lord Keith's rigging as he did so. William Gelston, captain of Europe, also attempted to flee, but his battered ship was in no condition to outrun the virtually untouched frigate, and he surrendered at 10:00. Lord Keith eventually arrived safely at Penang on 9 June. Casualties on the British ships were six killed and at least four wounded, while the French lost one killed and three wounded.

== Aftermath ==
Féretier repaired his captures at sea and returned to Isle de France, arriving two months later on 22 July. Discovering the presence of a British frigate squadron under Josias Rowley off Port Louis, Féretier instead went to Saint-Paul on Isle Bonaparte. Among the goods removed from the prizes were £500,000 worth of silk, which was stored in warehouses near the docks. In a raid on Saint-Paul on 21 September 1809, the British burned the warehouses and their contents along with capturing Caroline, Streatham and Europe. Despite these subsequent losses, Féretier was highly commended for his leadership in the action and received a promotion from Governor Charles Mathieu Isidore Decaen. He also received letters from the captains of Streatham and Europe, thanking him for his attention and courtesy to their crews and passengers during their period of captivity.
