= Jean-Joseph Patu de Rosemont =

French painter

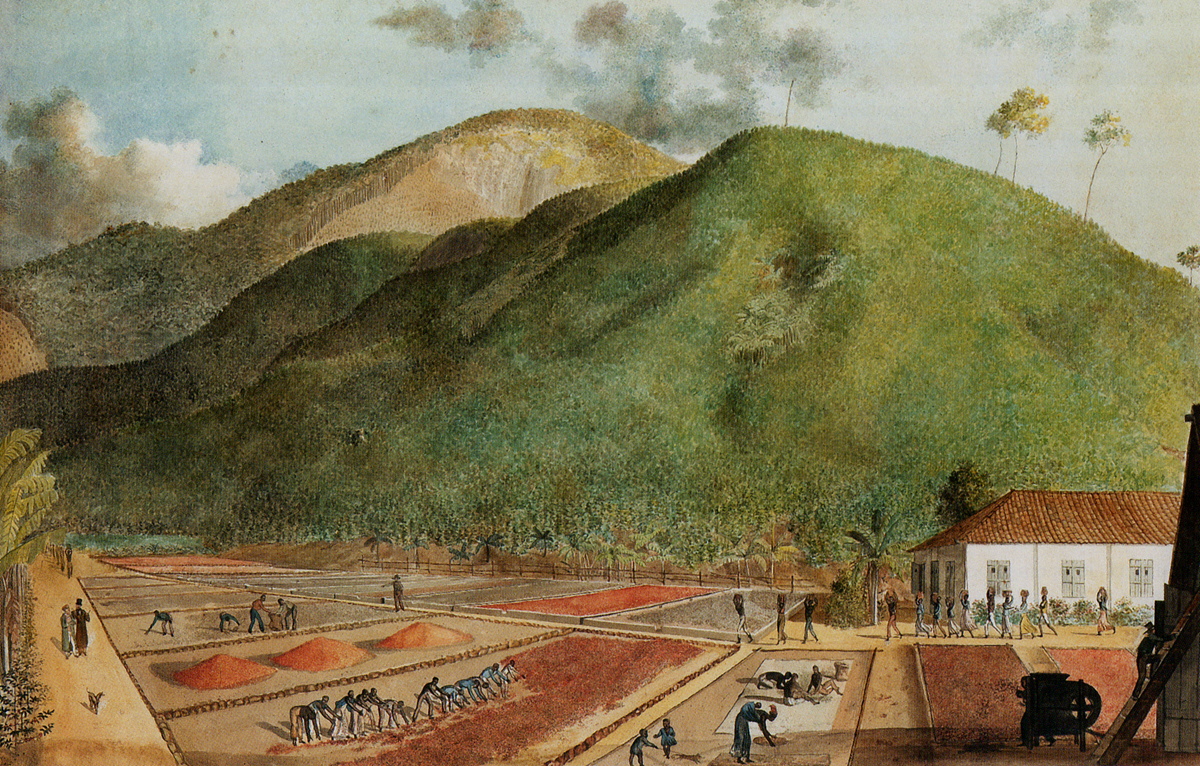
Watercolour by Jean-Joseph Patu de Rosemont depicting a slave coffee plantation at Île Bourbon.

Jean-Joseph Patu de Rosemont (1767 – 11 July 1818) was a French painter. He is mostly known for watercolours depicting landscapes from La Réunion, where he lived from 1788. Some of his paintings show the Piton de la Fournaise, whose he was one of the first known explorers.

== Biography ==
Patu de Rosemont was born to Antoine-Henry Patu des Hauts-Champs, squire, counselor to the King and auditor at the Chambre des comptes of Paris. Aged 20, he enlisted as an auxiliary officer in the French Navy; his ship was wrecked near Isle Bourbon in 1788. In 1790, he married Jeanne Tarsile Bregeault. The next year, he took part in a scientific expedition led by Alexis Bert at Piton de la Fournaise, the active volcano of the island. He explored tis tip on 29 July, a feat for which a natural formation of Enclos Fouqué, the chapelle de Rosemont, was named in his honour.

When the British attacked the island in 1809, Rosemont took part in the fighting with his son Amédée and their friend Nicole Robinet de La Serve. He was captured during the Raid on Saint-Paul in September and held prisoner aboard the British flagship. After he was released, he returned to France in 1817.
