= French frigate Néréide (1779) =

French navy frigate

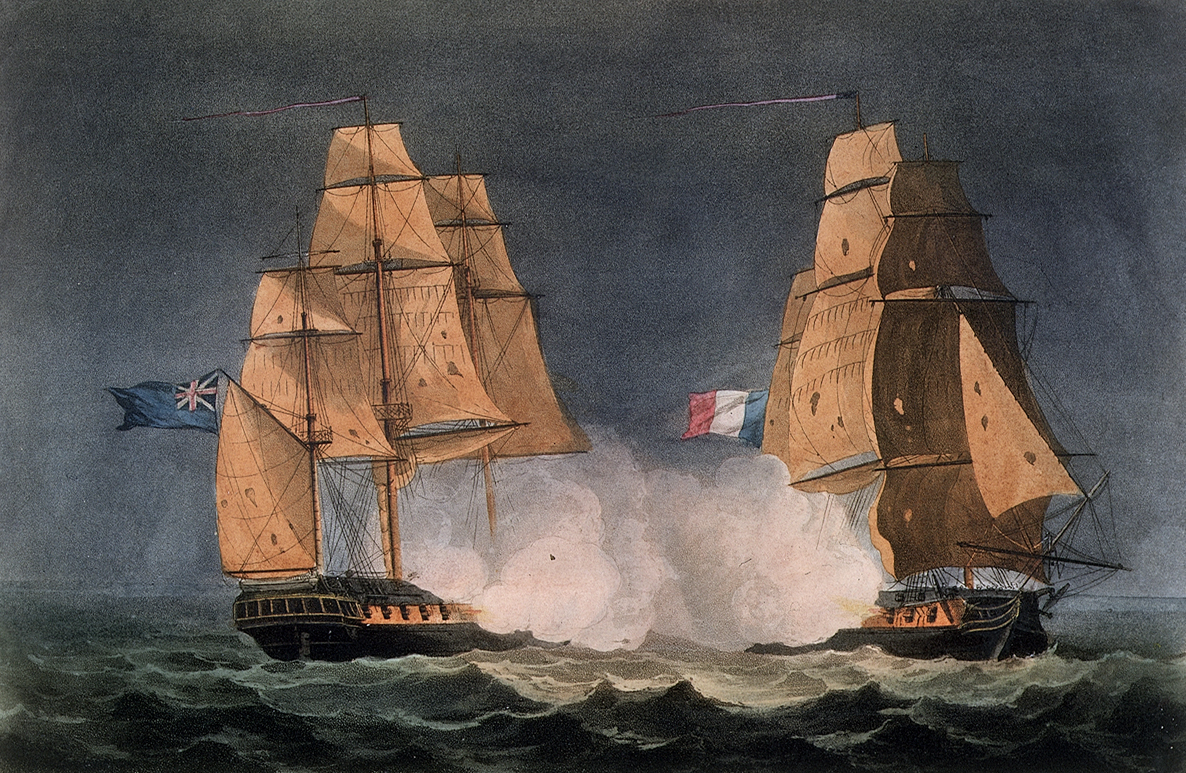
- Néréide (left) at the action of 20 December 1797

History

France
- Name: Néréide
- Namesake: Nereid
- Builder: Saint Malo, constructeur: Geoffroy, to plans by Sané
- Laid down: October 1778
- Launched: 31 May 1779
- Commissioned: August 1779
- Captured: 20 December 1797

Great Britain
- Name: Nereide
- Acquired: 20 December 1797
- Honours and awards: Naval General Service Medal with clasp "1 May Boat Service 1810"
- Captured: 23 August 1810

France
- Name: Néréide
- Acquired: Captured 23 August 1810
- Captured: 3 December 1810
- Fate: Sold 1 March 1816

General characteristics
- Class & type: Sibylle-class frigate
- Displacement: 1,082 tonneaux
- Tons burthen: 600 port tonneaux; 89222/94 (Builder's Old Measurement)
- Length: 43.91 m (144.1 ft) (overall); 39.14 m (128.4 ft) (keel)
- Beam: 11.21 m (36.8 ft)
- Draught: 5.36 m (17.6 ft) (laden)
- Propulsion: Sail
- Complement: French service: 290 British service: 254
- Armament: French service: Gun deck: 26 × 12-pounder guns; Spar deck: 6 × 6-pounder guns; British service: Upper deck: 26 × 12-pounder guns; QD: 12 × 24-pounder carronades; Fc: 4 × 24-pounder carronades

Néréide was a Sibylle-class, 32-gun, copper-hulled frigate of the French Navy. On 22 December 1797 HMS Phoebe captured her and she was taken into British service as HMS Nereide. The French recaptured her at the Battle of Grand Port, only to lose her again when the British captured Isle de France in 1810. She was in such a poor condition that the British laid her up before selling her to be broken up in 1816.

== French service ==
On 6 June 1780, along with Zodiaque (74 guns), Néréide captured a British privateer, the 10-gun cutter Prince of Wales off Madeira.

Néréide was part of the fleet of Lamotte-Picquet that sailed from Brest and on 2 May 1781 captured 18 ships in a convoy from Sint Eustatius. In 1782, she served in the Caribbean under Vaudreuil.

From 1788, Néréide served off Africa. She then underwent a refit in Rochefort in October 1794.

On 20 December 1797, she was sailing off the Isles of Scilly under the command of Lieutenant de Vaisseau Chassériau when she encountered Phoebe. After exchanging broadsides with Phoebe for about an hour and a half, Néréide struck. She had suffered 20 killed and 55 wounded; Phoebe had suffered three men killed and 10 wounded. Although the French vessel had a larger crew, she had a substantially lighter broadside (12-pdrs versus 18-pdrs) and this proved decisive. She entered into British service as HMS Nereide.

== British service ==
In the morning of 1 March 1800, Nereide saw five sail and made towards them. They were five well-armed French privateers, but they scattered as she approached. Nereide lost sight of them until the next morning when she re-encountered one. After a pursuit of 12 hours and 123 miles, Nereide captured the French privateer Vengeance, pierced for 18 guns but carrying sixteen 12-pounders and 174 men. Vengeance had left Bordeaux on 26 February and then had joined Bellona (twenty-four 12-pounder guns, six 36-pounder carronades, and 420 men), Favorite (sixteen 8-pounder guns and 120 men), Huron (sixteen 6-pounder guns and 187 men), and the schooner Terrailluse (fourteen 6-pounder guns and 80 men).

The next day (3 March), Nereide recaptured the American ship Perseverance, of Baltimore, which was carrying a cargo valued at £30,000. Then on 17 March Nereide recaptured Lord Nelson.

Nereide, Phoebe, and Kangaroo shared in the proceeds of the capture, on 5 June of the Eagle.

On 11 September Watkins sailed to Curaçao to forestall the French from taking it. However, the French had already invaded Curaçao in July. Great Britain and the United States had come to an unofficial naval alliance against the French during the War of the Second Coalition, and a nearby American naval force that had received word of the invasion from American merchants on the island were able to put ashore Marines and, with the help of naval gunnery from American frigates, to push the French out of the forts, and off the island. This solidified the capitulation of the island from the Dutch to the British, thereby denying it to the French.

On 13 October she captured American armed brig "Sukey" and sent her in to Curacao.

On 25 November 1806, Nereide was under the command of Captain Robert Corbet when she captured Brilliante, a Spanish privateer lugger of four guns with a crew of 50. She was two days out of Vigo and provisioned for a cruise of four months. Corbet was particularly pleased at the capture as she had not yet captured anything, but there were several sail in sight when Nereide commenced her pursuit.

On 15 July 1808, Nereide, Otter, and Charwell shared in the capture of the French brig Lucie, and her cargo of slaves. (Note: A first-class share of the bounty-money was worth £8 16s 6 1/2d; a sixth-class share, that of an ordinary seaman, was worth 3s 1d.) In December Nereide captured the French brig Gobe Mouche after a chase on the morning of the 18th. She was pierced for 12 guns but had thrown most overboard during the chase. She was under the command of Enseigne de vaisseau provisoir Sugor, and was sailing from the Seychelles to Port Louis with dispatches. She threw them overboard, but Nereide's boat crew was able to retrieve a considerable part of them. Gobe Mouche had a complement of 80 men, but had only 30 on board when captured as she had had to man a number of prizes on her previous cruise. (Note: Some French records give the vessel's name as Gobe-Mouches. She was launched and stationed at Port Louis, Île de France. She had been designed or built by Grisard as a schooner of eight 12-pounder cannons, was launched in 1806, and commissioned on 1 April 1806. From Île de France she cruised the Indian Ocean, the Red Sea, and the Persian Gulf before her capture.) (Note: Gobe Mouche had on board a large (207-pound) tortoise (testudo elephantaopus) from the Seychelles for General de Caen, the governor of Isle de France (Mauritius). Admiral Bertie, who commanded at the Cape of Good Hope, sent it to England, where it survived only until 1810 at Petworth House.)

On 20 October 1808, Nereide recaptured HCS Sylph, a 78-ton schooner of the Bombay Marine. Joasmi ([Al Qasimi]) Arabs had just captured Sylph and slaughtered almost the entire crew. Nereide's arrived just in time to save the remaining crew, who had hidden themselves below deck.

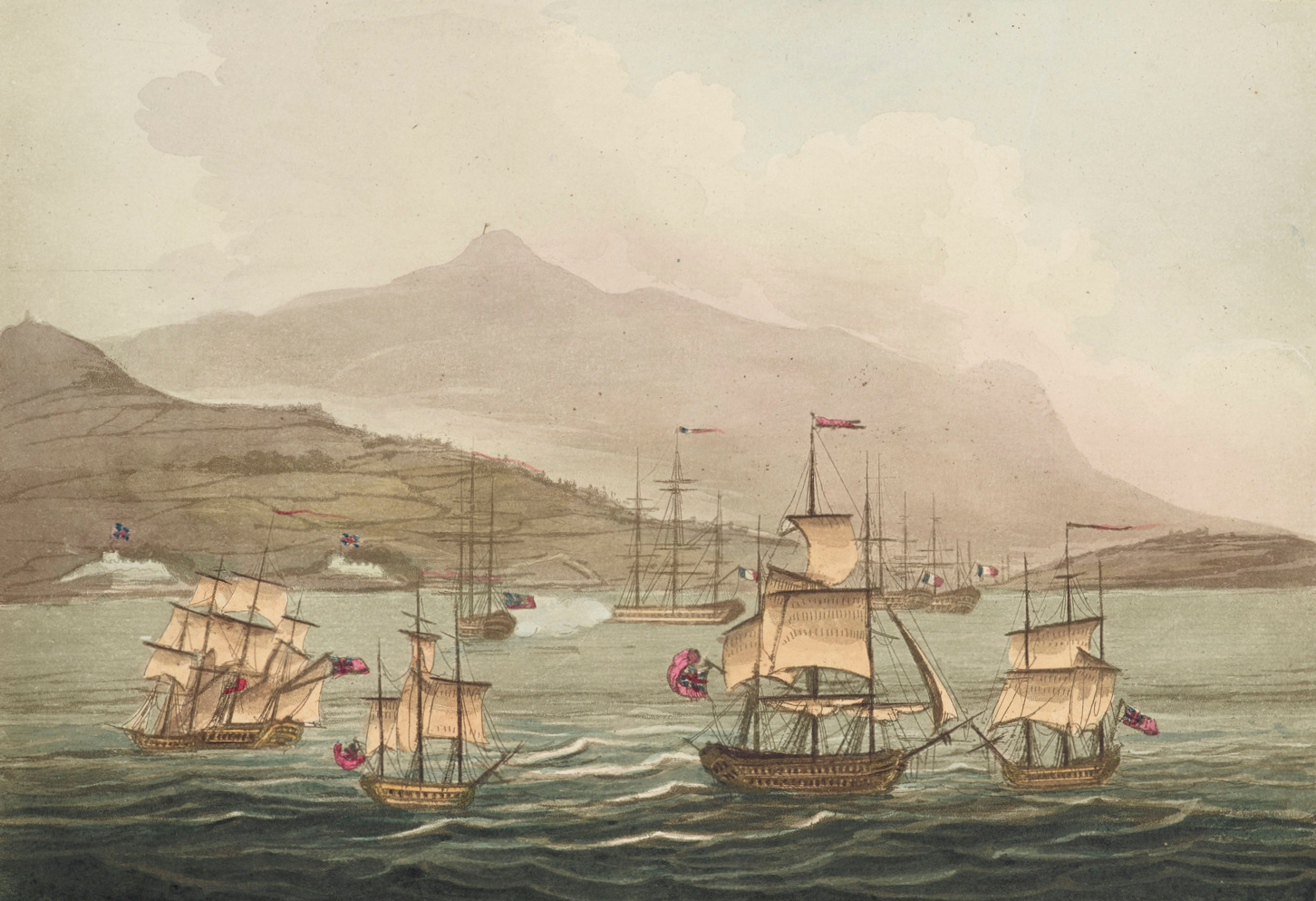
A view showing Néréide attacking Saint Paul's Island 21 September 1809. The advanced British Frigate, is the Sirius, Capt. Pym, raking the French frigate La Caroline.

In 1809, Nereide served as convoy escort. In September, still under the command of Corbet, she played a critical part in the Raid on Saint Paul at Île Bourbon (now Réunion). There Nereide and the landing party captured the frigate Caroline, and recovered the East Indiamen Streatham and Europa, and the 14-gun Bombay Marine brig Grappler. The British also captured some merchant vessels and destroyed several forts and batteries.

In 1810, Nereide came under the command of Captain William Gordon, and then Captain Nesbit Willoughby.

In March 1810, Nereide joined Iphigenia, Leopard and Magicienne off Isle de France. On 1 May Nereide sent in her boats, under Willoughby's personal command, into the bay at Jacotet (or Jacotel). They captured the 4-gun packet schooner Estafette, spiked the guns of two forts, and two field pieces, captured several prisoners, and destroyed some buildings. On board Estafette the British also found 600 pieces of mail that provided an insight into the state of the French colony. Nereide had one man killed and seven wounded. In 1847 the Admiralty issued the Naval General Service Medal with clasp "1 May Boat Service 1810" to all surviving claimants from the action.

Then on 2 June, Nereide intercepted and captured near the Cape the 1-gun schooner-aviso Mouche No. 23, which had come out from France. On 30 August, Astrée recaptured Mouche No.23.

Next, Willoughby and Nereide were at the invasion of Île Bonaparte, which took place between 7 and 9 July. Willoughby led the amphibious assault in Estafette to secure the beach and organise the landing forces. However, as Estafette approached the beach the wind strengthened and built up a powerful surf, which smashed the schooner ashore with enough force to break her and the accompanying boats apart: four of the 150-strong landing party were drowned.

== Recapture ==
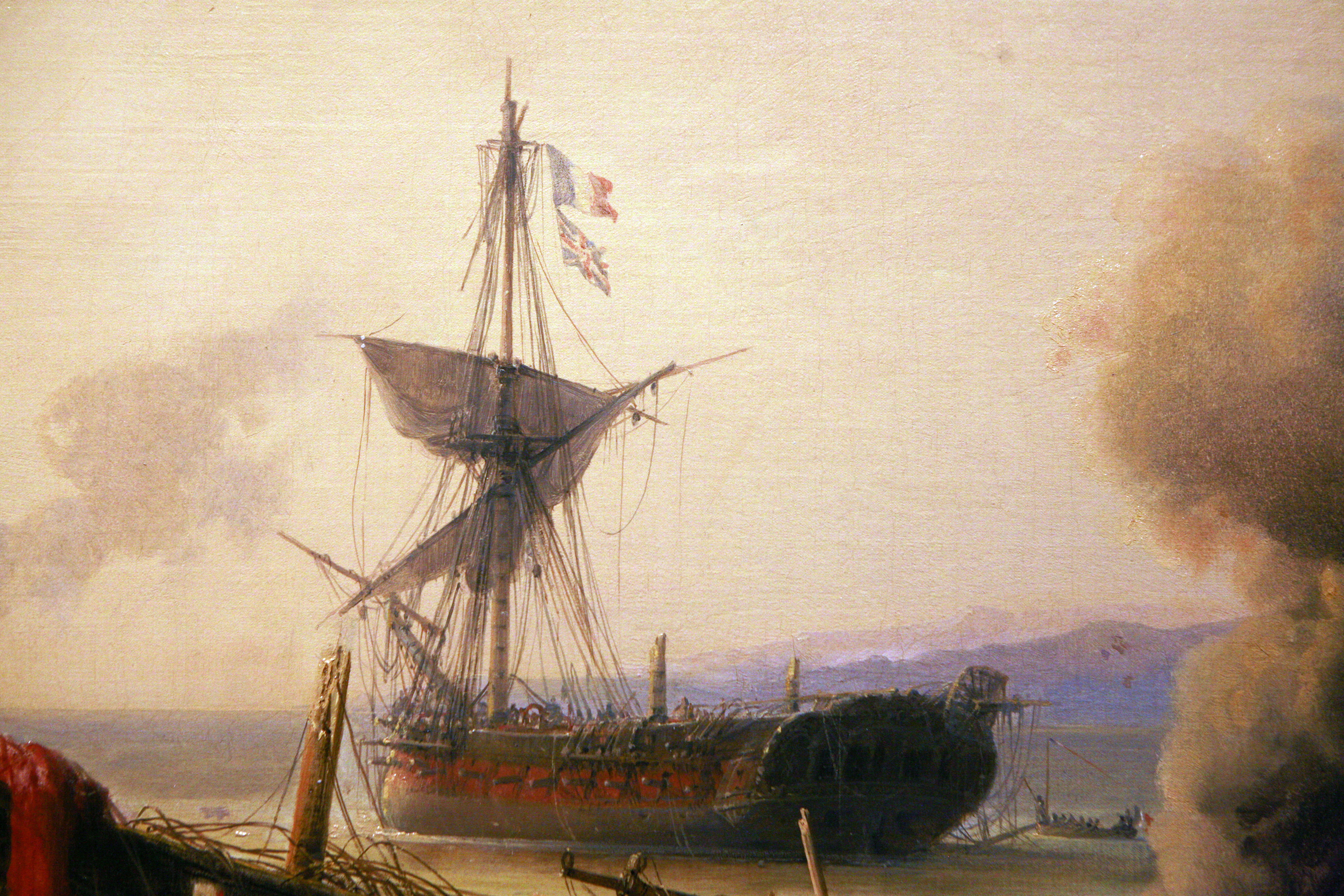
HMS Nereide at the Battle of Grand Port

Nereide was under the command of Captain Willoughby when she took part in the Battle of Grand Port on 28 August 1810. There she was severely battered and eventually captured.

The French took Nereide into service but it is not clear that she had any officers or crew. The British captured her in December 1810 after their successful invasion of Isle de France on 4 December 1810. All her former British officers and crew were in prison ships at Grand Port and qualified for the prize money that followed the capture of the island. (Note: A first-class share was worth £278 19s 5 3/4d; a sixth-class share, that of an ordinary seaman, was worth £3 7s 6 1/4d. A fourth and final payment was made in July 1828. A first-class share was worth £29 19s 5 1/4d; a sixth-class share was worth 8s 2 1/2d.)

== Fate ==
Nereide was in such a bad shape that she was laid up. She was sold at Port Louis on 1 March 1816 for breaking up.

== See also ==
- List of French sail frigates
- List of ships captured in the 18th century
