= Shelf Life (novel) =

2004 novel by Robert Corbet

- Author: Robert Corbet
- Language: English
- Genre: Young adult fiction
- Publisher: Allen & Unwin
- Publication date: June 1, 2004
- Publication place: Australia
- Media type: Print (hardback, paperback)
- Pages: 192 pages
- ISBN: 0802789595

Shelf Life is a 2004 young adult novel by Robert Corbet. The book was first published in Australia on June 1, 2004 through Allen & Unwin and focuses on the workers of an unnamed supermarket. Shelf Life was nominated as one of the CBCA's "Notable Books of 2005" in the "Older Readers" category.

== Synopsis ==
The novel deals with an unnamed supermarket and the various people who work there. Each chapter is named after an aisle of the store, but may only have some minor references to it. There are other smaller chapters that deal with other areas such as Accounts and Service Desk. Each character has one chapter about them, which usually involves their current situation, then goes into a flashback about what had happened beforehand.

== Reception ==
Shelf Life has received reviews from various publications such as the School Library Journal and the Horn Book Guide. Publishers Weekly gave a mostly positive review, saying that "Given their mismatched personalities and interests, it seems unlikely that they could form a team, but some touching moments arise when their loyalties to each other unexpectedly emerge.".
