= Nesbit Willoughby =

British naval officer (1777–1849)

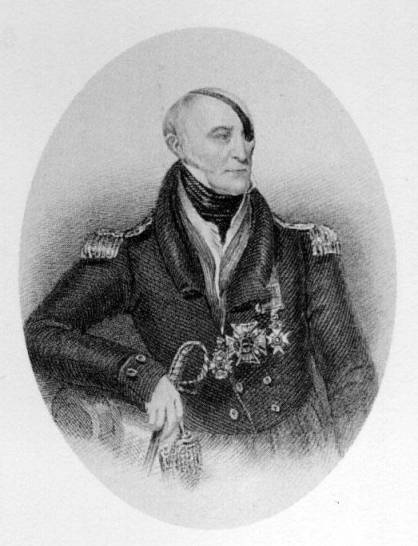
Nesbit Josiah Willoughby

Rear-Admiral Sir Nesbit Josiah Willoughby (29 August 1777 – 19 May 1849) was an officer in the British Royal Navy who was knighted in 1827 and made rear-admiral in 1847. He is related to Sir Hugh Willoughby (died 1554), who also figures in British naval history.

== Life ==
Willoughby entered the Royal Navy in 1790 and was present at the Battle of Copenhagen. In 1801, however, he was dismissed from the service by the sentence of a court-martial for his insolent conduct towards a superior officer, a previous offence of this kind having been punished less severely. In 1803, on the renewal of war, as a volunteer he joined an English squadron bound for the West Indies and was soon admitted again to the navy; his courage and promptness at Cape Francais during the Blockade of Saint-Domingue were responsible for saving 900 lives, and he distinguished himself on other occasions, being soon restored to his former rank in the service.

After further services in the West Indies, during which he displayed marked gallantry on several occasions, Willoughby was tried by court-martial at Cape Town in 1808 on charges of cruelty; he seems to have taken a great delight in inflicting punishment, but he was acquitted with the advice to be more moderate in his language in the future.

While commanding the frigate Nereide in 1810, he was largely responsible for the severe defeat of his ships against a French force commanded by Guy-Victor Duperré (144 guns and 600 men for the French squadron versus 174 guns and 1,170 men for the British) at the Battle of Grand Port during the Mauritius campaign of 1809–1811, when 222 out of his crew of 281 men were disabled before he surrendered. Willoughby was seriously wounded during the battle when a splinter struck him in the face and caused his eye to dislodge from its socket. He was treated in the same room as Duperré, also wounded during the combat, after the battle.

Undeterred by the severe wounds which he had received, and seeing no prospect of active service with the British fleet, Willoughby offered his services in 1812 to the Russian government. While serving with the Russian army he was captured by the French. He eventually escaped from France to England. Having seen a little more service in the navy he died unmarried in London on 19 May 1849.

He is buried in Kensal Green Cemetery, London, in Catacomb B under the Anglican Chapel, which had been completed in 1838 to designs by that cemetery's designer, John Griffiths. Willoughby "had the unusual distinction of being knighted twice, in 1827 and 1832. On the second occasion he was invested with the insignia of a K.C.H. Knight Commander of the Hanoverian Order, a curious blunder on the part of King William IV." He is remembered as one of the most reckless characters in British naval history, partially due to his being court martialled four times.

The Annual Register of his death noted: "He was eleven times wounded with balls, three times with splinters, and cut in every part of his body with sabres and tomahawkes: his face was disfigured by explosions of gunpowder, and he lost an eye and had part of his neck and jaw shot away... and at Leipzig had his right arm shattered by cannon shot."

== See also ==
- Battle of Grand Port
