= French frigate Caroline =

French sailing frigate

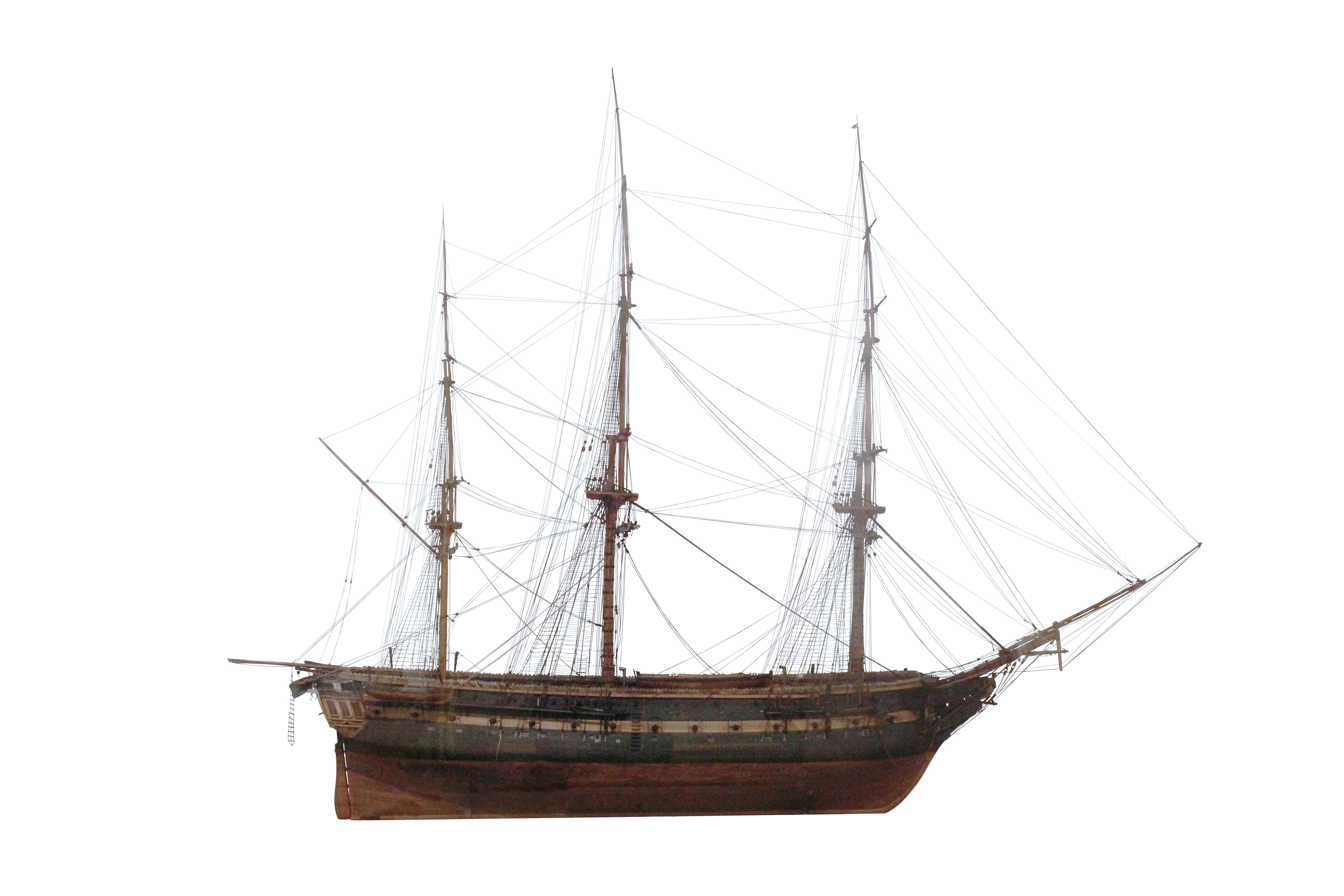
- Hortense, sister-ship of Caroline

History

France
- Name: Caroline
- Namesake: Caroline Bonaparte
- Ordered: 24 April 1804
- Builder: Antwerp shipyard (Constructeur: Anne-Jean-Louis Leharivel-Durocher) to plans by Sané
- Laid down: May 1804
- Launched: 15 August 1806
- Captured: 21 September 1809

United Kingdom
- Name: Bourbonaise
- Acquired: 21 September 1809
- Fate: Sold in 1817

General characteristics
- Displacement: 1,390 tons (French)
- Tons burthen: 1,078 10/94 (bm)
- Length: 151 ft 6 in (46.18 m) (overall); 127 ft 4 7/8 in (38.833 m) (keel)
- Beam: 39 ft 10 5/8 in (12.157 m)
- Depth of hold: 12 ft 2 in (3.71 m)
- Complement: French service: 360; British service: 300 (later 315)
- Armament: At capture; UD: 28 × long 18-pounder guns; Spar deck: 10 × long 8-pounder guns + 8 × 36-pounder carronades; British service; UD: 28 × 18-pounder guns; QD: 14 × 32-pounder carronades; Fc: 2 × 9-pounder guns + 2 × 32-pounder carronades

Caroline was a 40-gun Hortense-class frigate of the French Navy, launched in 1806. She captured several small British vessels in 1807, including a 14-gun privateer. She was ordered to the Indian Ocean in 1808 for commerce raiding, arriving in 1809. During the subsequent Mauritius campaign, Caroline captured two East Indiamen and their valuable cargoes of trade goods in the action of 31 May 1809.

The British captured Caroline at Île Bourbon during the Raid on Saint Paul in September 1809, renaming her HMS Bourbonaise as they already had a ship named Caroline in service. Bourbonaise sailed back to Plymouth where she was held in ordinary until 1816, when she was sold for breaking up.

== Service history ==
=== Actions in 1807 ===
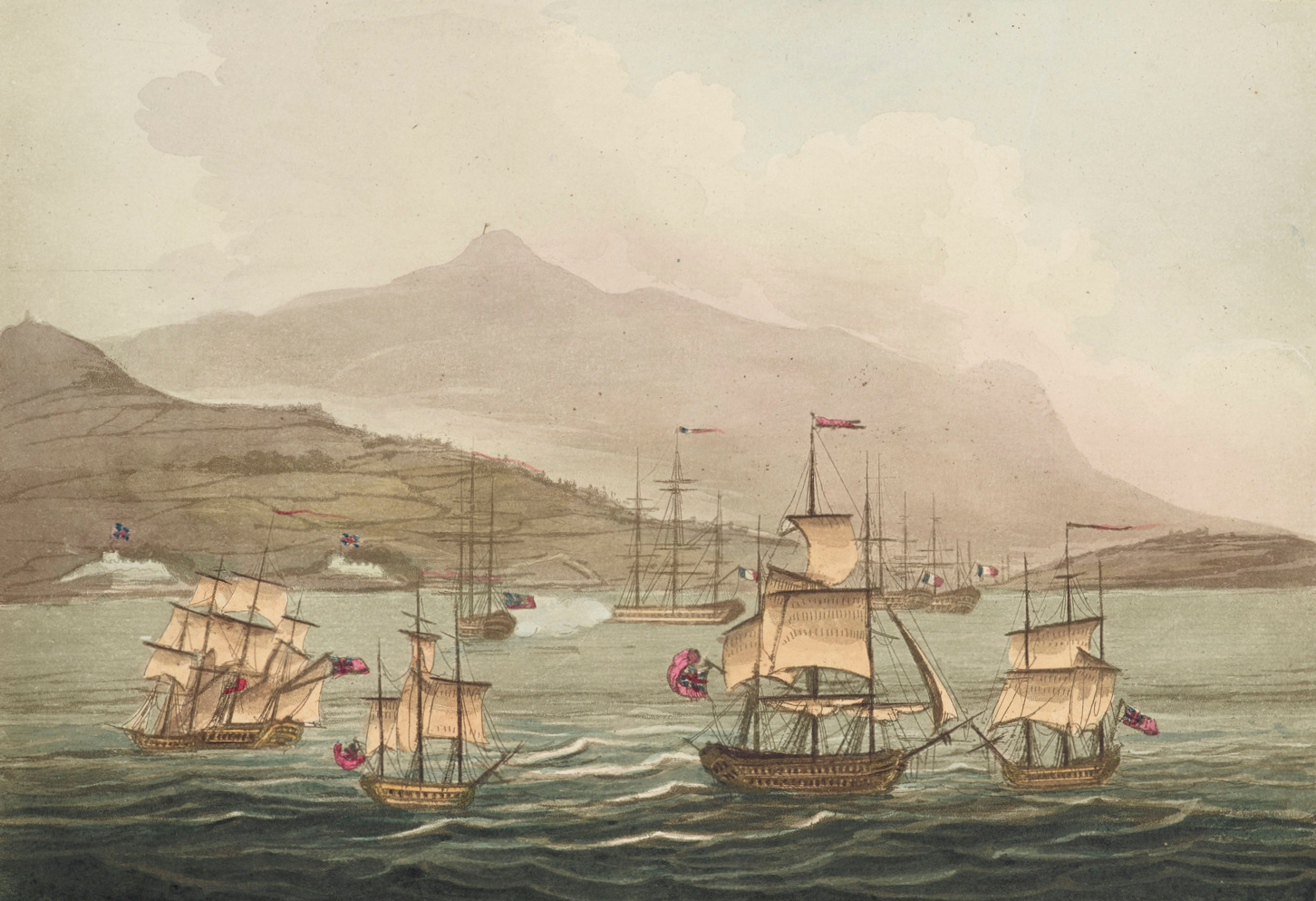
The raid on Saint-Paul, with HMS Sirius raking Caroline

On 30 November 1807 Caroline captured Charlotte, which Caroline set afire and sank. A week later, on 6 December, Caroline captured the privateer Caesar, which she also set on fire and sank. Caesar was a brig of 217 tons (bm), armed with fourteen 6-pounders and two 18-pounder carronades. Her master, Robert Harrison, had received his letter of marque on 1 January 1807.

=== Indian Ocean mission and capture ===
On 12 November 1808, the French authorities sent four new 40-gun frigates to the Indian Ocean, one of them Caroline, under the command of Captain Jean-Baptiste Billard. Caroline sailed from Vlissingen in the Netherlands. Caroline initially patrolled with Manche, Captain Breton, and Iéna, under capitaine de vaisseau Billard. Manche was another of the four; she had sailed from Cherbourg.

Caroline captured several ships, notably two East Indiamen Streatham and Europa on 31 May 1809, before returning to Saint-Paul. A third East Indiaman, Lord Keith, escaped. Prize crews took Streatham and Europa to Réunion, where the British recaptured them on 21 September.

While Billard was suffering from very serious illness, Caroline was under the command of his first mate lieutenant de vaisseau Feretier. He was Caroline's commander on 21 September when HMS Sirius and HMS Raisonnable captured her during the British Raid on Saint-Paul.

=== HMS Bourbonaise ===
She was taken into British service as HMS Bourbonaise, as there was already a HMS Caroline in service.

Bourbonnaise was commissioned under Captain Robert Corbett shortly after her capture. He sailed her to Plymouth, where she arrived 16 February 1810. The Admiralty paid her off and laid her up in ordinary. She never went to sea again.

== Fate ==
The Admiralty attempted to auction Bourbonaise at Plymouth on 18 September 1816 at £2500, but bidding stopped at £2000. She was broken up in April 1817.
