= Josias Rowley =

Royal Navy Admiral and politician (1765-1842)

Admiral Sir Josias Rowley Bt GCB GCMG
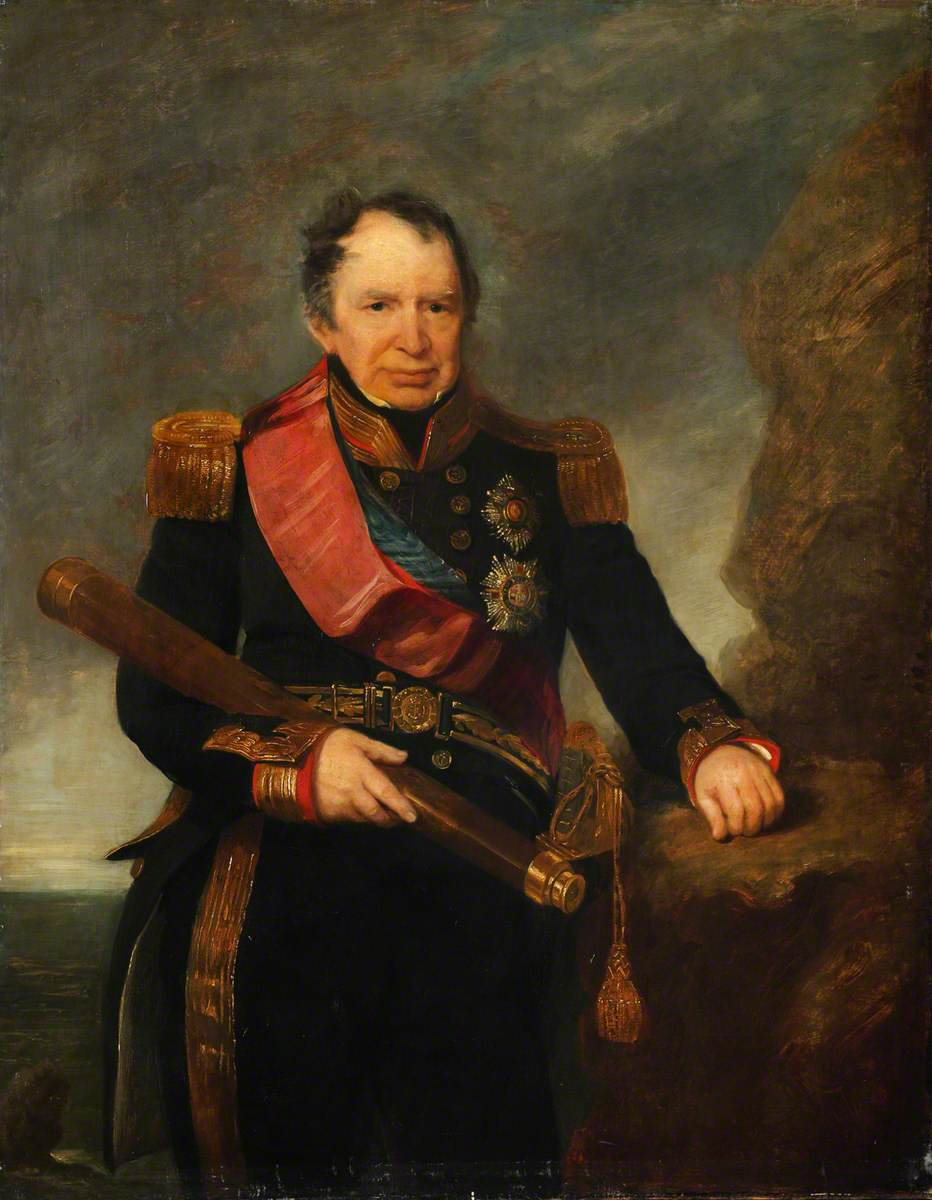
- Portrait by Andrew Morton, 1832–1833
- Born: 1765; Ireland
- Died: 10 January 1842 (aged 76–77); Drumsna, Co.Leitrim, Ireland
- Military career
- Allegiance: Great Britain; United Kingdom
- Branch: Royal Navy
- Service years: 1778–1842
- Rank: Admiral
- Commands: HMS Lark; HMS Braave; HMS Impérieuse; HMS Raisonnable; HMS Boadicea; HMS America; Cape of Good Hope Station; Cork Station; Mediterranean Fleet
- Conflicts: Napoleonic Wars
- Awards: Knight Grand Cross of the Order of the Bath; Knight Grand Cross of the Order of St Michael and St George; Knight of the Military Order of Maria Theresa

Admiral Sir Josias Rowley, 1st Baronet, GCB, GCMG (1765 – 10 January 1842) was a Royal Navy officer and politician who served in the French Revolutionary and Napoleonic Wars.

== Birth and family ==
Rowley was born in 1765 the second son of Clotworthy Rowley and Letitia (née Campbell), of Mountcampbell, Drumsna, County Leitrim, in the West of Ireland. His father was a Barrister and MP for Downpatrick in the Irish Parliament. His paternal grandfather was Admiral of the Fleet Sir William Rowley, KCB. He had at least one brother William, MP for Kinsale and Recorder of Kinsale.

== Naval career ==
He joined the Royal Navy in 1778, age 13, on HMS Suffolk in the West Indies, under the command of his uncle, Sir Joshua Rowley.

Promoted to post captain in 1795, age 30, he commanded HMS Braave (40 guns) at the Cape of Good Hope and then HMS Imperieuse (38 guns) in the East Indies. He also commanded HMS Raisonnable (64 guns) and took part in the Battle of Cape Finisterre in 1805. In 1798 he became the Member of the Irish House of Commons for Downpatrick.

In 1808 he became commander-in-chief, Cape of Good Hope Station. In 1809, as commodore of a small squadron off Mauritius, working with the commander of the East India Company troops at Rodrigues, he successfully raided the island of Réunion.

In March 1810 he moved into HMS Boadicea (38 guns) and transported a larger landing party to Réunion and captured the island. Meanwhile, a force led by Captain Samuel Pym RN was being out-flanked by French frigates attacking Grand Port, Mauritius. HMS Africaine was captured by the French frigates Iphigénie and Astrée in the engagement. Rowley then re-captured Africaine the same day. Vice-Admiral Albemarle Bertie arrived on 29 November and took the surrender of Mauritius on 3 December 1810.

Rowley was then given command of HMS America (74 guns) in the Mediterranean. He was created a baronet in December 1813, promoted rear-admiral in 1814 and appointed KCB in 1815.

In the summer of 1815, age 50, with his flagship Impregnable (98 guns), under Lord Exmouth he sailed once more to the Mediterranean. In 1818 he was appointed commander-in-chief on the Cork Station. In 1821 he became MP for Kinsale, County Cork. Promoted to vice-admiral in 1825, he was made commander-in-chief, Mediterranean Fleet in 1833.

== Death at home ==
He died on 10 January 1842, about age 76, in the Mount Campbell family estate at Drumsna in County Leitrim. He was buried and commemorated at the nearby Annaduff Parish Church. He was unmarried, without heir to his titles. He was survived by his younger brothers Vice Admiral Samuel Rowley (also commemorated within Annaduff Parish Church) and The Reverend John Rowley, incumbent rector at Virginia in County Cavan. The eldest brother William, Recorder of Kinsale, had died in 1812.

== In literature ==
The 1809-1810 campaign was used by author Patrick O'Brian as the setting for the fourth in the series of Aubrey–Maturin series books, The Mauritius Command. The fictional Captain Jack Aubrey takes the place of Rowley in the novel.

== See also ==
- O'Byrne, William Richard (1849). "Rowley, Samuel Campbell#cite note-Josias Rowley-1" . A Naval Biographical Dictionary . John Murray – via Wikisource.

== Bibliography ==
- Josias Rowley's service record and Last Will and Testament are held in the British National Archives
- Leigh Rayment's list of baronets
- Leigh Rayment's Historical List of MPs

Parliament of Ireland
Preceded by Jonathan Chetwood; Clotworthy Rowley	Member of Parliament for Downpatrick; 1798 – 1801; With: Clotworthy Rowley	Succeeded by Parliament of the United Kingdom
Parliament of the United Kingdom
Preceded by George Coussmaker	Member of Parliament for Kinsale; 1821 – 1826	Succeeded by John Russell
Military offices
Preceded by Charles Stirling	Commander-in-Chief, Cape of Good Hope Station; 1808	Succeeded by Sir Albemarle Bertie
Preceded by Benjamin Hallowell	Commander-in-Chief, Cork Station; 1818–1821	Succeeded by Lord Colville
Preceded by Sir Pulteney Malcolm	Commander-in-Chief, Mediterranean Fleet; 1833–1837	Succeeded by Sir Robert Stopford
Baronetage of the United Kingdom
New creation	Baronet (of the Navy); 1813 – 1842	Extinct
Preceded by Radcliffe baronets	Rowley baronets of the Navy; 2 November 1813	Succeeded by Hewett baronets
