= Ceylon (1803 ship) =

East Indiaman

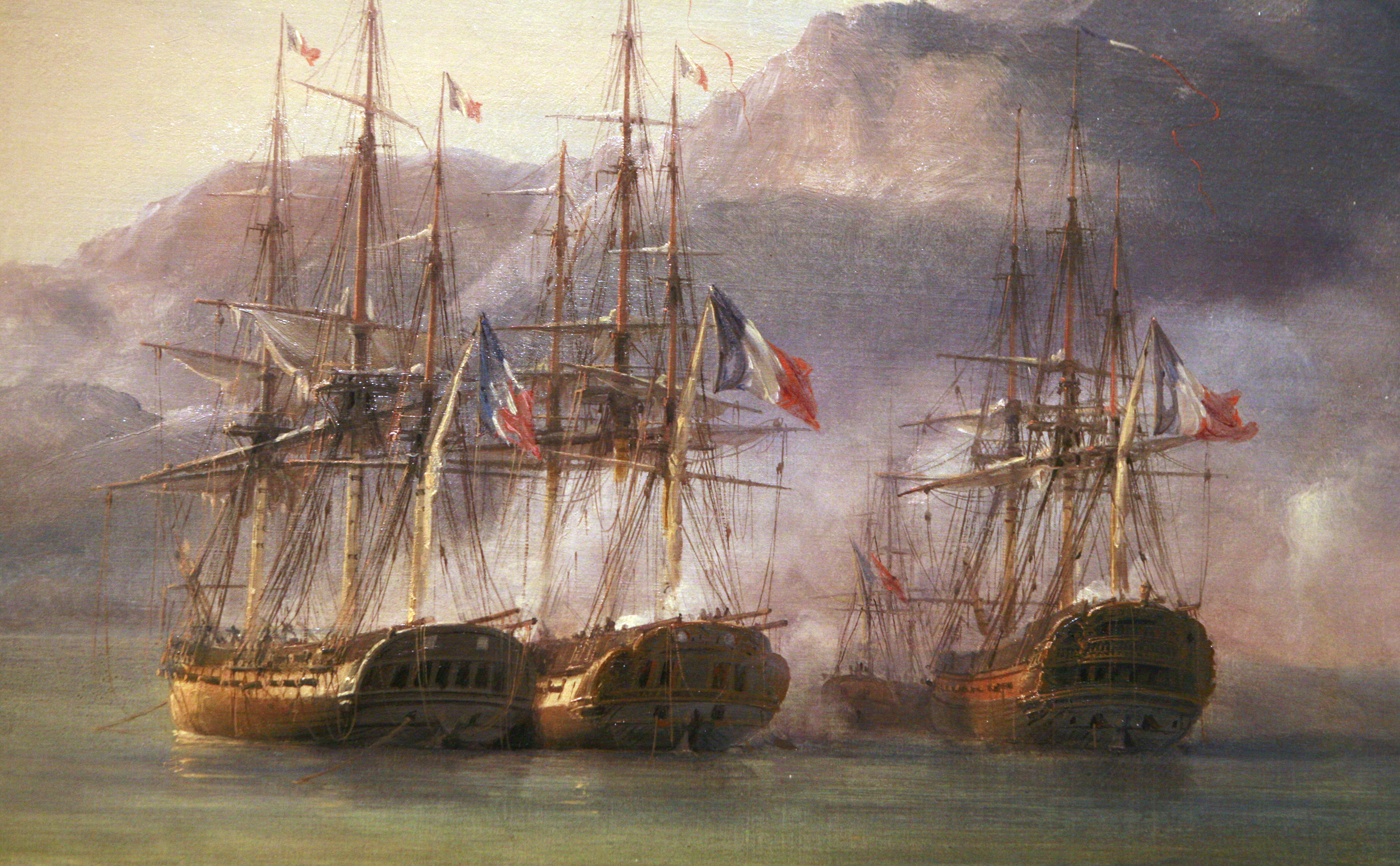
- Ceylon (right), renamed Ceylan, at the Battle of Grand Port

History

British East India Company
- Name: Ceylon
- Owner: Voyages 1-3:John St Barbe; Voyage 4: Kennard Smith
- Operator: East India Company
- Route: England-India
- Builder: Pitcher, Northfleet
- Laid down: 1802
- Launched: April 1803
- Fate: Captured on 3 July 1810

France
- Name: Ceylan
- Acquired: July 1810 by capture
- Captured: December 1810

British East India Company United Kingdom
- Name: Ceylon
- Owner: Kennard Smith
- Operator: East India Company, then new owners
- Route: England-India
- Acquired: December 1810 by recapture
- Fate: Sold 1815

General characteristics
- Type: East Indiaman
- Tons burthen: 81826/94, or 843, or 867
- Length: 148 ft 8 1/2 in (45.3 m) (overall); 116 ft 0 in (35.4 m) (keel)
- Beam: 36 ft 5 in (11.1 m)
- Depth of hold: 14 ft 9 in (4.5 m)
- Propulsion: sail
- Crew: 1803: 90; 1810:110
- Armament: Pierced for 34 guns; 1803: 26 × 18-pounder guns; 1810: 20 × 18-pounder guns + 6 × 18-pounder carronades; 1815: 20 × 18-pounder carronades

Ceylon was an East Indiaman launched in 1803. She performed four voyages for the British East India Company (EIC). On her fourth voyage the French captured her in the action of 3 July 1810; she then took part in the Battle of Grand Port. The British recaptured her at the invasion of Île de France (now Mauritius). She completed her fourth voyage and her owners then sold her. She became a transport until her owners sold her in 1815 to new foreign owners.

== Career ==
=== EIC Voyage #1 (1803-04) ===
Captain Thomas Hudson left The Downs on 27 April 1803, bound for Bombay, Bengal, and Madras. He sailed under a letter of marque issued on 27 June 1803, i.e., after he had left.

Ceylon reached Bombay on 24 August, Tellicherry on 27 September, and Anjengo on 5 October, before arriving at Diamond Harbour on 18 November. Homeward bound, she was at Saugor on 24 December, Vizagapatam on 27 January 1804, Madras on 21 February, and St Helena on 28 June.

Ceylon travelled from St Helena in convoy with the East Indiamen City of London, Prince of Wales, Calcutta, and Wyndham, two vessels from the South Seas, Lively and Vulture, and Rolla, which had transported convicts to New South Wales. Their escort was HMS Courageaux. On the way the convoy ran into severe weather with the result that Prince of Wales foundered with the loss of all on board.

Ceylon arrived at Northfleet on 15 October.

=== EIC Voyage #2 (1805-06) ===
Captain Thomas Hudson left Portsmouth on 8 March 1805, again bound for Madras, Bengal and Bombay.Ceylon arrived at Madras on 17 July, and reached Diamond Harbour on 10 August. Homeward bound, she was at Saugor on 7 November, Colombo on 20 December, Bombay on 19 January 1806, Tellicherry on 3 March, Quilon on 5 March, and Anjengo on 9 March. She reached St Helena on 14 May and arrived at Long reach on 22 July.

=== EIC Voyage #3 (1807-09) ===
Captain Thomas Hudson left Portsmouth on 4 March 1807, bound for Madras, Bengal, and Penang. Ceylon reached Madras on 9 September and Diamond Harbour on 3 October. She was at Saugor on 22 November and arrived at Penang on 15 December. She was again at Saugor on 8 February 1808, and at Kidderpore on 30 March. She was at Saugor again on 11 May, but now homeward bound, she reached Madras on 25 July.

In November Ceylon was in convoy with some eight other Indiamen when she got caught in a hurricane. On this voyage, she had lost 46 men of the 110 she had set out with: 41 pressed by various ships of the Royal Navy, six dead of disease, six deserted, two drowned in Diamond Harbour, and one who had joined the Army. Hudson, who by this time knew he was dying of "Bengal Fever", had made up his numbers with lascars, and some Danes, however the replacements were of a lower quality than the men lost, especially those the Navy had pressed. On 21 November Ceylon was on her beam ends, almost capsizing; fortunately the weather temporarily moderated and she righted herself. As the weather worsened again, the foretopmast broke, but could not be cleared. Ceylon started to take on water and the pumps could not keep up. When Hudson went below, he found that the lascars and Danes were paralyzed by fear or fatalism and would not man the pumps. The men passengers, Army officers and invalided soldiers, manned the pumps while the functioning crew members threw guns overboard. Towards 6p.m. on 23 November the weather moderated and Ceylon's pumps were able to start reducing the water in the ship. At some point that evening one of the passengers, the wife of an army officer, gave birth. As Ceylon limped towards Cape Town a fever passed through the vessel killing a baby born on 11 November, five soldiers, and three crewmen.

Ceylon reached the Cape on 19 January 1809. There two of her passengers married. She arrived at St Helena on 7 March. On 17 March, a few days after leaving St Helena, Hudson died while Ceylon was at sea. She arrived at the Downs on 19 May.

=== EIC Voyage #4 (1810-11) ===
Captain Henry Meriton left Portsmouth on 14 March 1810, bound for Madras and Bengal. Ceylon left the Cape on 13 June. He too sailed under a letter of marque, his being issued on 27 January 1810.

In July, she was sailing off Comoros Islands in company with Windham and Astell. The convoy encountered a French frigate squadron under Guy-Victor Duperré, leading to the action of 3 July 1810, where Minerve captured her. The French also captured Windham, while Astell managed to escape. The EIC put a value of £15,995 on its cargo aboard Ceylon.

Lieutenant Vincent Moulac took command of Ceylon, renamed Ceylan, and the frigate squadron returned to Île de France with its prizes. Arriving, the squadron met with a British frigate squadron, leading to the Battle of Grand Port, where the British briefly recaptured Windham before the French retook her; Ceylan helped support the French squadron, which destroyed three of the British frigates, the last one surrendering when a second French frigate squadron come as reinforcements cut off the British frigate's retreat.

From September 1810, her captors used Ceylon as a prison ship. The British recaptured her on 3 December in the invasion of Isle de France. After the British recaptured her, they sent her on her voyage. At this point she came under the command of John Stewart.

Ceylon left Port Louis on 4 April 1811. She reached St Helena on 21 May, and arrived at The Downs on 8 August.

== Fate ==
On her return to Britain in 1811, her owners sold her. Her new owners used her as a transport until 1815. Ceylon enters the Register of Shipping for 1813 in the supplemental pages with Morse, master, and Carling & Co. as owner. Her trade was London-based transport. The Register of Shipping for 1815 lists her master as Hall. The other information is unchanged.

Carling & Co.then sold her to foreign buyers and cancelled her registration on 18 September 1815.
