= French corvette Revenant =

Revenant
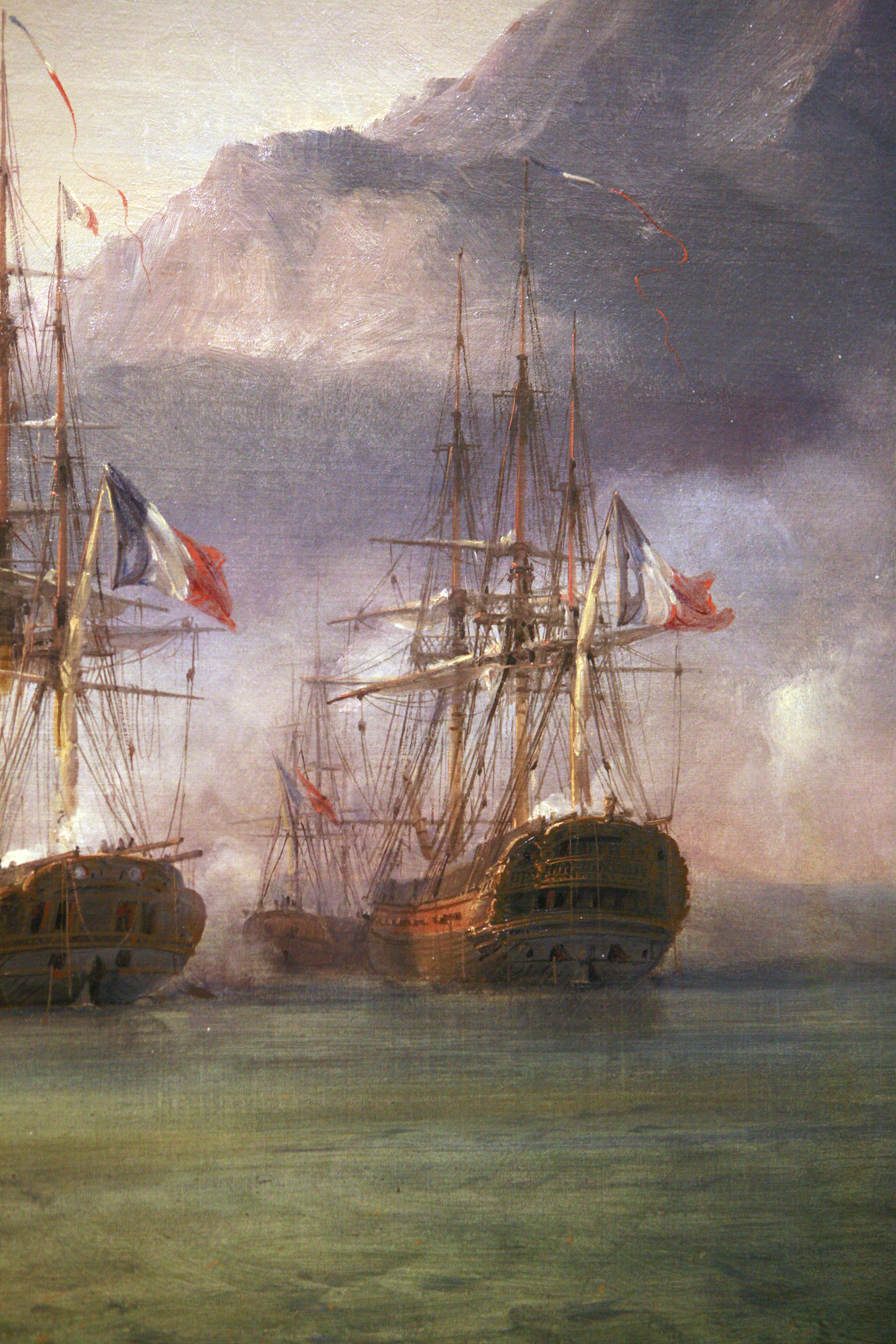
- Detail of Combat de Grand Port, by Pierre Julien Gilbert, Musée national de la marine. Victor (ex-Revenant) is visible in the background.

History

France
- Name: Revenant
- Namesake: Revenant (French: "ghost")
- Builder: Saint-Malo
- Launched: 1807
- Acquired: July 1808 by French Navy
- Renamed: Iéna September 1808
- Fate: Captured on 8 October 1808

United Kingdom
- Name: Victor
- Acquired: 8 October 1808
- Captured: 2 November 1809

France
- Name: Victor
- Acquired: 2 November 1809 by capture
- Captured: 3 December 1810
- Fate: Broken up

General characteristics
- Type: Corvette
- Displacement: 300 tons (French)
- Tons burthen: c.400
- Length: 36 meters
- Beam: 9 meters
- Sail plan: Full-rigged ship
- Speed: up to 12 knots
- Armament: French service: 14 × 32-pounder carronades + 6 × 8-pounder long guns; British service: 16 × 32-pounder carronades + 2 × 6-pounder bow chaser long guns

Revenant was a 20-gun privateer corvette, launched in 1807, and designed by Robert Surcouf for commerce raiding. The French Navy later requisitioned her and renamed her Iéna, after Napoleon's then-recent victory at the Battle of Jena–Auerstedt. The British captured her in 1808 and she served in the Royal Navy as HMS Victor. The French Navy recaptured her in 1809, taking her back into service under the new name. The British again captured her when they took Isle de France (now Mauritius) in December 1810. They did not restore her to service, and she was subsequently broken up.

== Career ==
Her coppered hull allowed her to sail at up to 12 knots. Her cost was 277,761 francs-or. One of her owners was the banker Jacques Récamier.

=== Indian ocean cruises (1807 - 1808) ===
In February 1807, Surcouf enlisted Potier as first officer on his new privateer Revenant. Revenant then departed from Saint-Malo on 2 March, and sailed for Isle de France. Revenant arrived there on 10 June, along with several prizes she had taken during her journey. She cruised the Bay of Bengal from September to 31 January 1808 under Surcouf, capturing the rice ships Trafalgar, Mangles, Admiral Alpin, Susannah Hunter, Success, Fortune, New Endeavour, Colonel Macauley, William Burroughs, Oriente and Jean Labdam. Trafalgar, of about 800 tons (bm), was a copper-sheathed three-master, carrying 10,000 sacks of rice from Bengal. Maingless (Mangles) was also a copper-sheathed three-master, in this case carrying 8,000 sacks of rice from Bengal, but also books, mirrors, and furniture. Lastly, Suzanne, of 400 tons (bm), copper-sheathed three-master, was carrying rice and sailcloth. They had been captured on 11, 18, and 25 November, and arrived at Port-Louis on 2 and 16 December.

After Revenant returned to Port-Louis from her first campaign Surcouf gave Potier command of the ship on 2 April.

In late April, as Revenant was completing her preparations and plotting her route, a prize taken by the privateer Adèle gave news of the new war between France and Portugal; Adèle also brought intelligence about the Conceçáo-de-Santo-Antonio, a 64-gun ship of the line armed en flûte, which was in Goa preparatory to sailing for Rio de Janeiro and Lisbon. Surcouf sent Portier to intercept, and Revenant departed Port-Louis on 30 April. She arrived in her patrol zone on 17 May and sighted her prey on the 24th. Revenant captured Conceçáo-de-Santo-Antonio after a one-hour battle. Potier gave Conceçáo a prize crew under First Lieutenant Fonroc, and returned to Mauritius one month later with his prize.

Surcouf then planned to send Revenant back to France en aventurier with colonial goods.

=== French naval service ===
General Charles Decaen, governor of Isle de France, requisitioned Revenant on 4 July. The government renamed her Iéna, and gave command of her to Lieutenant Nicolas Morice, with Lieutenant de vaisseau Albin Roussin as second officer. Surcouf had an altercation with Decaen but had to accept the requisitioning of his ship. Surcouf eventually purchased Sémillante, which he renamed Charles, to return to France with his goods.

=== Capture by the Royal Navy ===
Iéna set sail to cruise the Persian Gulf and Bay of Bengal. On 8 October 1808, off the Sandheads near the mouth of the Ganges river, she was chased by the 44-gun HMS Modeste, under Captain George Elliot, which caught the Iéna after 9 hours. A night battle followed at musket range; after two and a half hours, Iéna was crippled, dismasted and leaking water, and struck her colours. Iéna had no casualties, while Modeste had her master killed and a seaman wounded. The Royal Navy commissioned Iéna as the 18-gun ship sloop HMS Victor, initially under Commander Thomas Grout and subsequently under Captain Edward Stopford.

On 2 May 1809, under Stopford's command, she departed from the Sandheads with a convoy of five Indiamen and several smaller vessels. On 24 May a storm split the convoy and Victor and the small ships separately lost touch with the Indiamen. Two of the Indiamen, Monarch and Earl Spencer, deviated to Penang with Earl Spencer accompanying Monarch, which had developed a bad leak and needed to reach a port to repair. The three remaining Indiamen, Streatham, Europe, and Lord Keith continued on their way while hoping to meet up with Victor. They did not and the French frigate Caroline captured Streatham and Europe in the action of 31 May 1809; Lord Keith escaped.

=== Recapture by the French Navy ===
On 2 November 1809, Victor, still under Stopford's command, encountered the 44-gun frigate Bellone, under Guy-Victor Duperré; Victor struck after a long chase and a brief but spirited resistance that cost her two men wounded. Bellone took her to Isle de France, where she was repaired and recommissioned as Victor in the French Navy, under Lieutenant Nicolas Morice.

On 21 February, she sailed for a cruise in the Indian Ocean and the Mozambique Channel in a squadron comprised Bellone and Minerve under Pierre Bouvet. There, she took part in the action of 3 July 1810, contributing to the capture of the East Indiamen Windham and Ceylon.

Upon their return to Île de France, the French squadron encountered a British frigate squadron attempting to seize the island. In the ensuing Battle of Grand Port, Victor was used as a support ship, behind the French line of battle, as her armament was weaker than that of the more powerful frigates.

On 17–18 September 1810, along with Vénus, she captured the 40-gun HMS Ceylon. Vénus and Ceylon were damaged in the battle, and the next day a British squadron composed of HMS Boadicea, HMS Otter, and the brig HMS Staunch captured Vénus and Ceylon; Victor managed to escape.

=== Fate ===
The British recaptured Victor when Isle de France fell on 3 December 1810. Most sources state that she was not restored to service but instead was broken up, though one source claims that Royal Navy recommissioned her in October 1811, and she was then paid off at Portsmouth in August 1814.

== In art ==
- Gustave Alaux (1887 - 1965), peintre de la Marine, painted a full portrait of Revenant, set at Isle de France in 1808.
- Victor appears in the background of the Combat de Grand Port, by Pierre Julien Gilbert, on display at the Musée national de la marine. She is barely visible behind a cloud of smoke, between Minerve and Ceylon.
