= French frigate Minerve (1809) =

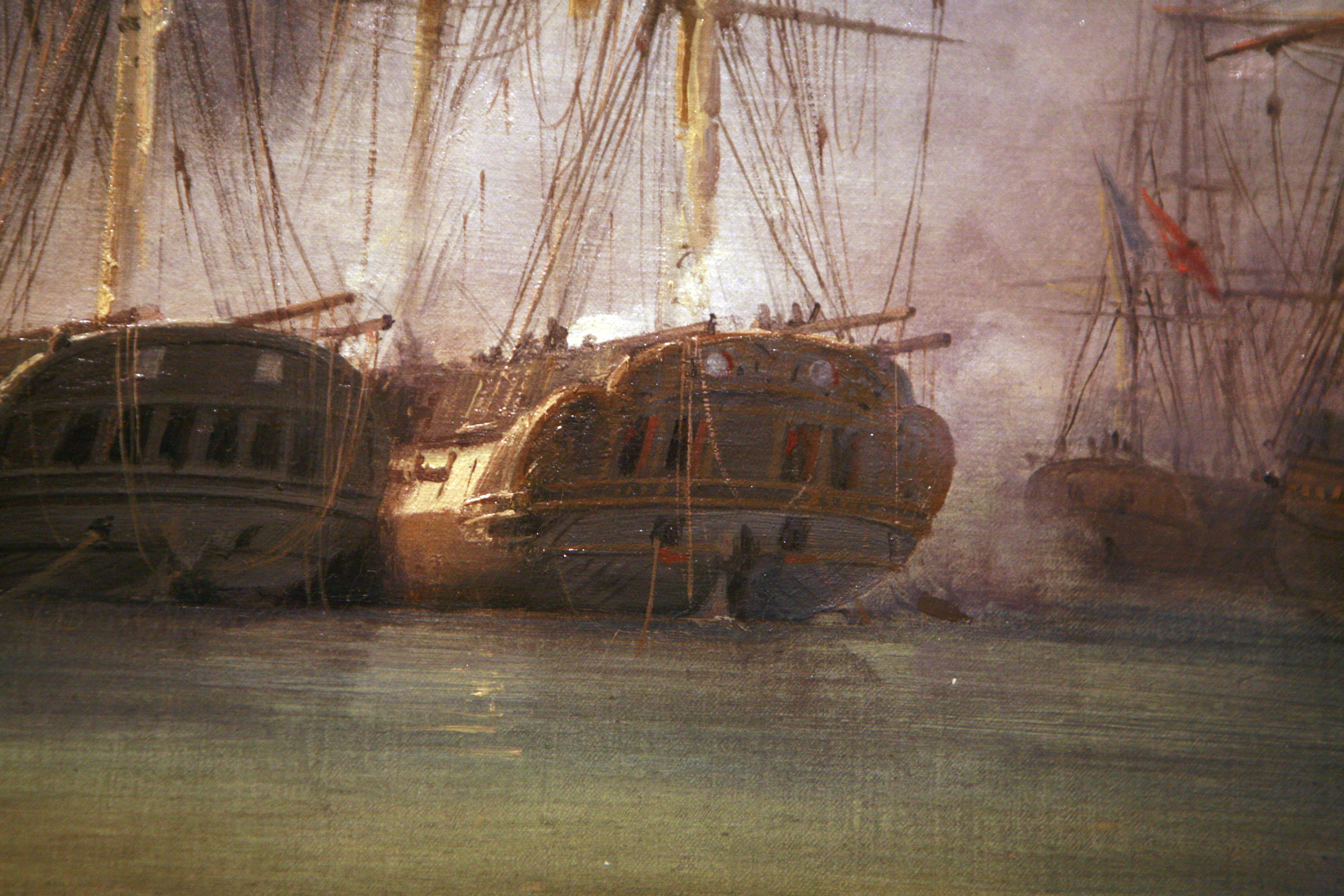
- Minerve (centre) at the Battle of Grand Port.

History

Portugal
- Name: Nossa Senhora da Vitória, a Minerva; Minerva
- Namesake: Our Lady of Victory and Minerva
- Builder: Lisbon
- Laid down: 1787
- Launched: 19 July 1788
- Captured: 23 November 1809

France
- Name: Minerve
- Acquired: 22 November 1809
- Captured: 3 December 1810 by the Royal Navy
- Fate: Broken up

General characteristics
- Tons burthen: 1400 tons
- Length: 156 feet 9 inches (47.78 m).
- Beam: 58 feet (18 m), or 38 feet (12 m).
- Complement: 349 men
- Armament: 48 guns, 18-pounder main battery

The French frigate Minerve was originally launched in 1788 for the Portuguese Navy, where she served under the dual names of Nossa Senhora da Vitória and Minerva. The French Navy captured and renamed her in November 1809, after which she played a notable role in the Indian Ocean campaign of 1809-1811, participating in the defeat of a Royal Navy frigate squadron at the Battle of Grand Port, but at the surrender of Mauritius in December 1810, the ship was handed over to the British, and seems to have been broken up soon afterwards.

== Design and construction ==
The Nossa Senhora da Vitória was built at Lisbon by the shipbuilder Torcato Jose Clavina, and launched on 18 July 1788, or according to some other sources, 19 July in the same year.

A standard modern work on the Portuguese navy of this period states the ship's hull length at 156 feet 9 inches, and her beam (the breadth of the hull) at a very wide 58 feet. Conversely, an equivalent work quoting French sources states her length at 147 pieds du roi and 1 pouce, and her beam at 35 pieds 8 pouces, corresponding to 47.78 m × 11.57 m or 156 ft 9 in by 38 ft English measure. The reason for the discrepancy in beam measurement is not clear, though it is possible that it represents miscopying of a shared source.

Pierre Bouvet, who commanded the Minerve in French service, wrote that the ship seemed large enough to accommodate a main armament of 24-pounder long guns, although details of her hull construction indicated that in practice she had never carried anything heavier than 18-pounder long guns. The armament allocated at the time of the ship's construction is said to have been eleven pairs of 18-pounders, eleven pairs of 9-pounders, and four pairs of 6-pounders, numbers more suited for a small two-decker with two full batteries of guns than a true frigate, but by the time of her capture by the French in 1809, her armament had assumed a more conventional frigate configuration, with the main gundeck mounting fourteen pairs of 18-pounders and one pair of carronades, supported by nine pairs of lighter guns on the open deck of the forecastle and quarterdeck, a mix of 24-pounder carronades and long 9-pounders.

After her capture by the French, Bouvet re-armed the ship, replacing her Portuguese 18-pounders with English cannon of the same calibre which had previously formed the main battery of the frigate La Canonnière (ex-HMS Minerve), and in the absence of sufficient numbers of carronades, armed her forecastle and quarterdeck with 18-pounder short guns taken from the captured East Indiaman Warren Hastings. This also appealed to Bouvet as it simplified the ammunition supply by making all the cannon aboard a ship the same calibre (a practice that would be widely adopted in subsequent decades), and he also borrowed several practices from the opposing Royal Navy, including the use of a barricade of tightly bundled hammocks to protect the quarterdeck from musketry and grapeshot during battle.

The Portuguese had originally allocated the frigate a crew of around 349 men, but due to the limited manpower resources available in the Indian Ocean, her total crew in French service was perhaps below 250 men, and a significant proportion of them were Portuguese defectors.

== Portuguese Navy career ==
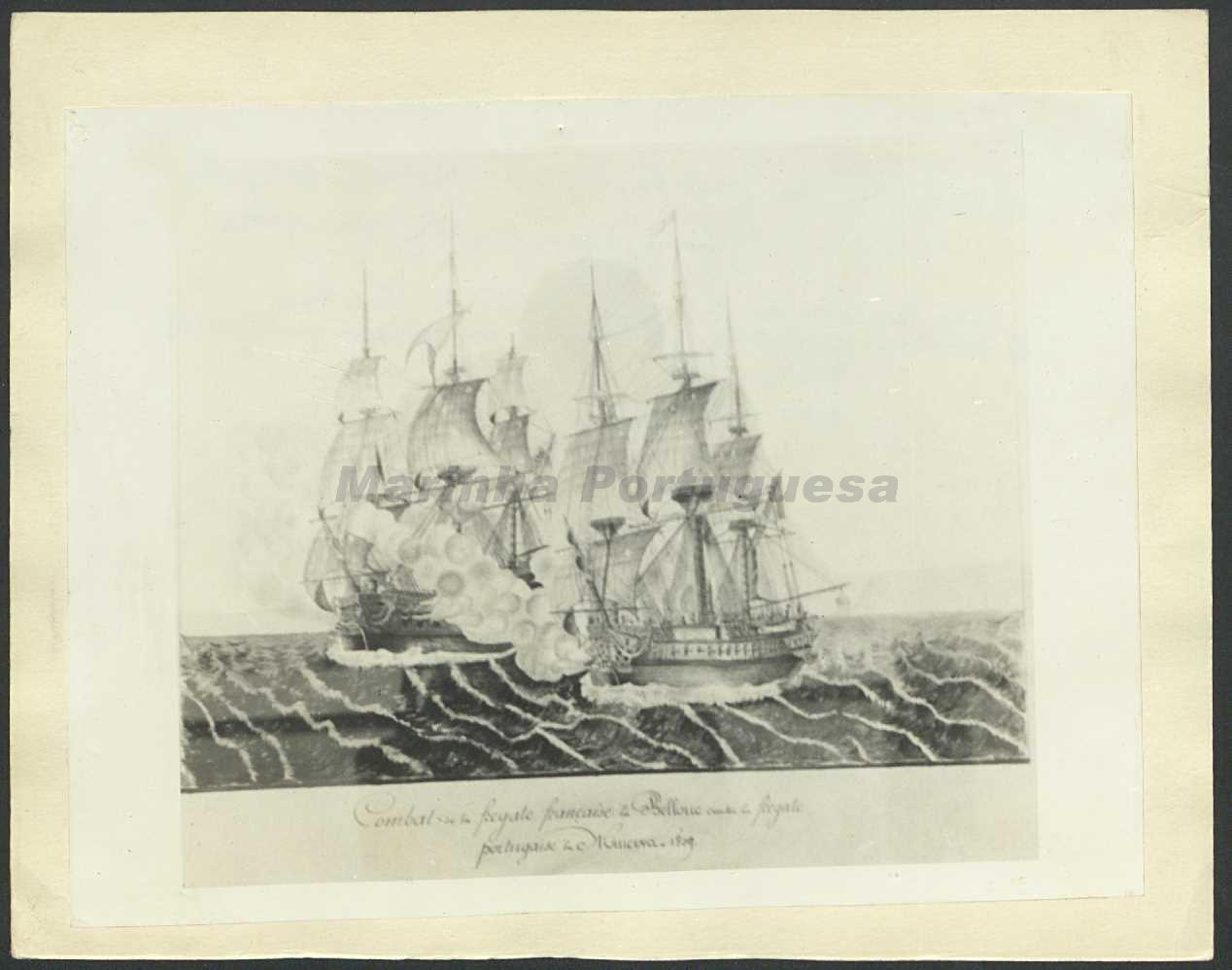
Combat between the Portuguese frigate Minerva and the French frigate Bellone on 22 November 1809.

In Portuguese service, the frigate was known as both Nossa Senhora da Vitória and Minerva, with one online source suggesting that this reflected a change of name around 1792. In 1807, along with the bulk of the Portuguese Navy, she participated in the transfer of the Portuguese Court to Brazil. In June 1809 Minerva departed from Brazil, under Captain Pinto, and on 22 November 1809 she encountered the French frigate Bellone, under Captain Duperré.

Duperré's report states that he had come into gunnery range by about 3 o' clock and opened fire, but dogged sailing by the Portuguese frigate kept him at a distance and prevented him from keeping up a sustained fire, and after two hours, he ordered his gunners to cease fire, electing to manoeuvre his faster-sailing frigate to gain the advantage of the weather gauge. Although he initially hoped to fight a night action, calm weather meant that he was unable to close the range with Minerva until 9 o' clock the next morning, 23 November 1809. The Minerva continued to manouvre, and although some sources claim that Bellone was able to deliver a raking broadside, it was not until some time after quarter past nine that the French frigate was able to secure a favourable position, at pistol-shot range off the port quarter of her Portuguese opponent's stern. Bellone then simply cannonaded Minerva for around one hour and forty-five minutes, targeting her sails and rigging, until the Portuguese frigate surrendered.

== French service as Minerve ==
Duperré, hindered by the damage Bellone had sustained, the reduction and dispersion of his crew over his prizes, and the 500 prisoners he had aboard, decided to return to Île de France, where he arrived on 2 January 1810, accompanied by the Victor, a former privateer corvette which Bellone had recaptured from the Royal Navy, and the frigate Manche, which they had met en route.

At Île de France the French repaired the captured Portuguese frigate and commissioned her as Minerve, appointing Pierre Bouvet as her captain. As noted above, Bouvet re-armed her with captured English guns. To form the core of a new French crew, Bouvet was allowed to bring with him half the seamen from his former command, the brig-rigged corvette Entreprenant, along with the men of the captured schooner Mouche n° 6, who he had repatriated from the Philippines, augmented by and a few veteran marine artillerymen from the crew of the frigate La Canonnière; but this probably did not amount to more than 75-100 French seamen at most - the Entreprenant had a notional strength of 110 men, so presumably around fifty sailors were carried over from her, while the maximum crew assigned for a Mouche-class schooner was 25 men. To make up the numbers, he recruited around a hundred and fifty of the frigate's former Portuguese crew, and a number of young local volunteers, though even with these reinforcements, the crew was perhaps only in the region of 200-250 men.

=== Fight with the East India Convoy ===
Minerve then sailed with Bellone and the smaller Victor on 14 March 1810, to patrol in the waters between Mauritius and Africa astride the main sea-lanes Europe and the East Indies. After failing to encounter any enemy ships in the open ocean east of Madagascar, they moved into the Mozambique Channel, south of the Comoros Islands between Madagascar and the African mainland, and at daybreak on 3 July 1810, the lookouts aboard Minerve sighted three sails on the horizon, and the frigate moved to investigate.

The ships proved to be the East Indiamen Windham, Ceylon and Astell; although they were civilian vessels, they were well-armed with 18-pounder cannon, their captains had stood their ground successfully against French raiders in the past, and their crews were now reinforced by large numbers of British Army soldiers.

French and English sources give somewhat contradictory versions of the resulting battle, but it in outline, it is clear that Minerve sustained much of the fight before Bellone came into gunnery range, sailing down the British line and engaging the three East Indiamen in turn before manoeuvring around the head of their formation. After turning, however, the Minerve had its main topmast shot away, which also brought down the mizzen topmast. Bellone and Victor took over the battle, while the Minerve cleared away the tangle and eventually returned under its lower sails to resume the fight against Ceylon, which surrendered without further resistance, while the dismasted Windham surrendered to Bellone, and the Astell made its escape.

A part of Minerve's crew were assigned to man the captured Ceylon, led by Enseigne de vaisseau Vincent Moulac. The French squadron and the two captured East Indiamen sailed to Anjouan, the nearest island in the Comoros archipelago, where they could repair their shattered masts and attend to injured personnel; not until mid-July were the repairs completed and the Minerve and the other ships ready to return to Île de France. Arriving there a month later on 20 August, the Minerve immediately found herself embroiled in the Battle of Grand Port.

=== Battle of Grand Port ===
Approaching the Grand Port anchorage, the squadron found another French-built frigate anchored there under the protection of the heavy guns of the fort on Île de la Passe. Most officers of the squadron believed this ship to be the powerful privateer Charles, which was expected to return to the island after a refit in France.

In reality, the frigate was HMS Nereide, and the British had seized the fort on Île de Passe a week earlier. As Minerve sailed into the anchorage, the 42-pounder cannon of the fort opened fire against her waterline, striking her orlop, and killing and maiming many of the young volunteers who were acting as powder monkeys. Nonetheless, the Minerve was able to sail forward and, according to her captain's memoirs, deliver a raking broadside into the stern of the British frigate, followed by her prize Ceylon and the smaller Victor. Bellone then entered the harbour behind them, though Windham did not risk the passage, and was subsequently recaptured by Royal Navy.

The French anchored their ships in a defensive line, with Minerve at the rear, Ceylon and Bellone ahead of her, and the smaller Victor tucked behind them; another squadron of frigates based on the opposite side of the island was ordered to sail round and try and trap the Royal Navy attacking force. The opposing Royal Navy force, meanwhile, had been reinforced with three other frigates, HMS Sirius, HMS Magicienne, and HMS Iphigenia, and on 23 August, they attacked, sailing boldly into the harbour - the British plan was for HMS Iphigenia to come broadside-to-broadside with Minerve, while HMS Magicienne positioned herself off her bow, to fight both her and the weaker Ceylon, but while Iphigenia reached her position, the Magicienne ran aground with her vulnerable bows pointing towards the French line - the Minerve thus found herself trading broadsides with Iphigenia and simultaneously delivering ranking fire against Magicienne, which answered with her chase guns; nearby, a similar duel evolved between Bellone, HMS Nereide and HMS Sirius. At dusk, however the anchor cables of the French frigates were shot away in close succession, and they drifted forward and ran aground; Minerve ended up behind the Bellone, with only her stern projecting so that the four aft cannon of the main-deck broadside and the corresponding five quarterdeck guns were able to continue firing; Ceylon ran aground behind her in turn, so that only nine of her broadside guns were unmasked.

Bouvet now had to assume overall command of the squadron from the wounded Duperré, and around 8 o' clock that evening, he transferred control of Minerve to his second-in-command Lieutenant de vaisseau Albin Roussin; the gunnery duel continued through the night, and it was Roussin who received the surrender of the shattered HMS Nereide the next morning - later that day, HMS Magicienne, still aground, was set on fire; attempts to refloat HMS Sirius proving futile, she was blown up in turn on the morning of 25 August, leaving only HMS Iphigenia retreating slowly out of the harbour, kedging with her anchors due to wind conditions and the risk of running aground; Bouvet, meanwhile, had moved first to Bellone, apparently taking with him some of the crew from Minerve to pass ammunition and reinforce her gun crews, and then on 26 August to the smaller Victor (the only ship in the French squadron still capable of sailing to confront the retreating Iphigenia, the others having run aground too hard to be refloated mid-battle), and finally the captured HMS Iphigenia, which surrendered on 27 August after the second French frigate squadron appeared to close the exit from the port; as the surrendered ship was relatively undamaged compared with the other frigates from the battle, she was promptly commissioned by the French as La Iphigénie, with Bouvet placed in charge and a large proportion of the French seamen from the Minerve reassigned to crew her.

=== Subsequent role ===
At least one modern source claims that Minerve next sailed to the Philippines, to recover the crew of the schooner Mouche n° 6, which the Spanish had seized at Manila. However, this seems unlikely, as Bouvet's own memoirs make clear that this mission had taken place earlier while he was in command of Entreprenant.

In reality, there is little that evidence Minerve ever left Grand Port. The journal of the French flag officer Guy-Victor Duperré shows that between 17 and 25 October 1810, several contradictory orders were issued in quick succession: Minerve and the other ships of his squadron were first taken out of service to undergo repairs, then ordered to hastily make ready again, before Minerve was specifically assigned to serve as a prison hulk for crewmen from captured enemy ships; then on 27 November she was again repurposed, anchored as a guard ship or floating battery to defend a new harbour boom.

This did not prevent the arrival of a large British invasion force, and on 3 December 1810, the frigate was handed over to the Royal Navy, although her officers and crew were allowed to return to France to continue the fight, along with the rest of the personnel from the naval squadron and defending garrison. In April 1811, a Royal Navy report stated that Minerve would require three months of repair at considerable expense, and though there is no definitive record of her fate, the ship appears to have been broken up shortly thereafter.
