= Euphrates (1803 EIC ship) =

East Indiaman (1803–1813

History

British East India Company
- Name: Euphrates
- Namesake: Euphrates
- Owner: EIC voyage #1:Thomas Hurry; EIC voyage #2:Henry Cooke; EIC voyages #3-5:Andrew Timbrell
- Builder: Francis Hurry & Co., Newcastle-on-Tyne
- Launched: 7 June 1803
- Fate: Wrecked 1 January 1813

General characteristics
- Tons burthen: 590, or 596, or 59650/94, or 632 (bm)
- Length: Overall:127 ft 10 in (39.0 m); Keel:102 ft 2 1/2 in (31.2 m)
- Beam: 33 ft 1 1/2 in (10.1 m)
- Depth of hold: 13 ft 7 in (4.1 m)
- Propulsion: Sail
- Complement: 1803:50; 1805:55
- Armament: 1803:22 × 12-pounder guns + 4 swivel guns; 1805:22 × 12-pounder guns
- Notes: Three decks

Euphrates was launched in 1803 as an East Indiaman. Between 1803 and 1812 she made four voyages to India for the British East India Company (EIC). During these voyages she participated as a transport in two military campaigns, the capture of the Cape of Good Hope and of Mauritius. She was wrecked in 1813 towards the end of the outward leg of a fifth voyage to India.

== Career ==
=== EIC voyage #1 (1803–1805) ===
Captain George Welstead acquired a letter of marque on 2 September 1803. He sailed from Portsmouth on 28 September, bound for Madras and Bengal. Euphrates reached Madras on 20 February 1804, was at Vizagapatam on 20 March, and arrived at Calcutta on 7 April. Homeward bound, she was at Saugor on 1 September, and Madras again on 22 September. She reached St Helena on 31 December, and arrived at Long Reach on 24 March 1805.

There were two incidents of note on this voyage. As Euphrates was sailing up the Hooghli River she grounded. However Welstead was able to get her off. In 1805 Lloyd's of London presented him with a silver tureen as a thanks for his efforts in refloating her.

Then, as Euphrates was coming into London at the end of her voyage, HMS Utile pressed eight of her crew. Utile also lent her eight crew men to work Euphrates into dock.

=== EIC voyage #2 (1805–1807) ===
Captain Philip Herbert acquired a letter of marque on 16 July 1805. Euphrates then sailed for St Helena, Penang, and Bengal. Outward bound, she was part of a fleet of transports and East Indiamen carrying some 5000 soldiers under the command of Major-general Sir David Baird to attack the Dutch at the Cape of Good Hope. A small naval squadron under the orders of Commodore Sir Home Popham escorted the transports.

Euphrates was at Cork on 31 August, and Funchal on 29 October. She was at St Helena on 13 December, and reached the Cape on 8 March 1806.

Euphrates was at Penang on 1 June, and arrived at Calcutta on 18 July. She had parted from Northumberland off the Andaman Islands on 15 July; Northumberland did not arrive at Calcutta until 4 August.

Homeward bound, Euphrates was at Saugor on 29 December, reached St Helena on 18 April 1807, and arrived at Blackwall on 5 July.

=== EIC voyage #3 (1809–1809) ===
Captain Herbert sailed from Portsmouth on 15 April 1808, bound for Madras and Bengal. She reached Madras on 16 August and arrived at Diamond Harbour on 11 September. Homeward bound, she was at Saugor on 10 January 1809, reached St Helena on 29 April, and arrived at Blackwall on 17 July.

=== EIC voyage #4 (1810–1812) ===
Captain Herbert sailed from Portsmouth on 14 March 1810, bound for Madras and Bengal. Euphrates reached the Cape on 22 May.

She left the Cape on 13 June as part of a convoy that also included the East Indiamen Ceylon, Windham, and Astell, and one other. After Euphrates struck a rock and started to take on water, she and the fifth Indiaman turned back. In the action of 3 July 1810, the French captured Ceylon and Windham; Astell escaped.

Euphrates finally reached Madras on 10 September. There the British government hired her as a transport for its forthcoming invasion of Isle de France.

Euphrates was at Mauritius on 30 November, together with the other invasion vessels, and the actual invasion took place on 3 December. She returned to Calcutta on 7 April 1811 Calcutta. Homeward bound, she was at Saugor on 2 July.

She and Monarch left Bengal on 6 September. Euphrates returned to Madras on 26 September, and she and Monarch then left on 4 October. Euphrates reached Mauritius on 17 November, and she and Monarch left on 19 November. Euphrates reached St Helena on 3 January 1812.

There she and Monarch joined Northampton, and the three vessels sailed on 21 January with HMS Java and HMS Madagascar as escorts. At some point the escorts left the Indiamen.

While Northampton, Euprates, and Monarch were in the Channel, they encountered the British frigate HMS Nayaden, which signaled that a flotilla of five French ships of the line that had escaped from Lorient were in the vicinity and that she had exchanged some shots with them. The French, bound for Brest, continued on their route without giving chase. Monarch and Euphrates arrived at Portsmouth on 23 March. Northampton arrived at The Downs on 30 March. Euphrates arrived at Blackwall on 3 April.

== Fate ==
Captain Philip Herbert sailed from Portsmouth on 14 July 1812, bound for Bengal. Euphrates was in Columbo Roads on 21 December. She left Columbo on 29 December and at 11 p.m. on 1 January 1813 grounded on rocks 100 yards (91 m) off Dondra Head, Ceylon. Weather conditions were favourable so all aboard were able to get to shore. Much of the baggage and some of the cargo was also saved. The EIC put the value of its cargo aboard her at £9,545.
