= Rolla (1800 ship) =

History

Great Britain
- Name: Rolla
- Owner: Brown & Co.
- Builder: Temple shipbuilders, South Shields
- Launched: 18 July 1800
- Fate: No longer listed in 1858

General characteristics
- Tons burthen: 43851/94, or 440, or 451 (bm)
- Propulsion: Sail
- Armament: 1801:6 × 9-pounder guns ("short guns on the new construction"); 1805:8 × 8=pounder carronades

Rolla was a sailing ship built in 1800 at South Shields, England. She made one voyage transporting convicts to New South Wales. She then made a voyage for the British East India Company from China back to Britain. She leaves Lloyd's Register in 1858.

== Career ==
Lloyd's Register (LR) for 1801 gives the name of Rolla's master as R. Brown, her owner as Brown & Co., and her trade as London-Surinam. During the year J. New replaced R. Brown. During 1802, R. Cumming replaced J. New as master. In the 1802 issue of Lloyd's Register there is no longer any listing for armament.

=== New South Wales, China, and back (1802-04) ===
Under the command of Robert Cumming, Rolla sailed from Cork, Ireland on 4 November 1802. The Victualling Commissioners had also put on board supplies for the Colony: 22,203 pounds of sugar, 74,412 pounds of pork, and 230,496 pounds of flour; the Bill of Lading was dated 30 January 1802, i.e., in arrears.

Rolla arrived at Rio de Janeiro on 12 January 1803. She sailed from Rio on 6 February and arrived at Port Jackson on 12 May. She had left with 127 male and 37 female convicts. Eight male convicts died on the voyage.

Rolla left Port Jackson on 20 September bound for China.

While on the voyage to China, Rolla picked up survivors and cargo from Cato and HMS Porpoise, which had been wrecked on Wreck Reefs. Rolla travelled to the reefs in company with Francis and HMS Cumberland. Francis returned to Sydney with some of the men. Cumberland, with Matthew Flinders, went to the Torres Straits and on to Île de France. Lieutenants Fowler, Flinders (Matthew Flinders' brother), and John Franklin sailed with Rolla to China.

Next, Rolla sighted several of islands in the Ratak and Ralik Chains of the Marshall Islands. On 30 October she sighted islands at 5°41′N 169°27′E, which was possibly Mili Atoll. Cummings sent in a cutter, but the heavy surf prevented it from landing. On 6 November she sighted islands at 7°12′N 166°40′E, which was possibly Ailinglaplap Atoll. The next day six canoes of friendly natives came off. Next, Rolla sighted Jaluit Atoll.

Rolla arrived at Whampoa anchorage on 14 December. Homeward bound, she crossed the Second Bar on 31 January 1804. She was supposed to be part of the homeward bound fleet of East Indiamen under Nathaniel Dance, but inexplicably missed the fleet's departure. As a result, she missed the battle of Pulo Aura.

After leaving Canton, Rolla visited Malacca on 14 March, before reaching St Helena on 13 July, and arriving at the Downs on 9 October.

Rolla had travelled from St Helena in convoy with the East Indiamen City of London, Ceylon, Calcutta, and Wyndham, and two vessels from the South Seas, Lively and Vulture. (Note: Lively was a French ship launched in 1787 but captured in 1796. She was now working as a South Seas whaler under the command of Captain Magnus Smith and under ownership of David Bennett. Vulture too was a French prize, of 320 tons (bm), captured in 1800. Her master was Henry Glasspoole, and her owner Mather & Co.) Their escort was HMS Courageaux. On the way the convoy ran into severe weather with the result that Prince of Wales, which had also left St Helena with the rest, foundered with the loss of all on board; this had been her maiden voyage.

Year	Master	Owner	Trade	Source & notes
1805	R.Terry	T&R Brown	London transport	Register of Shipping (RS)
1810	R.Terry	T&R Brown	London transport	Register of Shipping (RS)
1815	Ross	T&R Brown	London transport	RS
1820	N.Banks	T.Bird	Shields–America	RS
1825	Thursby	N.Bird	London–Quebec	RS; thorough repair 1819 & 1821
1830	Humphreys	Bolton & Co.	Hull–America	RS; almost rebuilt 1828
1835	Turnley; W.Blyth	W.Blyth	Liverpool–Quebec	LR; thorough repair 1834
1840	Stephenson	T.Firbank	Hull	LR; thorough repair 1834, small repairs 1838
1845	Kheighly	T.Firbank	Hull	LR; thorough repair 1834, large repair 1844
1850		T.Firbank	Hull–Baltic	LR; thorough repair 1834, large repair 1844, small repairs 1847
1855	Cole	Brown & Co.	Hull–Quebec	LR; thorough repair 1834, large repair 1844, small repairs 1847

== Fate ==
Rolla was no longer listed in Lloyd's Register after 1858.
