= Vautour (1797 ship) =

History

France
- Name: Vautour
- Namesake: Vulture
- Builder: Bourmaud Brothers, Nantes
- Launched: 1797
- Commissioned: December 1797
- Captured: 15 January 1800

United Kingdom
- Name: Vulture
- Owner: Mather & Co.
- Acquired: 1802 by purchase
- Fate: Captured 1809; no longer listed in 1810

General characteristics
- Tonnage: 300 tons (French; "of load")
- Tons burthen: 312, or 320, (bm)
- Propulsion: Sail
- Complement: 1797: 171; 1803: 24; 1804: 30
- Armament: 1797: 4 × 12-pounder + 10 × 6-pounder guns + 6 others; 1799: 4 × 12-pounder + 16 × 6-pounder guns + 2 × 36-pounder obusier de vaisseau; 1803: 10 × 12-pounder carronades; 1804: 2 × 9-pounder guns + 10 × 12-pounder carronades + 2 swivel guns; 1804: 10 × 12-pounders (NC) (Note: NC means "Short guns of the new construction".) + 2 × 9-pounder guns; 1808: 10 × 12-pounders (NC) + 2 × 6-pounder guns

Vautour was a French privateer launched in 1797 at Nantes that made three privateering voyages. The Royal Navy captured her in 1800 during her fourth cruise. Private owners acquired her prior to late 1801 and employed her as the whaler Vulture (English for vautour) in the South Seas whale fisheries between 1801 and 1809. A Spanish privateer captured her in 1809.

== French privateer ==
Vautour was a copper-sheathed corvette that Jacques François commissioned in December 1797. She then cruised from December 1797 to May 1798. Her second cruise was under Joachim Barbier from January 1799 to February 1799, and the third from March 1799 to May under Jacques Moreau. Her last cruise took place under Mathurin (?) Leroy, until her capture.

At daybreak on 15 January 1800, HMS Apollo sighted a vessel that proceeded to attempt to evade closer scrutiny. After a short chase Apollo recaptured Lady Harwood, which had been part of the convoy that Apollo was escorting, but which had gotten separated on 1 January at the onset of gale. On 13 January Vautour, of 20 guns, had captured her.

== Capture ==
At 11a.m. on 15 January 1800, the frigate HMS Caroline was at 37°45′N 13°8′W when she sighted a strange vessel worth further examination as the vessel was bearing down on the brig Flora, of London, and another ship. Had Caroline not arrived on the scene they would have become prizes to the French vessel; as it was, they proceeded on their ways.

Caroline gave chase and at 8p.m. was able to come alongside her quarry, which immediately struck without firing a shot. The quarry was Vulture, a privateer of Nantes, out 38 days. She was pierced for 22 guns, and carried four 12-pounder guns, two 36-pounder carronades (probably obusier de vaisseau), and sixteen 6-pounder guns, two of which she had thrown overboard to lighten her during the chase. She had a crew at capture of 137 men under the command of Citizen Bazill Aug. Ene Laray. Her captors described her as "a remarkably fast Sailer".

== British whaler ==
Vulture first appeared in Lloyd's Register for 1801, where the supplement describes her as a copper-sheathed ship and French prize, and her owner as Mather & Co. (Note: One source states that she was formerly a Rotch ship out of Dunkirk that had been captured and sold to London merchants. William Rotch Jnr. was an American Quaker who had operated whalers out of Dunkirk between 1786 and 1794. Rotch had left Dunkirk well before 1800 and his vessels would have been flying American flags, not French. For Vulture to have been a prize of war and a Rotch ship, she would probably have to have been captured between 1793 and around 1795.)

Her first captain for Mather & Co. was Henry Glasspoole (or Glaspoole, or Glaspool). At that time she was valued at £8,000. Vulture left Britain on 25 October 1802, bound for Chile. Because Glasspoole had left before the resumption of war with France and was issued a letter of marque on 27 August 1803, hence in absentia. (Although Lloyd's Register (1803 and 1804) gave her owner as Mather & Co. and her trade as South Seas Fisheries, it did not describe any armament.)

Vulture was reported "all well" off Chile in March 1804, and at St Helena on 9 July 1804. She left St Helena for Britain in convoy with the East Indiamen Calcutta, City of London, Ceylon, Prince of Wales, and Wyndham, the merchant ship Rolla, which was carrying a cargo from China for the British East India Company, and Lively, another South Seas whaler. (Note: Lively was a French ship launched in 1787 but captured in 1795. She was now working as a South Seas whaler under the command of Captain Magnus Smith and under ownership of David Bennett.) Their escort was HMS Courageaux. On the way the convoy ran into severe weather with the result that Prince of Wales foundered with the loss of all on board; this had been her maiden voyage. Vulture returned to Britain on 14 October 1804 with 320 casks of oil.

Thomas Folger replaced Glasspoole in 1804. Folger was an American from Nantucket. He received a letter of marque dated 6 December 1804. Vulture sailed on 26 December 1804, bound for the Galapagos.

In 1805 Vulture was near Lima when she encountered a Spanish vessel sailing there from Concepción, Chile. The Spanish vessel bore a comparable armament to that of Vulture and a single-ship action ensued. Vulture prevailed and Folger put a prize crew of six men on board the Spanish vessel, leaving also two Englishmen who had been on board the Spaniard, as well as the Spanish boatswain and two Spanish seamen, and instructing the men to sail to St Helena. A few days later, the Spaniards managed to take over the vessel while killing all but two of the Englishman, one of whom was the only man on the vessel who knew anything of navigation. A few weeks later, the two Englishmen killed the three Spaniards. The Englishmen wrecked the Spanish vessel by running aground as they tried to enter the harbour at Mocha Island.

Cyrus reported on 8 August 1805 that Vulture had gathered 500 barrels of oil. Vulture was next reported at the Galapagos Islands on 11 September 1805. From there she and Elizabeth visited New Zealand.

On 22 July 1806 Vulture arrived at Port Jackson, from "England". She left Port Jackson for the "Fisheries" in September. Vulture returned to Britain on 2 July 1807 with 320 casks.

In the 1808 volume of Lloyd's Register Folger remained master, but a later entry that same year gave Vulture's master as Christie. There was also a modification to her armament with two 6-pounder guns replacing the two 9-pounders. This later description carried over to the 1809 Lloyd's Register.

After Vulture, Folger served as captain of several whalers: Griffin (1807–1809), Charlton (1809-1810), Catharine (1811–1812), and Rambler (1816–1819).

Vulture left Britain on 11 April 1808 under Joseph Christie's command, bound for the Pacific Ocean. She was carrying trade goods valued in excess of 800,000 dollars.

Lloyd's List reported that in October 1808, near Valparaíso, the Spanish privateer Cantabria captured Scorpion and Vulture. Cantabria captured Vulture on 27 September 1808.
