= Prince of Wales (1803 EIC ship) =

History

British East India Company
- Name: Prince of Wales
- Owner: Peter Everitt Mestaer
- Builder: Peter Everitt Mestaer, King and Queen Dock, Rotherhithe
- Launched: 8 February 1803
- Fate: Lost June 1804

General characteristics
- Tons burthen: 820, 82032/94 or 857 (bm)
- Length: 146 ft 5 in (44.6 m) (overall); 119 ft 0 in (36.3 m) (keel)
- Beam: 36 ft 0 in (11.0 m)
- Depth of hold: 14 ft 9 in (4.5 m)
- Propulsion: Sail
- Complement: 80
- Armament: 20 × 18-pounder guns

Prince of Wales was an East Indiaman launched in 1803. She was on her first voyage for the British East India Company when she foundered in 1804 on her homeward voyage. Captain John Price left the Downs on 9 May 1803, bound for Bombay and Madras. Because she was sailing in a time of war, Price took out a letter of marque, which he received on 2 July 1803. Prince of Wales left Madras on 15 April 1804.

In June Prince of Wales travelled from St Helena in convoy with the East Indiamen City of London, Ceylon, Calcutta, and Wyndham, two vessels from the South Seas, Lively and Vulture, and Rolla, which had transported convicts to New South Wales. (Note: Lively was a French ship launched in 1787 but captured in 1796. She was now working as a South Seas whaler under the command of Captain Magnus Smith and under ownership of David Bennett.) Their escort was HMS Courageaux. On the way the convoy ran into severe weather with the result that Prince of Wales foundered with the loss of all on board. She was last seen on 8 June 1804 in distress. The EIC valued her cargo at £28,860;
