= Henry Meriton =

Captain Henry Meriton (1762 – 7 August 1826) was a British sea captain who worked for the East India Company (EIC). During his service he was involved in a famous shipwreck and three naval engagements. Meriton was born in Rotherhithe. He first went to sea as an apprentice sailing on the slave ship John and Richard.

In 1783 he began his career with the EIC, starting as third mate on Pigot. He was second mate on Halsewell, which foundered off Purbeck on 6 January 1786. He wrote an account of the shipwreck with John Rogers, Third Mate. He was subsequently Chief Mate on Albion, Lord Macartney, and also on Exeter. Meriton was captain of Exeter on her fourth voyage. It was this voyage that gave Meriton his order of rank in the EIC. His rank as commander dated from 16 October 1799, when he was given command of Exeter.

It was on this voyage that Meriton participated in the action of 4 August 1800 in which Meriton and Exeter captured a French Navy frigate. Meriton was still captain of Exeter on her fifth voyage when she participated in the Battle of Pulo Aura on 14 February 1804. A fleet of East Indiamen bluffed a French squadron into withdrawing, believing that the East Indiamen were a stronger British naval squadron. After this voyage Meriton would go on to make several others for the EIC in different ships, with the result that in all he would hold the record of 12 voyages for the company.

Meriton was wounded and captured in the action of 3 July 1810 while captain of Ceylon. This was his last voyage. He then served from 1813-25 as the Marine Superintendent for the EIC in Bombay. He died in Greenwich on 7 August 1826.

== Works ==
- (1786) A circumstantial narrative of the loss of the Halsewell, East-Indiaman ... Compiled from the communications ... of Mr. Henry Meriton and Mr. John Rogers London: William Lane
