= HMS Utile (1804) =

Sloop of the Royal Navy

History

United Kingdom
- Name: Volunteer
- Builder: R & J Bulmer, South Shields
- Launched: 1803
- Fate: Sold June 1804

United Kingdom
- Name: HMS Utile
- Acquired: June 1804 by purchase
- Fate: Sold June 1814

United Kingdom
- Name: Volunteer
- Acquired: By purchase June 1814
- Fate: Last listed in 1822

General characteristics
- Tons burthen: 340, or 350 (bm)
- Sail plan: Ship-sloop
- Complement: 70 (Royal Navy)
- Armament: 1803:2 × 3-pounder guns; Royal Navy:14 × 18-pounder carronades + 2 × 9-pounder chase guns; 1816:2 × 9-pounder guns

HMS Utile was the mercantile Volunteer, launched at Newcastle-on-Tyne in 1803, that the Admiralty purchased for the Royal Navy. She had an undistinguished 10-year naval career before Admiralty sold her in 1814. She resumed the name Volunteer and after a voyage to Martinique she traded between London and Bordeaux. She was last listed in 1822.

== Career ==
=== Mercantile Volunteer ===
Volunteer appeared in the Register of Shipping in 1804 with Rudd, master, Bulmer & Co., owners, and trade Newcastle–London.

=== Royal Navy ===
The Navy purchased Volunteer in June 1804. She underwent fitting at Deptford in May–June, and then between 12 June and 4 August at Deptford Dockyard. Commander William Richardson commissioned her in June.

Around 24 March 1805, as the East Indiaman Euphrates was coming into London at the end of her voyage, Utile pressed eight of her crew. Utile also lent her eight crew men to work Euphrates into dock.

Utile was part of a fleet under Admiral Douglas when in the morning of 24 April a squadron under HMS Leda sighted twenty-six French vessels rounding Cap Gris Nez. The British captured seven schuyts, which were all of 25 to 28 tons burthen, and carried in all 117 soldiers and 43 seamen under the command of officers from the 51st. Infantry Regiment. The French convoy had been bound for Ambleteuse from Dunkirk. On the British side the only casualty was one man wounded. Utile was among the many vessels in the fleet that shared in the prize money for the capture.

On 17 October Utile recaptured the transport Carr, for which she received salvage money. Richardson died while Utile was cruising in the North Sea; the notice appeared on 1 march 1806.

In 1807 Utile was in ordinary at Sheerness. Between March and September she was fitted to lay in Yarmouth Roads. Lieutenant Edward Blaquiere commissioned her in April 1808 to serve as a receiving ship. In 1810 Lieutenant William Gilchrist replaced Blaquiere. Then in 1813 Blanquiere returned, replacing Gilchrist.

Disposal: The Principal Officers and Commissioners of His Majesty's Navy offered "Utile, of 340 tons", lying at Deptford, for sale on 30 June 1814. She sold there on that day for £2,560.

=== Mercantile Volunteer ===
Volunteer entered Lloyd's Register in 1815 with J. Ireland, master, Ireland & Co., owners, and trade London–Martinique. She had been almost rebuilt in 1814. She then traded between London and Bordeaux.

== Fate ==
Volunteer was last listed in 1822.
