= Halsewell (East Indiaman) =

1778 full-rigged ship

Coordinates: 50.589204°N 2.020572°W

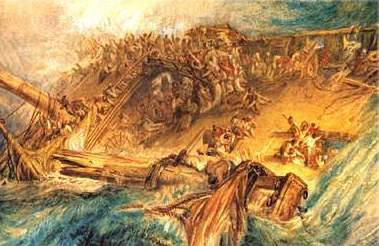
- Wreck of the Halsewell by J. M. W. Turner

History

United Kingdom
- Name: Halsewell
- Builder: Wells
- Launched: 1778
- Stricken: 6 January 1786
- Fate: Wrecked

General characteristics
- Class & type: East Indiaman
- Tons burthen: 758
- Length: 139.5 feet (42.5 m)
- Beam: 36 feet (11 m)
- Propulsion: Sails
- Sail plan: Full-rigged ship
- Armament: Cannons

The Halsewell was an East Indiaman that was wrecked on 6 January 1786 at the start of a voyage from London to Madras. She lost her masts in a violent storm in the English Channel, and was driven onto the rocks below a cliff on the Isle of Purbeck in Dorset, England. The vicar of nearby Worth Matravers recorded the event in his parish register:

On the 4th, 5th and 6th day of January, a remarkable snow storm, sometimes a hurricane, with the wind at south. On the latter day, at two in the morning, the Halsewell East Indiaman, 758-tons burthen, commanded by Captain Richard Pierce, bound for Bengal, was lost in the rocks between Seacombe and Winspit quarries in this parish. Never did happen so complete a wreck. The ship long before day-break was shattered to pieces...

Of over 240 crew and passengers, only 74 survived. The shipwreck shocked the nation. The King visited the scene of the tragedy. The wreck of the Halsewell was the subject of poems, paintings and an orchestral symphony. Many years later Charles Dickens described the wreck in a short story.

== First voyages ==
The Halsewell was an East-Indiaman of 776 tons (bm), launched in 1778. She had three decks, a length of 139.5 feet (42.5 m) and a breadth of 36 feet (11 m). Throughout her career she was under the command of Captain Richard Pierce.

On her maiden voyage the Halsewell sailed to Madras and China, leaving Portsmouth on 6 March 1779 and after stopping at Madeira, Gorée and the Cape of Good Hope reached Madras on 18 January 1780. She then sailed on via Malacca to Whampoa, which she reached on 1 September 1780. On her return voyage she stopped at Saint Helena on 19 May 1781 and reached the Downs on 20 October 1781.

On her second voyage the Halsewell left Portsmouth on 11 March 1783, stopped at São Tiago and Johanna and reached Madras on 26 July 1783. The ship returned via Kedgeree, Saugor and Saint Helena, reaching the Downs on 28 August 1784.

== Last voyage ==
English Channel

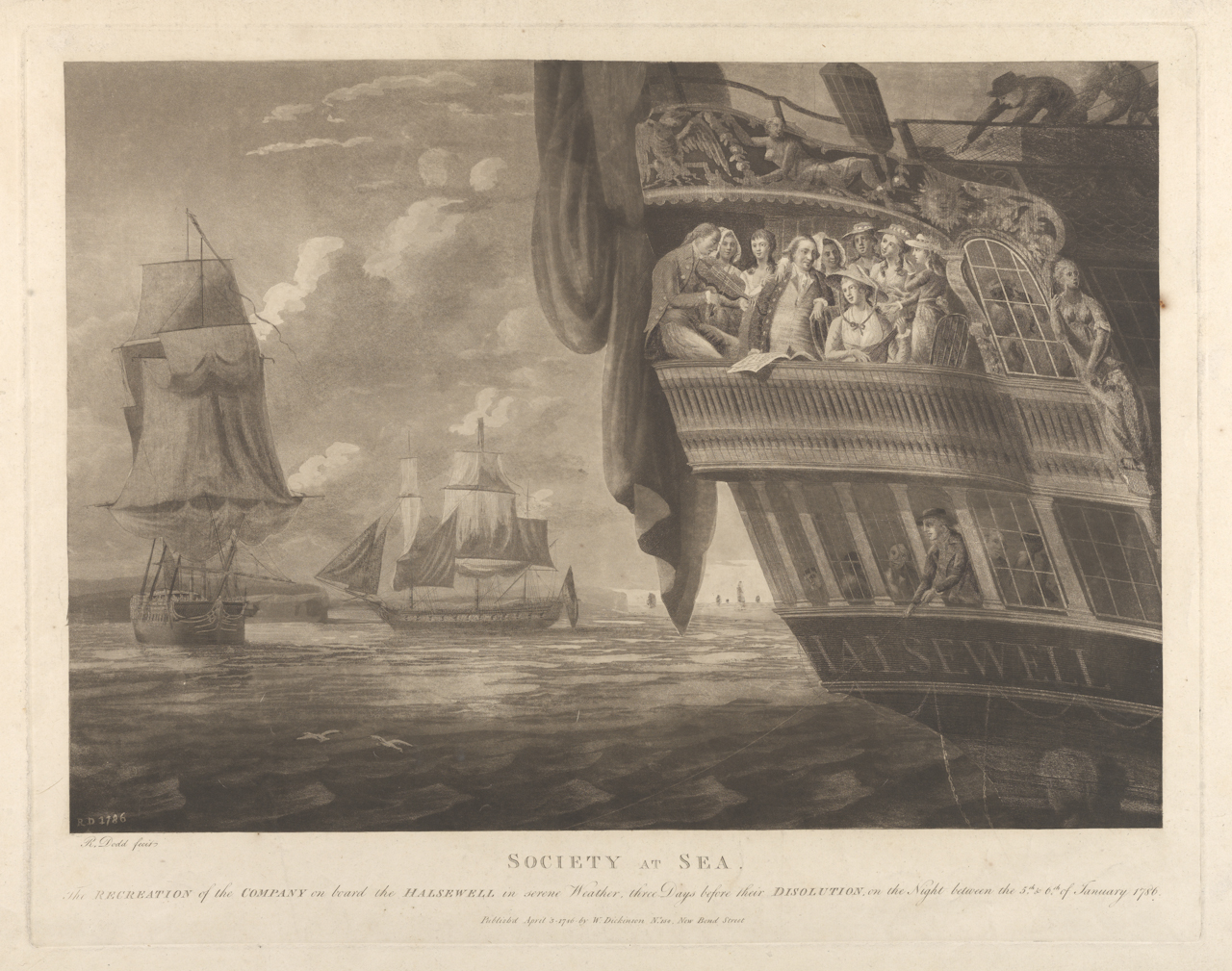
The recreation of the company on board the Halsewell in serene weather, three days before their dissolution

Before her last voyage, the Halsewell was considered to be in excellent condition, with an ample and experienced crew.

On 16 November 1785 she dropped down the Thames to Gravesend to take on supplies for her third voyage to the east. At the end of December the passengers boarded at the Hope, including a sizable contingent of soldiers being sent as reinforcements to the East India Company. The passengers included the two daughters of Captain Pierce. Pierce was the oldest of the East India company's captains, and planned to retire after the voyage.

The ship sailed through the Downs on 1 January 1786. The wind died the next day, offshore from the Dunnose headland on the south east of the Isle of Wight, becalming the ship.

During the afternoon of 2 January a breeze came up from the south, and the ship ran in closer to shore to be able to land the pilot. That evening a snowstorm began and the ship anchored in 18 fathoms of water. Due to the weather conditions it was not possible to furl all the sails. On 3 January a violent gale began to blow from east of northeast. The crew cut the anchor cable so the ship could run out to sea. At noon that day they met a brig, who took the pilot, then continued westward down the channel. In the evening the wind increased in strength, now coming from the south. The gale carried a heavy load of snow. The crew had to run up most of the sails to avoid being blown on shore. Because she was heeled over, the hawse plugs were washed in and the ship took on large amounts of water on the gun deck.

A leak was discovered, with five feet of water in the hold. The sailors manned all the pumps. In the morning of 4 January the crew twice tried unsuccessfully to wear the ship. The mizzen-mast (Note: A three-masted ship has a fore-mast towards the front, a main mast near the center and the mizzen-mast, usually the shortest of the three, immediately aft of the main-mast.) was lost in the process. The leak was too much for the pumps to handle. With seven feet in the hold the ship was near to foundering.

The captain decided to cut away the main mast to reduce the burden. The fall of the mast carried away five men, who were drowned. The sailors cleared the wreckage and managed to get the ship before the wind. The pumps began to gain on the leak.

By ten in the morning the wind had dropped, and the ship began to roll violently. The foremast was rolled over, destroying the foresail. By eleven the weather had improved and the wind was from the west. Berry Head, the southeast point of Torbay, was seen between six and nine miles distant.

The crew set up a jury main mast and began heading back east towards Portsmouth, spending the rest of the day trying to set up a jury mizzen mast. In the morning of 5 January the wind began blowing strongly from the south again. At eight in the evening the Portland lights were observed, from 12 to 15 miles distant in a north of northwest direction. The crew managed to turn to a westward course, but found that they were running towards shore so changed back to an eastward course, hoping to round Peverel Point and anchor in Studland Bay.

== Wreck ==
Location of the wreck in Dorset

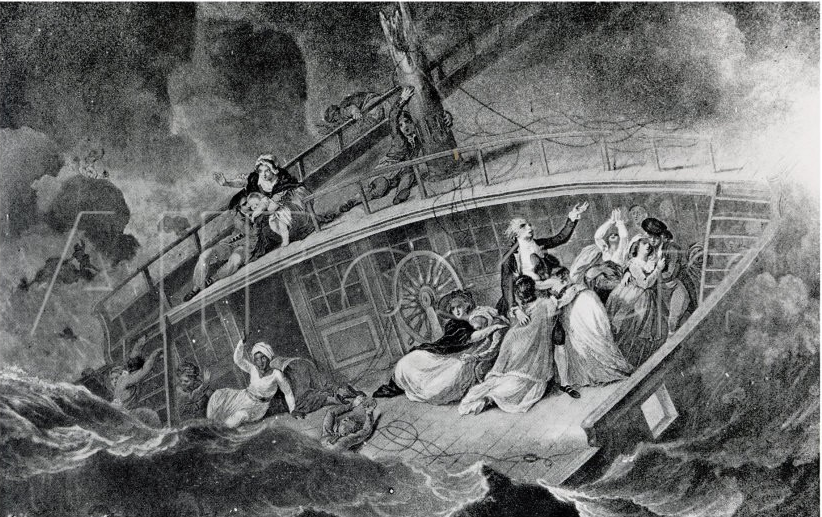
Loss of the East Indiaman Halsewell by Robert Smirke

At eleven in the evening St Alban's Head was sighted about 1.5 miles (2.4 km) to the leeward. The crew took all the sails in and released the small bower anchor. After an hour the ship began to drive towards the shore. They released a sheet anchor, which held for two hours, when the ship again began to drive towards shore. The captain and the chief officer agreed among themselves that the ship was lost, and decided the officers should be asked to reserve the longboat for the ladies and themselves if possible. At about two on the morning on 6 January the ship struck violently on the rocks, beating upon them and then falling with her broadside facing the shore. The chief officer told the crew to escape over the rocks if they could.

The ship had struck at the foot of a tall and near-vertical cliff near Seacombe, on the Isle of Purbeck, between Peverel point and St. Alban's head. It had run aground at the mouth of a cave 10 to 12 yards (9.1 to 11.0 m) deep in the base of the cliff, as wide as the length of the ship. Some of the sailors and soldiers managed to escape to flat rocks below the cliff and others to the rocks in the cave. The passengers and officers, numbering almost fifty people, including three black women and two soldiers' wives, took refuge in the round-house (cabin). This was destroyed when a heavy sea washed over the wreck. The same wave carried two men who had seized a hen coop onto the rocks, where they were badly bruised but safe. It took less than an hour for the ship to be dashed to pieces.

The survivors who had reached the cave faced the extremely difficult task of gaining rocks above the reach of the tide, and then of finding a way to climb along the base of the cliff, then up to safety. A number died in the attempt. The first to reach the top of the cliff, the cook and the quartermaster, went for help. Workmen from a nearby quarry came to the aid of the survivors, hauling them up with ropes. There were further casualties among the exhausted men during this stage. There were only 74 survivors. These included five of the ship's officers, forty seamen and twenty-five soldiers. The surviving sailors had to make their own way back to London on foot. It was reported that the "rapacious plunderers on the sea coast ... are so devoid of humanity as to strip the bodies of the dead as soon as the waves have thrown them on the shore." However, some gentlemen of the area had made sure that the bodies were given a proper burial.

== Reactions ==
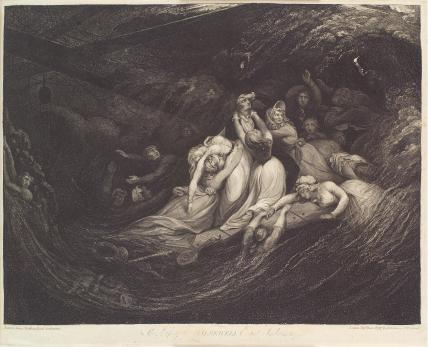
Loss of the Halsewell by James Gillray

King George III came to view the scene of the wreck with several members of his family. The Dorset poet William Holloway wrote a poem about the royal visit to the spot. An anonymous poem was published called the "Monody on the Death of Captain Pierce". On 30 January 1786 the Eidophusikon show reopened at Exeter Change in an auditorium that held 200 people, a show that combined pictures with lighting effects and sounds. Opening just three weeks after the tragedy, the new show included an "exact, awful and tremendous Representation of that lamentable event". The show was put on by Philip James de Loutherbourg, a former scenery painter. Henry Meriton and John Rogers, two officers who managed to escape, later published their account of the events. (Note: The Circumstantial Narrative seems to have reached 17 editions. A later reviewer said of it, "The facts of the Narrative are most touching, its sentimentality worthy of a place in any museum of stuffed platitudes.") To commemorate the event, Augustus Frederic Christopher Kollmann composed "The shipwreck, or the Loss of the East Indiaman Halsewell", an orchestral symphony. Henry James Pye published a poem that began,

What language can describe, what colours shew,
Each varied form of terror and of woe?
With pallid features, and dishevell'd hair,
In all the agony of dumb despair,
Here on the deck the wretched victim lies,
And views approaching death with lifted eyes,
Here piercing cries, drown'd by the founding main,
Invoke an abient mother's aid in vain.

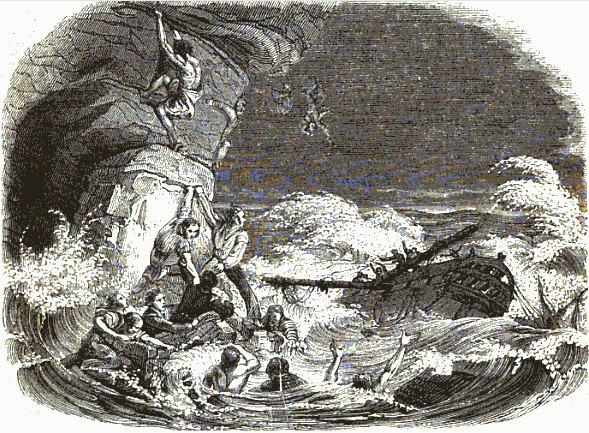
Picture from an 1813 account that tries to show all aspects of what happened.

In February 1787 the County Magazine published a poem by George Smith that began,

What dreadful scenes on Albion's rocks!
The very thought all nature shocks!
How painful to relate!
Oh, Halsewell! and thy wretched crew!
Methinks I have them still in view,
In their distracted state!

The wreck was still being discussed fifty years later. The idea of the father with his two daughters waiting in the roundhouse for their fate, and the scene of the cave below the sheer cliff, added drama to the story. An 1830 article advocating construction of a breakwater in the Portland Roads (Note: In 1849 the Royal Navy started construction of a breakwater beside the Isle of Portland, the first stage in developing Portland Harbour, the largest man-made harbor in the United Kingdom.) between Plymouth and Portsmouth implied that if such a haven had been available, the Halsewell would not have had to make for Portsmouth, and so would not have been wrecked. An article in The Temperance Tales of 1853 said the wreck "arose from the drunken desperation of the crew." Charles Dickens wrote a short story called "The Long Voyage" that recalled the shipwreck, published in 1853.

An 1856 account said that some old people of the region still remembered the wreck, and that sometimes fragments of the ship's timbers and copper were washed ashore or found in the rocks. Many of the ship's guns had been recovered, but more remained at the foot of the cliffs, covered with debris. The mounds of four long graves could still be discerned in a flat area nearby where the cliffs were broken by a small valley formed by an intermittent stream.

== Today ==
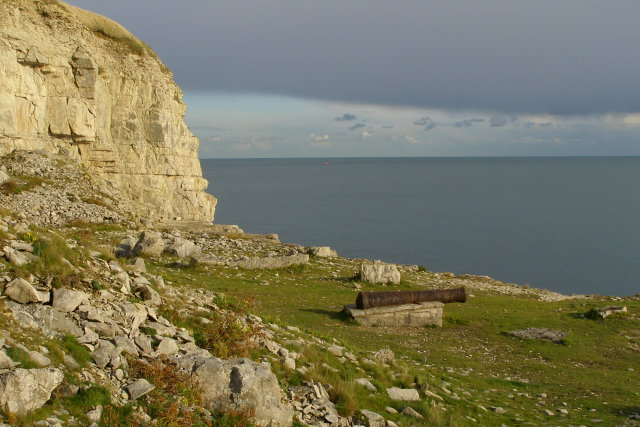
Hedbury Quarry. The cannon in the middle of the photo may have come from the wreck of the Halsewell

The wreck lies between two steep hills named East and West Man, midway between the landing places of Seacombe and Winspit (formerly Windspit).

In 1967 three divers from Swanage located one of the ship's cannons, as well as coins, cannonballs, lead shot, tackle and glass.

Some relics from the wreck are held by the Dorchester museum. The Worth Matravers church has a mirror from the ship hanging above the main door. The United Kingdom's Maritime and Coastguard Agency and the Nautical Archaeology Society have been jointly piloting an "Adopt-A-Wreck" plan using the wreck of the Halsewell.
