= Action of 3 July 1810 =

1810 battle of the Mauritius campaign of 1809–1811

- Part of the Mauritius campaign of 1809–1811
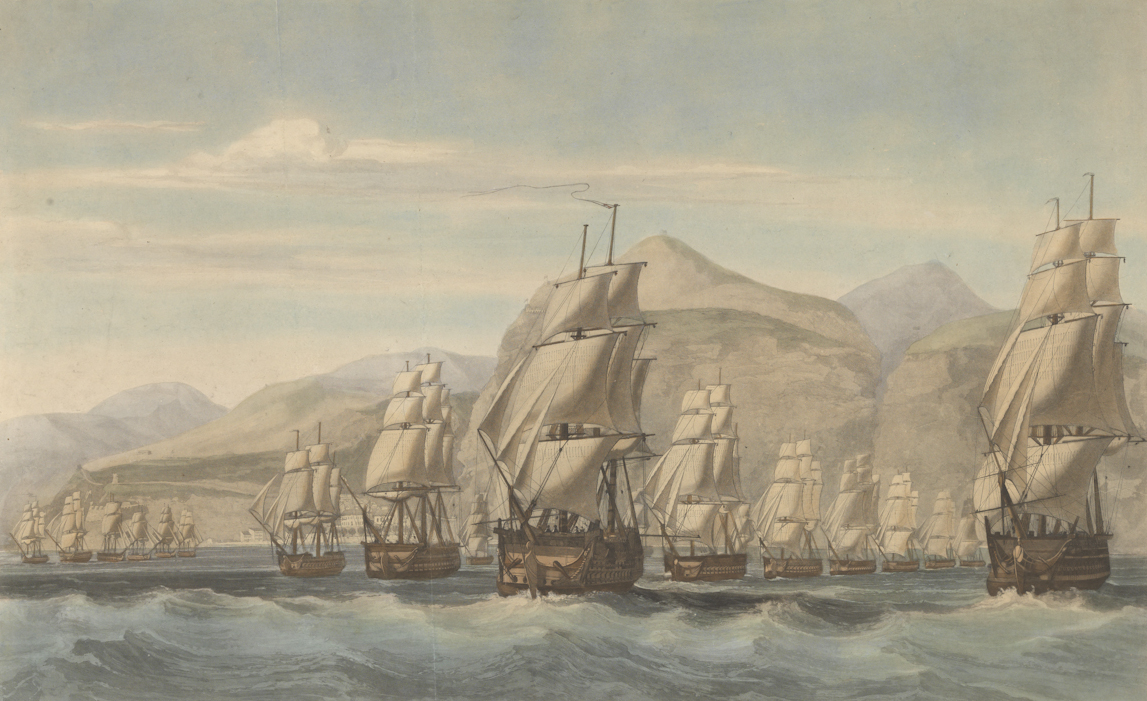
- Windham (centre), one of the ships involved in the action
Date	3 July 1810
Location	Off the Comoro Islands, Indian Ocean
Result	French victory

Belligerents
France	East India Company

Commanders and leaders
Guy-Victor Duperré	Henry Meriton

Strength
2 frigates 1 brig	3 merchant ships

Casualties and losses
22 killed 38 wounded	20 killed 76 wounded 2 merchant ships captured

The action of 3 July 1810 was a minor naval engagement of the Napoleonic Wars, in which a French frigate squadron under Guy-Victor Duperré attacked and defeated a convoy of three British East Indiamen near the Comoro Islands. Both sides suffered 20 or more sailors killed before two East Indiamen surrendered. These were Ceylon and the British flagship Windham, which held off the French squadron long enough for the ship Astell to escape. It was the third successful French attack on an Indian Ocean convoy in just over a year, and the second time the French had captured Windham. The French frigates were part of a squadron operating from the Isle de France under Commodore Jacques Hamelin.

Although a British frigate squadron under Josias Rowley was under orders to eliminate the French raiders, Rowley was distracted by the planned invasion of Isle Bonaparte, which began the following week. Combined with limited British resources in the region, this allowed the French frigates significant freedom to attack British interests across the Ocean. The attack on Isle Bonaparte was however part of a wider British strategy to seize and capture French raiding bases, and the success of the operation severely limited future French operations as Hamelin's squadron was required for the defence of Isle de France. As a result, this was the last successful attack on a British merchant convoy in the Indian Ocean during the Napoleonic Wars.

== Background ==
Since the beginning of the Napoleonic Wars in 1803, French privateers and naval frigates operating from the fortified island bases of Isle de France and Isle Bonaparte had attacked British shipping in the Indian Ocean. The huge distances involved, restrictions on supplies and the presence of Royal Navy warships and heavily armed East Indiamen had prevented these relatively weak French ships from attacking the convoys that transported millions of pounds worth of goods from British India and the Far East to the United Kingdom. When one French squadron under Admiral Linois had tried to seize a convoy in 1805, it had been driven off by the aggressive tactics of the merchant captains.

In late 1808, the French Navy despatched five frigates to the Indian Ocean to rendezvous at Isle de France under the command of Commodore Jacques Hamelin. Although only four frigates eventually reached the French island, these were new vessels carrying 40 heavy guns each under orders to attack British shipping in the Bay of Bengal, in particular the large East Indiamen of the Honourable East India Company (HEIC). The first frigate to do so was Caroline, which attacked a Europe-bound convoy in the action of 31 May 1809. Capturing two East Indiamen carrying over £500,000 worth of silk, Caroline brought her prizes back to the fortified port of Saint Paul on Isle Bonaparte.

The British commander at the Cape of Good Hope, Albemarle Bertie, had also been planning an operation in the Indian Ocean during 1809 and assembled a squadron under Commodore Josias Rowley with orders to blockade the French islands, probe their defences and capture them if practical. Rowley found that his small squadron was unable to engage the French frigates and that the nearest British military base, Madras in British India, was much too far away to be practical for staging amphibious operations. To remedy the latter problem, Rowley seized the small French island of Rodriguez with a force of British and Indian soldiers and garrisoned it as a supply base for his ships and as a military reserve to use in landings on the French islands. The first such operation was the Raid on Saint Paul in September 1809, in which the town of Saint Paul was captured, Caroline and her prizes seized; Isle Bourbon's commander Nicolas Des Bruslys was driven to suicide.

== Continued raiding ==
Despite the British attack on Saint Paul, French frigates continued to operate in the Indian Ocean, Hamelin personally leading a cruise in the Bay of Bengal during the autumn. His ships seized a number of small merchantmen and in the action of 18 November 1809 he personally defeated and captured three large East Indiamen in convoy. Before his squadron and their prizes returned to Isle de France in late December, they had also captured the British brig HMS Victor and the large Portuguese frigate Minerva. During the winter few ships were at sea, as the risk of being caught in a seasonal hurricane was considered too severe to operate between December and March. Rowley correspondingly withdrew most of his forces to the Cape of Good Hope, leaving a handful of smaller ships to watch the French islands. Hamelin too kept his forces in harbour at Isle de France, replenishing his ships and recruiting sailors from the large pool of unemployed men in Port Napoleon.

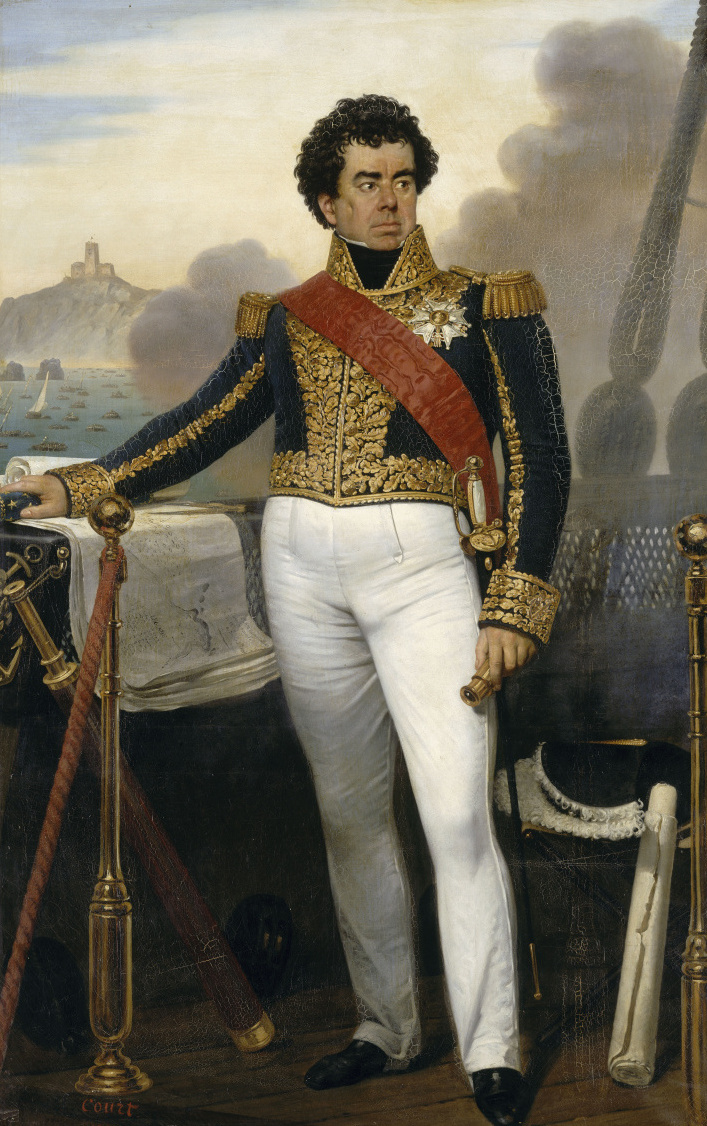
Guy-Victor Duperré, the French commander at the action

On 14 March, before Rowley could return to his blockade, Hamelin ordered a squadron to sea. This force consisted of the large frigate Bellone, the captured Minerva (now renamed Minerve) and the captured brig Victor. The force was led by Guy-Victor Duperré on Bellone, with Pierre Bouvet in Minerve as his second in command. Avoiding the remaining frigates of the British blockade, Duperré's ships escaped unnoticed and began cruising in the Bay of Bengal, capturing a few small vessels but making no serious impression on British trade in the region. By 1 June, Duperré had moved to the Western Indian Ocean, sailing off Madagascar in the hope of sighting British ships from Cape Town. Due to the extended period at sea, his ships were in a poor state of repair and much of the following month was spent conducting repairs at isolated beaches.

== Battle ==
At 06:00 on 3 July, Duperré's squadron was cruising off the small island of Mayotta when sails were sighted 36 nautical miles (67 km) to the north east. Giving chase immediately, Duprée discovered that his quarry was a convoy of three British East Indiamen, Ceylon, Windham, under Captain Stewart, and Astell, commanded by Henry Meriton in Ceylon. Meriton was an experienced captain who had twice successfully defended convoys from French raiders: firstly at the action of 4 August 1800, when his ship Exeter had forced the surrender of the Médée, and then at the Battle of Pulo Aura in 1804. The convoy had departed from Cape Town on 13 June with five ships, but two had to turn back after Euphrates struck a rock and began to take in water. The others continued towards Madras via the Mozambique Channel. One of the East Indiamen, Windham, her captain John Stewart and many of her crew had been engaged and captured by Hamelin on 22 November 1809 in the Bay of Bengal and recaptured a month later by HMS Magicienne off Isle de France. While Duperré's three ships mounted 108 guns and carried trained naval crews, the British ships had approximately 75 cannon between them and only a handful of their sailors were trained to military standards. Primarily crewed by lascar seamen, who had proven unreliable in the previous convoy actions, the merchant ships' advantages lay in their large size and the 250 soldiers of the 24th Regiment of Foot that were aboard the ships. These troops were on passage to India and would be able to provide musket fire and repel boarders should the French attempt to board.

Confident that his squadron outclassed his opponent, Duperré ordered his ships to chase the East Indiamen, who, at Stewart's suggestion, attempted to close with the shore where the wind and waves would not be as strong and they could better resist the French attack. By 09:30 however the Astell was forced to reduce sail or risk snapping her topmasts. This slowed the British convoy, Windham and Ceylon slowing too to protect Astell. Realising that he could not outrun Duperré, Meriton turned his ships about to engage the French frigates. At 11:30, Bellone closed the gap between the squadron and convoy to 4 nautical miles (7.4 km) and Meriton ordered his ships to form a battle line to meet the French attack.

The French attacked at 14:15, Minerve approaching the British line and opening fire on the central ship Ceylon. In the intervening time, the British battleline had become disorganised, with Astell too far to the rear to properly support the other ships. With the British line wavering, Minerve and Victor closed with the convoy and began to exchange fire with the three merchant ships in a general action, during which Robert Hay, captain of Astell, was seriously wounded. At 16:00, Bouvet in Minerve pulled ahead of the struggling convoy and turned as if to ram and board Windham. Hoping to use the soldiers aboard to drive off the French ship, Captain Stewart turned to meet her. The damage done to Windham was however so severe that she was unable to make the turn correctly and Minerve passed just ahead of her, raking Windham and causing severe damage, the soldiers on Windham responding with musket fire.

As Minerve turned back towards the British convoy with the intention of cutting off the rearmost ships, Astell passed her more damaged companions to become the first ship in line. This left Windham, now at the rear, to face Minerve alone. Fortunately for Stewart, Minerve lost two topmasts as she turned to face his ship and had to pull away from the British to effect repairs. An hour and a half later, at 18:30, Bellone joined the action, attacking Windham directly. Victor supported Bellone and accompanied the flagship as she moved ahead to attack Ceylon and Astell. By 19:00, with Ceylon damaged so severely that she could no longer effectively sail or fight, third officer Tristam Fleming hauled the ship out of the battle line and ordered his crew to cease firing: Meriton and his second officer Thomas Oldham had both been seriously wounded by grape shot.

With Ceylon no longer engaged, Duperré pulled ahead to engage Astell but found that Stewart had brought his battered Windham between the French frigate and the third East Indiaman. In the growing darkness, Stewart attempted to hail Astell to propose boarding Bellone together, but the remaining officers either ignored or did not hear the suggestion as Astell extinguished all her lights and made all sail to escape the action, receiving a final broadside from Bellone as she pulled away. Alone, Stewart continued to engage the French ships to enable Astell to make her escape. At 19:20 the repaired Minerve returned and took possession of Ceylon, and at 19:45 Stewart surrendered for the second time in less than a year: his ship badly damaged and casualties mounting among his crew and passengers. (Note: Troude states that Astell had struck soon after Windham, around 19:25, but that she took opportunity of the growing darkness to escape before the French took possession.)

== Aftermath ==
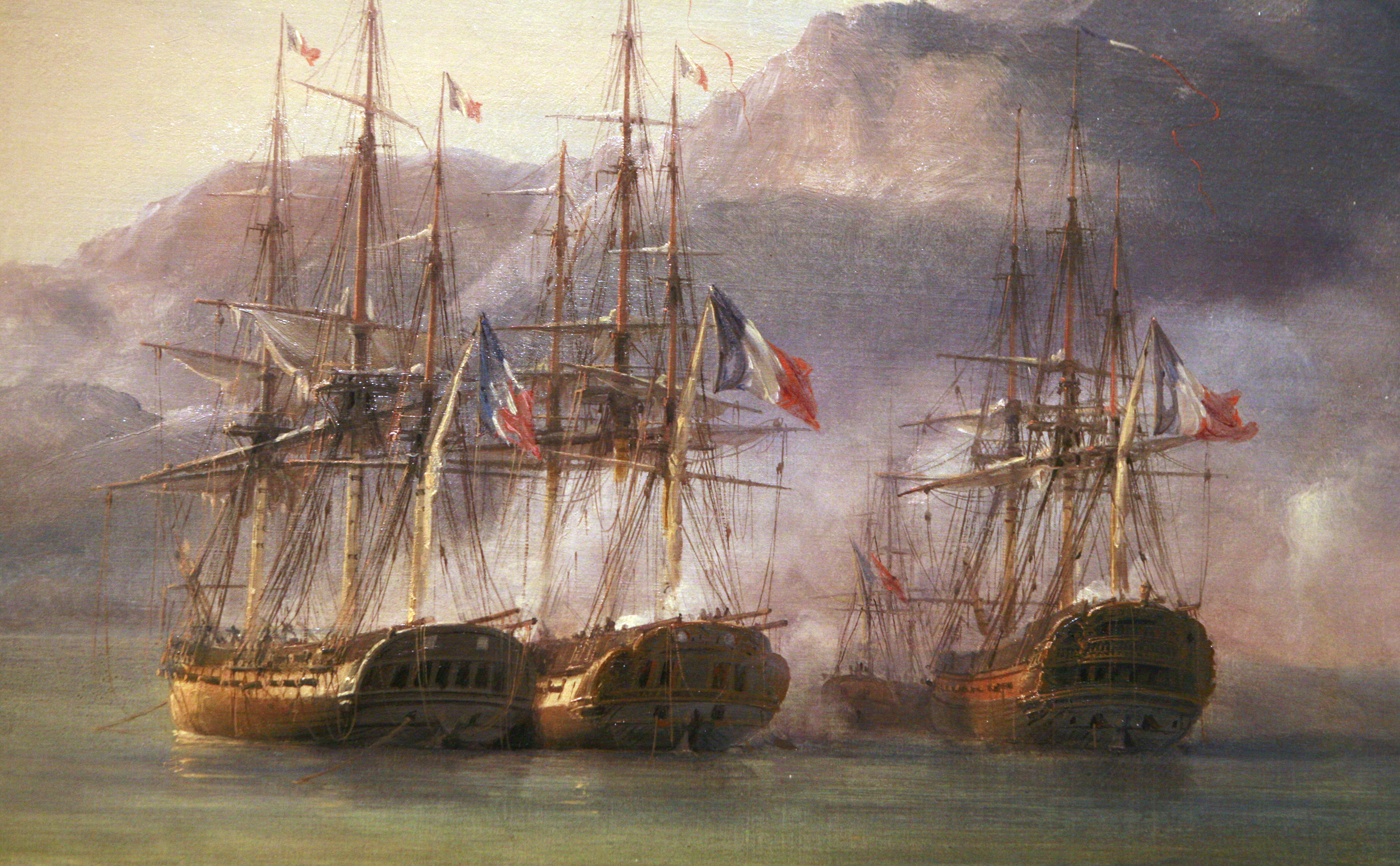
Ceylon (far right) at the Battle of Grand Port

Astell was the only British ship to escape, disappearing in the darkness and later reaching a safe port from which despatches were sent to London recounting the action. On the basis of these accounts, the crew and officers of Astell were rewarded with £2,000 from the company directors to be shared among them. Casualties in the British convoy had been heavy, Windham losing six killed and 18 wounded, Ceylon six killed and 21 wounded (including Meriton and Oldham) and Astell eight killed and 37 wounded (including Hay). In all, 20 British sailors and soldiers were killed and 76 wounded during the engagement. French losses were 22 killed and 38 wounded: four killed and six wounded on Bellone, 17 killed and 29 wounded on Minerve and one killed and three wounded on Victor. The prizes were very severely damaged and Duperré took his squadron to an isolated beach on Anjouan until 17 July to effect repairs, before returning to Isle de France. Command of Ceylon, renamed Ceylan, was awarded to Lieutenant Vincent Moulac, of Minerve, and that of Windham, to ensign d'Arod.

Duperré did not meet any British ships on his journey back to the French island, as most of the British blockade squadron were busy in the aftermath of the invasion of Isle Bonaparte, conducted during July by Commodore Rowley. With the British distracted by this amphibious operation, it was simple for Duperré to reach Grand Port on the south east coast of Isle de France in spite of the small blockade squadron under Captain Samuel Pym. This narrow and well-protected anchorage was considered to be the best place to refit the battered French squadron, but in August it came under attack by a British squadron in the Battle of Grand Port. This action was a disaster for the British as their ships became grounded in the unfamiliar shoals of the harbour and four frigates were lost under fire from shore batteries and Duperré's squadron.
