= Lively (1796 ship) =

History

France
- Name: Duchesse d'Aiguillon
- Namesake: Marie Madeleine d'Aiguillon
- Owner: 1765:Claude Fichet, Étables; 1793:Louis Fichet, Binic
- Builder: Solidor, Saint-Servan
- Launched: 1765
- Renamed: Abeille (Bee)
- Captured: 1795

Great Britain
- Name: Lively
- Owner: 1798:A. Dixon; 1798-loss:Daniel Bennett
- Acquired: 1796 by purchase of a prize
- Fate: Wrecked c.1808

General characteristics
- Type: Ship
- Tons burthen: French records:200, or 300, or 330; British records: 240, or 241 (bm)
- Length: 88 ft 10 in (27.1 m) (overall)
- Beam: 25 ft 9 in (7.8 m)
- Draught: 14 ft 0 in (4.3 m) (laden)
- Crew: Duchesse (1765): 73; Abeille: 20
- Armament: 1765: 10 guns (pierced for 14); 1800: 10 × 9-pounder guns; 1804: 10 × 4-pounder guns
- Notes: Two decks with a forecastle and a quarterdeck, and three masts

Lively was launched at Saint-Malo in 1765 as Duchesse d'Aiguillon. She spent her first years cod-fishing at Newfoundland. She was renamed Abeille after the French Revolution and became a transport in the service of the government. HMS Hebe captured her in 1795. A. Dixon purchased her, and Daniel Bennett purchased her from Dixon in 1798. He then employed her as whaler on some six complete voyages. She was lost c.1808 on her seventh voyage.

== Early career ==
On 15 April 1765 Duchesse sailed to Newfoundland. She returned to Saint-Malo via Marseille on 17 February 1766.

After the Revolution Duchesse d'Aiguillon became Abeille. Abeille, Jean-François Mabeas, master, sailed from Binic on 21 April 1792 to fish for cod off Newfoundland. From January 1793 on Abeille served the Republican Government as a transport.

== Capture ==
Captain René Pierre Terlet, of Binic, sailed Abeille in ballast from Binic to Saint-Malo. He was on his way back to Saint-Malo, still in ballast, on 3 July 1795.

On 3 July HMS Melampus and HMS Hebe intercepted a convoy of 13 vessels off St Malo. Melampus captured an armed brig and Hebe captured six merchant vessels: Maria Louisa, Abeille, Bon Foi, Patrouille, Eleonore, and Pecheur. The brig of war was armed with four 24-pounders and had a crew of 60 men. Later she was identified as the 4-gun Vésuve. The Royal Navy took Vésuve into service as HMS Vesuve. The convoy had been on its way from Île-de-Bréhat to Brest. British casualties amounted to two men killed and 17 wounded. Seaflower, Daphne, and the cutter Sprightly shared in the prize and head money.

== Lively ==
The High Court of Admiralty condemned Abeille on 9 January 1796. A. Dixon purchased her and renamed her Lively, but there is no record of his having utilized her. Daniel Bennett purchased her from Dixon in 1798. She underwent a great repair and he then employed her as whaler on some eight voyages.

Voyage 1: Lively, Magnus Smith, master, returned on 17 May 1799 from South Georgia.
Voyage 2: In March 1800. Lively, Magnus Smith, master, returned from South Georgia.
Voyage 3: Captain Magnus Smith sailed Lively on 25 April 1800 and returned on 6 February 1801.
Voyage 4: Captain Magnus Smith sailed Lively on 31 March 1801 and returned on 21 February 1802.
Voyage 5; Lively, Shubael Moore, master, left Britain on 9 April 1803. She was reported at Delagoa Bay in 1804. In mid-1804, HMS Courageaux escorted a convoy from St Helena back to Britain. The convoy consisted of the East Indiamen City of London, Ceylon, Calcutta, and Wyndham, two vessels from the South Seas, Lively and Vulture, and the ship Rolla, which had transported convicts to New South Wales. On the way the convoy ran into severe weather with the result that Prince of Wales, which had also left St Helena with the rest, foundered with the loss of all on board; this had been her maiden voyage. Lively arrived back in Britain on 14 October 1804 with Keaston, master.
Voyage 6: Lively left Britain on 3 December 1804 with Joseph Whiteus (also Whittens, Withers, Whitess, or Whitehouse), master. She was reported to have arrived at St Helena on 17 January 1806. She returned to Britain on 15 September 1806.
Voyage 7: Lively sailed on 19 November 1806 in company with Duke of Portland and Ranger. Joseph Whiteus remained her master.

== Loss ==
Lively was lost in early 1808. She was probably returning in company with Ranger from whaling in the Moluccas and around Timor when she wrecked. Ranger apparently rescued Whiteus and his crew, and perhaps her cargo as well.

Ranger arrived back in London on 18 December 1808. Whiteus sailed as her master on her next voyage.

A wreck discovered at Mermaid's Reef (Rowley Shoals) at 16°20′S 119°35′E is believed to be Lively.
