= French frigate Bellone (1808) =

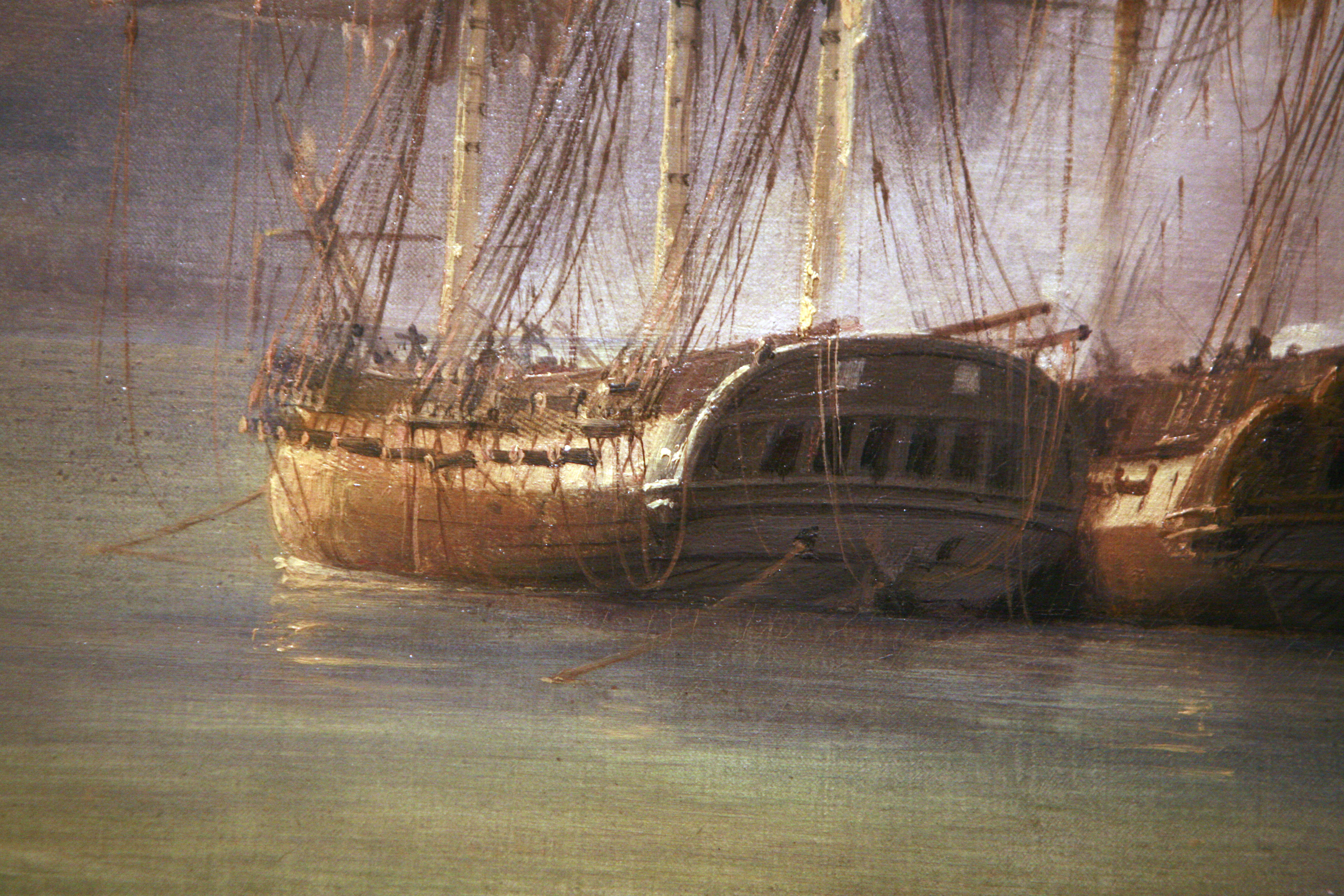
- Bellone at the Battle of Grand Port.

History

France
- Name: Bellone
- Namesake: Bellona
- Ordered: 14 January 1803
- Builder: Saint Servan (near Saint Malo; Ethéart company), plans by Sané
- Laid down: March 1806
- Launched: February 1808
- Commissioned: 8 May 1809
- Captured: 4 December 1810

United Kingdom
- Name: Junon
- Acquired: 4 December 1810 by capture
- Out of service: 1817

General characteristics
Class & type	Consolante-class frigate
Displacement	1320 tonnes
Tons burthen	109183/94 (bm)
Length	48.75 metres (159.9 ft)
Beam	12.2 metres (40 ft)
Draught	5.9 metres (19 ft)
Propulsion	Sail
Armament	Battery: 28 x 18-pounder guns; QD and Fc: 12 x 8-pounder guns
Armour	Timber

Bellone was a 44-gun Consolante-class frigate of the French Navy.

== French service ==
Bellone, under the command of Guy-Victor Duperré, departed Saint-Malo on 18 January 1809, bound for the Indian Ocean. She sailed from La Réunion for a combat patrol in August. On 2 November she captured HMS Victor. Twenty days later, she captured the 48-gun Portuguese Minerva after a 2-hour battle. Bellone sailed back to La Réunion with her prize, arriving on 2 January 1810.

In April 1810, the squadron comprising Bellone, Minerve and Victor departed for another patrol, during which they fought the action of 3 July 1810 and the Battle of Grand Port.

Bellone was surrendered to the British when Île de France fell, on 4 December 1810.

== British service ==
Bellone was recommissioned in the Royal Navy as HMS Junon.

In June 1812, Junon escorted a convoy from Portsmouth to India.

On 8 February 1813, nine boats and 200 men of the squadron of which Junon was part captured the letter of marque schooner Lottery. Lottery was of 210 tons burthen (bm), copper-bottomed and fastened, and carried six 12-pounder carronades, though she was pierced for 16 cannon. Her crew put up a strong defense with the result that the British cutting out party suffered six men wounded, half severely or dangerously, one of whom died later; Junon herself suffered two men wounded. The Americans suffered 19 men wounded, including their captain, John Southcomb, before they struck. Southcomb died of his wounds and his body was taken ashore. Lottery had been carrying a cargo of coffee, sugar and lumber from Baltimore to Bordeaux. A week later Lottery convoyed several prizes to Bermuda. The Royal Navy took Lottery into service as HMS Canso.

In June 1813, Junon's boats raided the James River, and she sustained an attack by US gunboats.

On 3 April 1814, as she sailed with HMS Tenedos, she encountered the USS Constitution, which fled at all sail, dropping drinking water and food overboard, and eventually making it to Marblehead harbour.

Junon, Maidstone, Arab, and Curlew, shared in the detention, on 23 November of Firmina, of 260 tons (bm), Antonio Jose Fereira, master. She had been sailing from Boston to Amelia Island in ballast. The Vice admiralty court in Halifax restored her to her owners.
