= Guy-Victor Duperré =

French Navy officer (1775–1846)

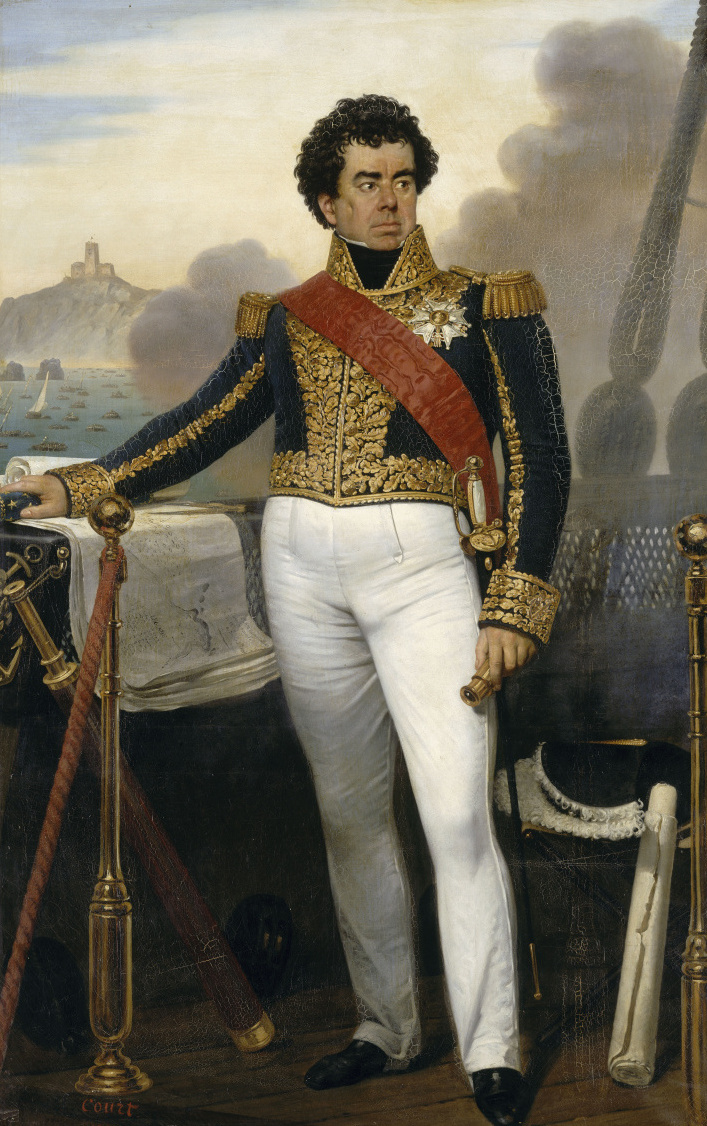
- Portrait by Joseph-Désiré Court, 1832
- Born: 20 February 1775; La Rochelle, France
- Died: 2 November 1846 (aged 71); Paris, France
- Military career
- Allegiance: France
- Branch: French Navy
- Service years: 1792–1843
- Rank: Admiral of France
- Conflicts: French Revolutionary Wars; Napoleonic Wars; Mauritius Campaign; Action of 3 July 1810; Battle of Grand Port; Siege of Venice; Invasion of Algiers in 1830
- Awards: Peer of the Empire; Peer of France; Inscription on the Arc de Triomphe; Légion d'honneur
- Other work: Préfet maritime of Brest; Minister of the Navy

Admiral of France Guy-Victor Duperré (20 February 1775 – 2 November 1846) was a French Navy officer. He is known for commanding French naval forces in the Mauritius campaign of 1809–1811 and was victorious in the Battle of Grand Port, where he was wounded. Later he had a command in the Mediterranean and continued to serve during and after the Bourbon Restoration. He commanded the naval elements of the expeditionary force that carried out the Invasion of Algiers in 1830 and went on to become Minister of the Navy three times.

== Early life ==
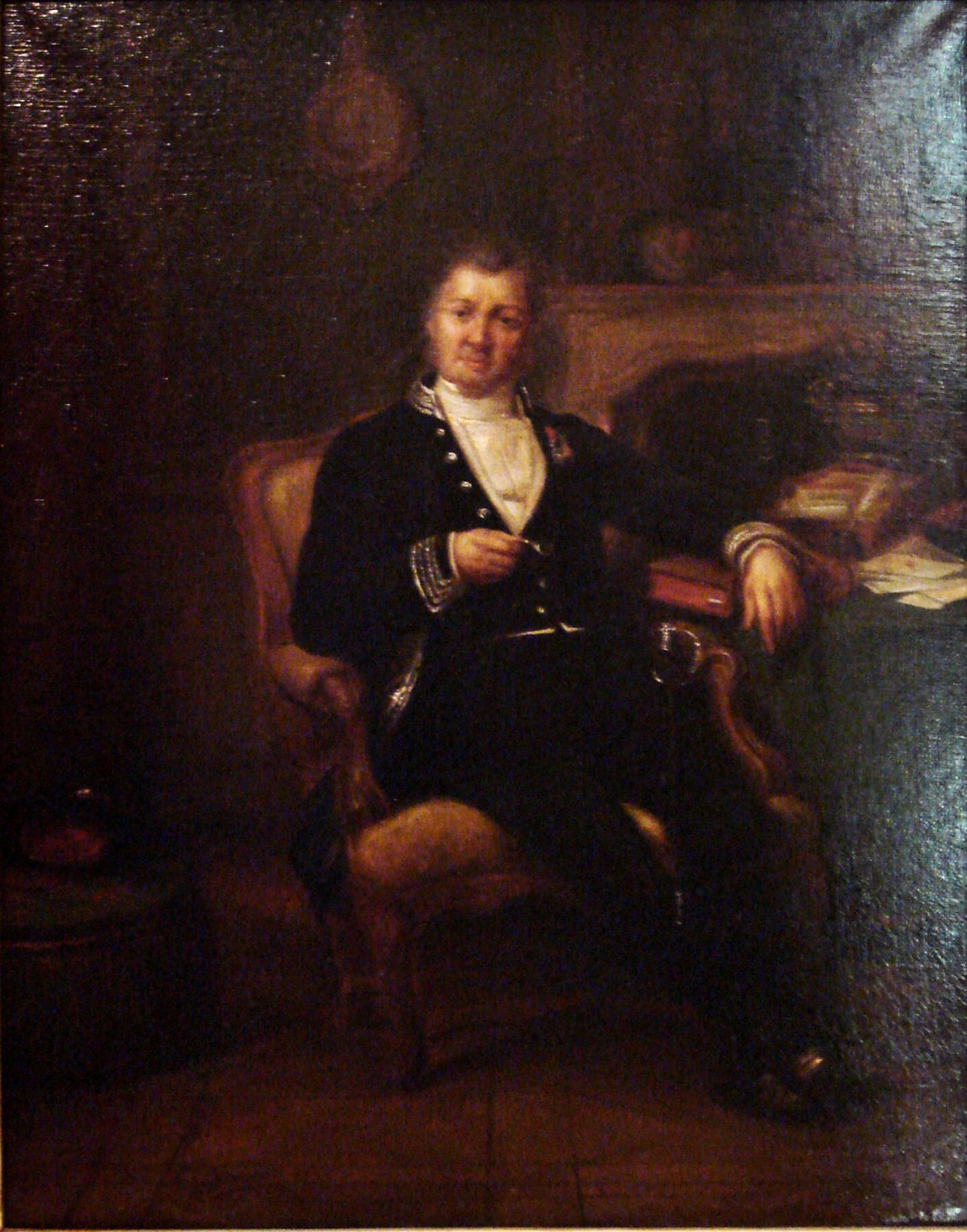
1855 portrait of Duperré by Claudius Jacquand

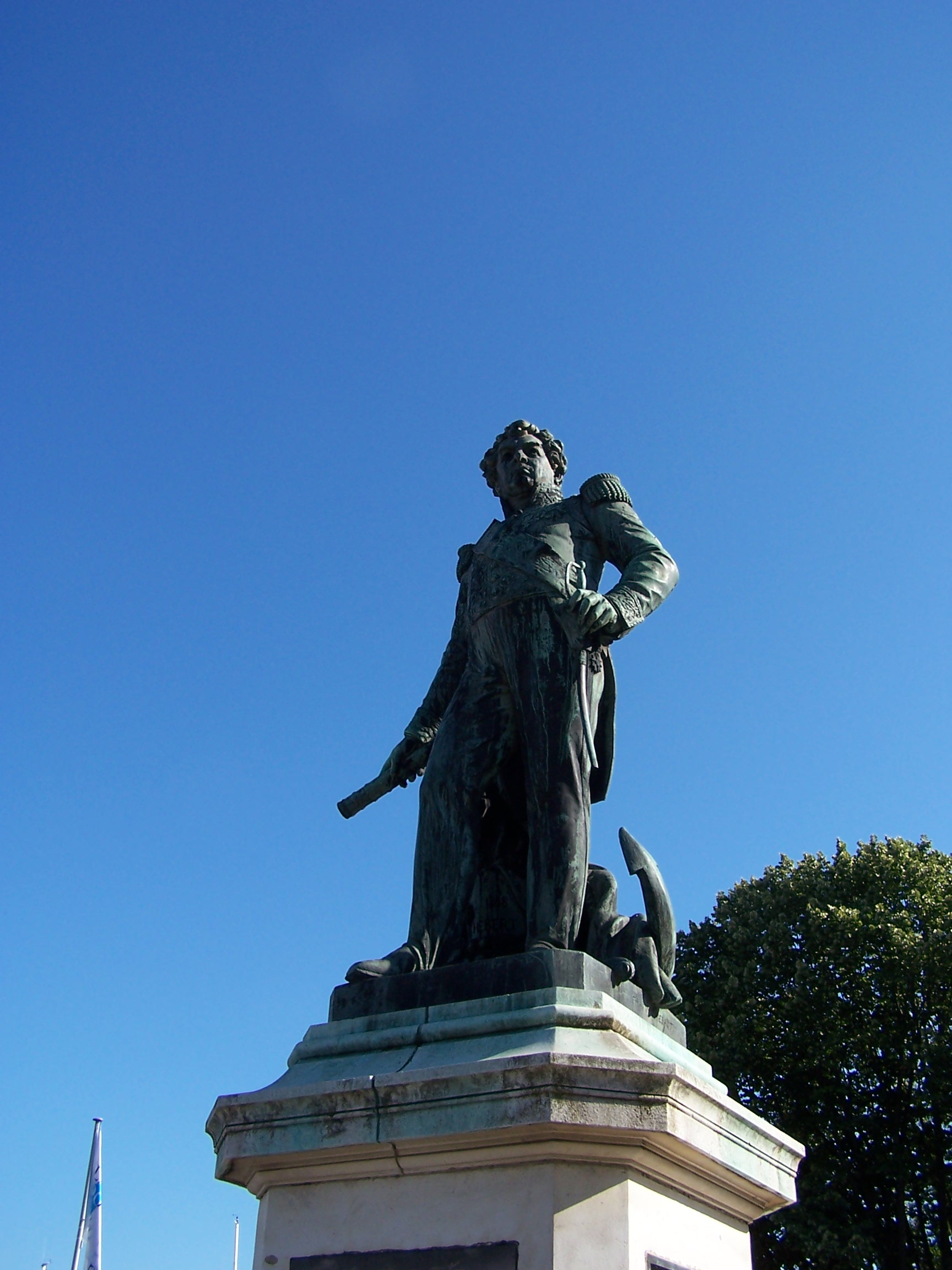
Statue of Duperré in La Rochelle

Duperré was born on 20 February 1775 in La Rochelle to Jean Augustin Duperré, counselor of the king and financer for war, and Marie-Gabrielle Prat-Desprez. He spent a few years with the Oratory of Saint Philip Neri at the Collège de Juilly, before enlisting at 16 on the Henri IV, a French East Indiaman.

== French Revolutionary and Napoleonic Wars ==
In November 1792, Duperré joined the French Navy at the beginning of the French Revolutionary Wars. He served against the Dutch and British aboard the corvette Maire-Guiton, and later aboard the frigate Tortu. In May 1796, he was made an auxiliary ensign aboard the Virginie. In June, he was captured by the British during a night fight. He was exchanged two years later and made a full rank ensign, taking command of the corvette Pélagie.

In 1804, he was made a ship-of-the-line lieutenant, and later assistant of the maritime prefect of Boulogne-sur-Mer. In 1806, he served off Brazil aboard the Vétéran, under Jérôme Bonaparte. Back to France, he was promoted to frigate captain on 28 September. In 1808, commanding the frigate Sirène, he led a troop convoy to Martinique; returning to France, he was intercepted by British blockaders off Lorient, and managed to escape by beaching his ship. Napoleon made him a ship-of-the-line captain and knight of the Légion d'honneur, before promoting him to Commodore. On 6 December 1810, Duperré was made Baron of the Empire.

Duperré was sent to Isle de France aboard the frigate Bellone, fighting several British ships in the process, notably the action of 3 July 1810. On 23 August 1810, he won the Battle of Grand Port, completely destroying a British squadron of four frigates. He was wounded in this battle, and the victory made its way on the Arc de Triomphe. In recognition, Duperré was promoted to counter admiral when he returned to France in September 1811. From 1812 to 1814, Duperré commanded the Italian and French naval forces in the Mediterranean and the Adriatic. In 1814, he unsuccessfully defended Venice against an Anglo-Austrian force and surrendered in April.

== Bourbon Restoration ==
Duperré was made Préfet maritime of Toulon during the Hundred Days, and was retired during the Bourbon Restoration. In 1818, he was brought back to active duty. He commanded the squadron which blockaded Cádiz during the war which reinstated Ferdinand VII of Spain on the throne. In October 1823, he was made vice-admiral, grand officier de la Légion d'honneur and Commander of the Order of Saint Louis in 1824. In 1827, he was made Préfet maritime of Brest and inspector of the 5th arrondissement militaire.

Though Duperré was critical towards the expedition against Algiers, Charles X made him commander of the fleet which ferried troops under Bourmont to depose the Algerian Regency. The fleet of the invasion of Algiers and shipwreck of Dellys was 103 warships strong, with 572 freighters ferrying 35 000 soldiers, 3 800 horses and 91 heavy guns. In recognition for his role, Duperré was made pair de France on 16 July 1830.

== July Monarchy ==
After the July Revolution, all pairages were cancelled as a whole. Duperré was reinstated pair de France by Louis-Philippe on 18 August 1830, and promoted to Admiral in March 1831. Then in Africa, Duperré was called back to France and made chief of the council of the Admiralty.

On 18 November 1834, Duperré became Naval Minister in Mortier's government. He retained the office in de Broglie's and Thiers' governments, and got out of office when Thiers' government collapsed on 16 September 1836. Duperré came back to office on 12 May 1839 in Soult's second government. In 1840, a budget project for the Duke of Nemours was rejected, which made the government collapse; Duperré then said: "The ministry has received a round shot in the belly, which has gone to hit the wood of the Crown." Duperré came back again to the ministry on 29 October 1840 in Soult's third government, until he retired for health reasons on 6 February 1843.

== Death and legacy ==
Duperré died on 2 November 1846 in Saint-Servan, Brittany. Admiral Jean Tupinier said a eulogy in the chamber of the pairs de France. He was buried in the Invalides in a national funeral. His name is carved on the Arc de Triomphe in Paris.

| Preceded by Charles, baron Dupin | Ministers of Marine and the Colonies; 18 November 1834 – 6 September 1836 | Succeeded by Claude Charles Marie du Campe de Rosamel |
| Preceded by Jean Marguerite Tupinier | Ministers of Marine and the Colonies; 12 May 1839 – 1 March 1840 | Succeeded by Albin Reine, baron Roussin |
| Preceded by Albin Reine, baron Roussin | Ministers of Marine and the Colonies; 29 October 1840 – 7 February 1843 | Succeeded by Albin Reine, baron Roussin |
