= Chilean ship Lautaro (1818) =

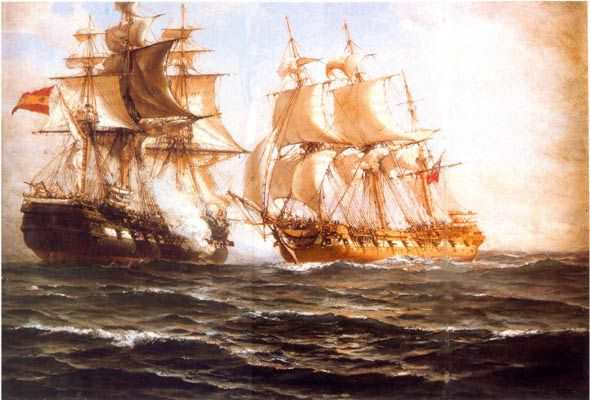
- Lautaro (right) fought against Esmeralda (left) off Valparaíso in 1818

History

Great Britain
- Name: Windham
- Owner: Sir Robert Wigram, later Joseph Andrews
- Operator: East India Company
- Route: England-India
- Builder: Perry, Wells & Green, Blackwall Shipyard
- Yard number: 110
- Launched: 3 November 1800
- Fate: Sold to Chile 1818

Chile
- Name: Lautaro
- Namesake: Mapuche military commander Lautaro
- Cost: 180,000 pesos
- Acquired: 5 April 1818
- Commissioned: April 1818
- Out of service: 27 September 1828
- Honours and awards: Capture of Reina María Isabel, Perla and San Miguel
- Fate: Sold as pontoon in Valparaíso, scrapped 1829

General characteristics
- Type: East Indiaman
- Tons burthen: 820, or 82347/94 or 878 (bm)
- Length: 146 ft 3 1/2 in (44.6 m) (overall); 118 ft 9 1/2 in (36.2 m) (keel)
- Beam: 36 ft 1 1/4 in (11.0 m)
- Depth of hold: 14 ft 9 1/2 in (4.5 m)
- Propulsion: sail
- Crew: East Indiaman: 100; Chilean Navy: 288
- Armament: East Indiaman: 26 × 18 and 6-pounder guns; Transport (1816):14 × 9-pounder guns; Chilean Navy: 42 guns

Lautaro was initially the British East Indiaman Windham, built by Perry, Wells & Green at the Blackwall Shipyard for the East India Company (EIC) and launched in 1800. She made seven voyages to India, Ceylon, and China for the EIC. In 1809–10, the French captured her twice, but the British also recaptured her twice. The Chilean Navy bought her in 1818 and she then served in the Chilean Navy, taking part in several actions during the liberation wars in Chile and Peru. From 1824 she was a training ship until she was sold in 1828.

== East India Company ==
Windham (sometimes listed as Wyndham) performed six voyages for the EIC between 31 March 1801 and 25 June 1817, sailing to India from England, and back. Because she sailed during wartime, her owners arranged for her to sail under a letter of marque, which gave her the right to take enemy vessels as prizes should the opportunity arise.

On 8 October 1798, the EIC accepted a tender by William Wilson of Windham of 820 tons (bm) for six voyages. The rate was £19 19s per ton if she carried kintledge, £20 19s without kintledge, and £9 14s 6d per surplus ton.

=== First voyage (1801-02) ===
Her first letter of marque was dated 14 January 1801 and gave the name of her captain as Thomas Grantham. Windham's first voyage was to China. She left Portsmouth on 31 March 1801 and reached Saint Helena on 10 June and Whampoa on 7 October. On her return leg she crossed the Second Bar on 21 January 1802, reached Saint Helena on 12 April, and The Downs on 12 June.

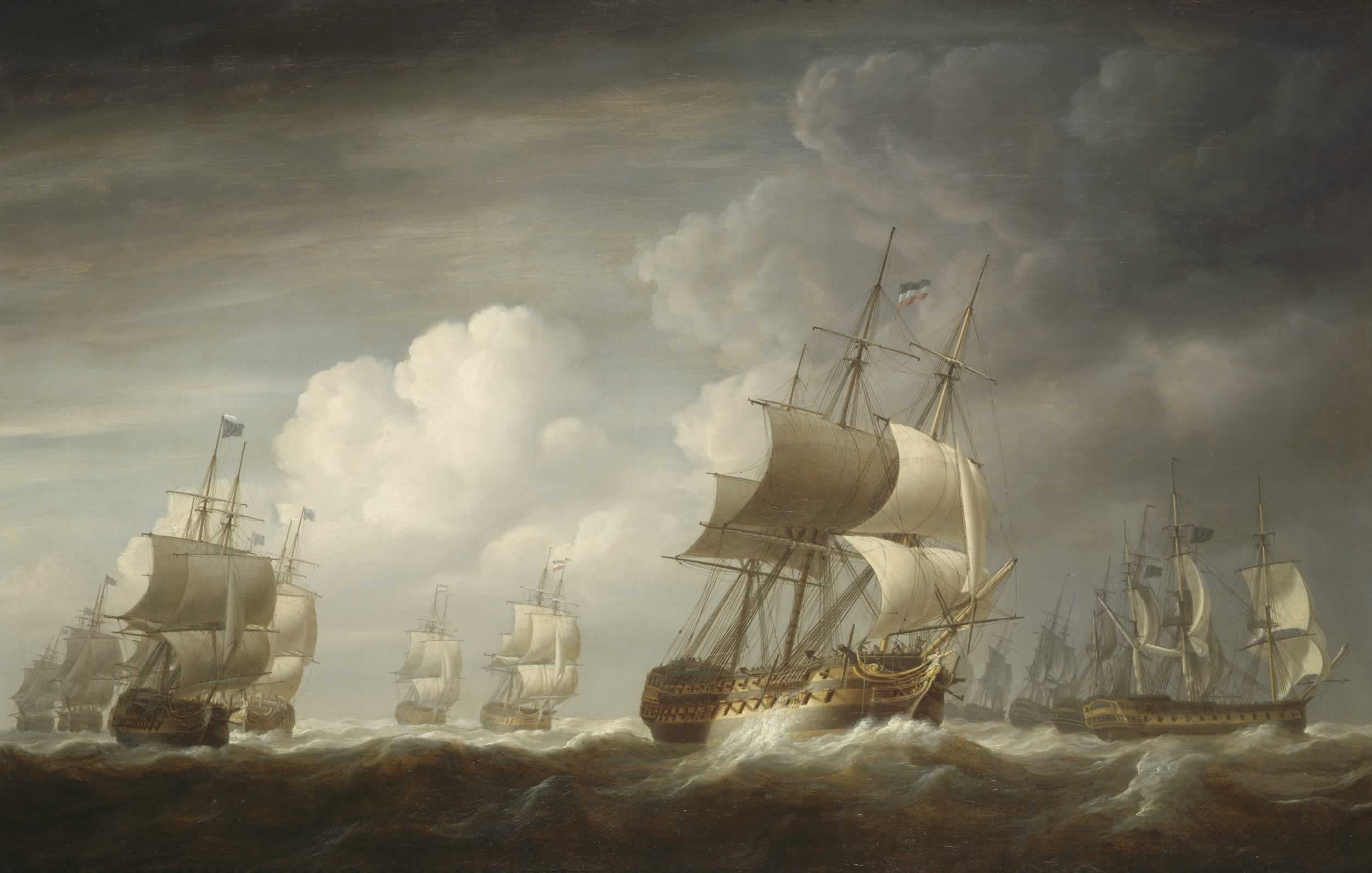
A fleet of East Indiamen at Sea, by Nicholas Pocock; it is believed to show the Indiamen Lord Hawkesbury, Worcester, Boddam, Fort William, Airly Castle, Lord Duncan, Ocean, Henry Addington, Carnatic, Hope, and Windham returning from China in 1802

=== Second voyage (1803-1804) ===
With the outbreak of the Napoleonic Wars in mid-1803, Graham received a new letter of marque dated 2 July 1803. This voyage took Windham to Madras and Bengal. She left The Downs on 11 February 1803 and reached Tincomallee on 16 June and Madras on 27 June. From these, she sailed up and down the Indian coast, reaching Masulipatam on 7 August, Vizagapatam on 9 August, and Diamond Harbour on 21 August. Coming out of Calcutta she reached Kedgeree on 18 September and Madras on 16 October. She then returned to Diamond Harbour on 13 December. On the journey back to Britain, she was back at Saugor on 5 January 1804, Vizagapatam on 27 January and Madras on 21 February. Windham was at Saint Helena between 24 March and 28 June, and reached The Downs on 9 October.

Windham had travelled from St Helena in convoy with the East Indiamen City of London, Ceylon, and Calcutta, two vessels from the South Seas, Lively and Vulture, and Rolla, which had transported convicts to New South Wales. (Note: Lively was a French ship launched in 1787 but captured in 1796. She was now working as a South Seas whaler under the command of Captain Magnus Smith and under ownership of David Bennett.) Their escort was HMS Courageaux. On the way the convoy ran into severe weather with the result that the Prince of Wales, which had also left St Helena with the rest, foundered with the loss of all on board; this had been her maiden voyage.

=== Third voyage (1805-06) ===
She received a third letter on 26 January 1805 that named John Stewart as her captain. Stewart sailed her on her third, fourth and fifth voyages. Her third voyage took Windham to Madras and China. She left Portsmouth on 8 March 1805 and reached Madras on 21 July. From there she reached Penang on 26 March, Malacca on 15 September, and Whampoa on 20 December. She crossed the Second Bar on 28 February 1806, and again reached Penang on 26 March. From there she was at Saint Helena on 17 June and The Downs by 14 August.

=== Fourth voyage (1807-08) ===
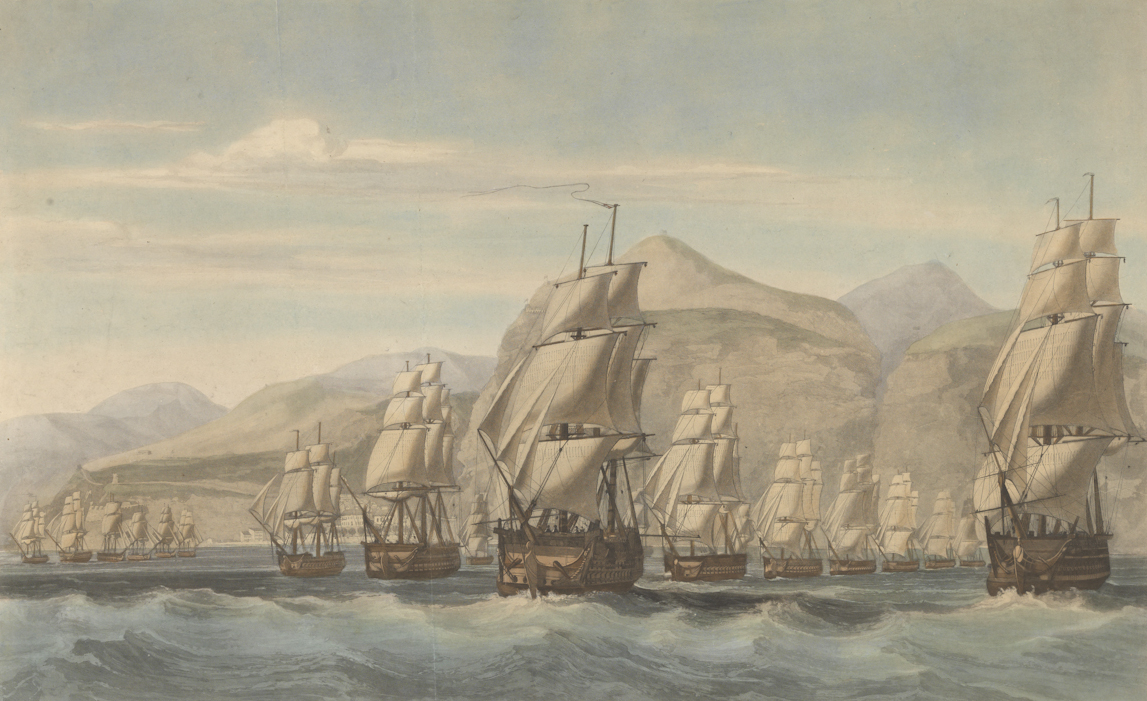
The Windham leading an East Indiaman fleet sailing from St Helena, under convoy of His Majesty's ship Monmouth in 1808

Windham's fourth voyage took her to Bengal and Benkulen. She left Portsmouth on 21 June 1807 and reached Diamond Harbour on 15 November and Kidderpore on 9 December. On her next leg she reached Saugor on 31 January 1808 and Benkulen on 28 March. Between 20 April and 17 June she was at Saint Helena, and she returned to The Downs on 14 August.

=== Fifth voyage (1809-11) - capture and recapture ===
It was on Windham's fifth voyage that the French captured her twice, and the British recaptured her twice. Windham left Portsmouth on 7 July 1809 for Bengal. She reached Madeira on 19 July.

During the Mauritius campaign of 1809–1811 the French frigate Vénus captured her and two other Indiamen Charlton and United Kingdom in the action of 18 November 1809. In the action the British lost four men killed and two wounded.

The British frigate HMS Magicienne under Captain Lucius Curtis recaptured her on 29 December. In February 1810 Windham was at the Cape of Good Hope. Stewart and her crew rejoined her, having arrived there in a cartel.

Windham resumed her journey, only to fall afoul of the French frigate Bellone near Johanna Island at the action of 3 July 1810. HMS Sirius recaptured Windham at the Battle of Grand Port on 21 August 1810 and sent her with a prize crew to Île Bourbon. There Windham received a new captain, Joseph Lautour, and crew. Some of her guns were used to arm Emma.

She and another recaptured Indiaman, Ceylon, arrived back in Britain in August 1811. Windham arrived in The Downs on 8 August 1811. Ceylon brought with her a cargo from Isle Bourbon and Windham one from Isle de France.

=== Sixth voyage ===
There is some ambiguity about the Windham's sixth voyage for the EIC as the British Library does not hold the logbooks. One report has her sailing between 5 August 1813 and 20 August 1815 to Botany Bay and Ceylon. That report names her master as Captain Clarke.

A Windham carried the 46th Regiment of Foot to New South Wales. Windham, Blythe, master, General Hewett, and Wanstead left England on 23 August 1813, initially under escort by HMS Akbar. They arrived in Sydney on 11 February 1814. Windham left on 14 April, bound for Calcutta.

On 16 August 1814, Windham ran on shore after leaving the dock at Bengal. She had not suffered material damage and was gotten off on the next tide. She then returned to dock. Windham, Clarke, master, arrived back at Gravesend on 14 August 1815.

=== Seventh voyage (1816-1817) ===
On 25 October 1815 the EIC accepted a tender from Thomas Price, esq. for Windham, of 823 tons (bm), for one voyage at a rate of £25 10s per ton for a direct voyage to China, or £27 10s for one to China circuitously.

Her captain for the voyage was Joseph Andrews. Because this voyage took place after the end of the Napoleonic Wars Windham did not have a letter of marque. She left the Downs on 21 April 1816 and reached Penang and then Malacca on 7 September. She reached Whampoa on 11 October. She left China, crossing the Second Bar on 10 January 1817, reached St Helena on 18 March, and the Downs on 23 May.

The EIC then sold her to Joseph Andrews.

== Chilean career ==
José Antonio Álvarez Condarco, agent of the Chilean government in London, arranged the purchase of the ship and the recruitment of unemployed naval officers and crew. (Note: The British government generally stipulated that buyers of frigates or larger warships that the Admiralty was selling undertake to break them up within 12 months of the date of purchase or forfeit the bonds they had posted. When the Chileans wanted to create larger warships they had to make do with Indiamen such as Windham. They were permitted to buy the Cruizer-class brig-sloop Hecate.) Windham arrived at Valparaíso on 5 March 1818 and the government paid 180,000 pesos for the ship. She was refitted with 44 guns, renamed Lautaro, and given a crew of Chilean and foreign seamen. A month later she went to sea under the command of George O'Brien, a former Royal Navy officer.

On 26–27 April 1818 she fought against the Spanish frigate Esmeralda and brigantine Pezuela outside Valparaiso. Although the attack on Esmeralda cost Captain O'Brien and his boarding party their lives, Lautaro did succeed in lifting the Spanish blockade of Valparaíso. Later that year Lautaro, under the American, Captain Charles Wooster, was in the squadron under Commodore Blanco Encalada that surprised the relieving Spanish fleet at Talcahuano on 28 October. Lautaro and San Martín captured the Spanish frigate Reina María Isabel (later the Chilean frigate O'Higgins), the Perla, and the San Miguel.

In the first half of 1819, after Lord Cochrane had taken command of the Chilean navy, Lautaro, under Captain Martin Guise, took part in the blockade of Callao, though a planned cutting out expedition against the Spanish fleet in the harbour was not successful. On 7 November, returning to Peru, Lautaro and Galverino successfully attacked the shipping in the defended port of Pisco. In 1820 she participated in the Freedom Expedition of Perú, culminating in the successful cutting out at Callao of the Spanish flagship Esmeralda by Cochrane and Guise on 5 November.

From 1821 Lautaro was commanded by Paul Delano, Guise having been transferred to the captured Esmeralda, now Valdivia. During a period of considerable unrest on Chilean Navy vessels due to lack of pay, Lautaro was involved in the seizing by Cochrane of the Peruvian schooner Sacramento. The liberator José de San Martín had sent Sacramento to Ancón Bay with the entire currency of the State Treasury and the mint at Lima. Lautaro returned to Valparaiso, and in mid-1822 was still in need of extensive repairs. Lautaro was able to sail later in 1822 to recover Valdivia although, on 23 October in Talcahuano, the crew mutinied against Captain Wooster, who had returned to Chilean service and to his former ship that year. In January 1823 Wooster took her to blockade and attack the island of Chiloé, the last stronghold of Spanish royalists.

In late 1823–early 1824 Lautaro participated in an unsuccessful expedition to Peru. In addition to Lautaro, the expedition comprised the armed schooners Moctezuma and Mercedes, and the transports Ceres, Esther (of Liverpool, Davis, master), Santa Rosa, and Sesostris.

In 1824 Lautaro became the Chilean Navy's Naval academy (Academia Náutica) at Valparaiso.

On 27 September 1828 she was ordered to be sold, but with no bidders at auction she was converted into a pontoon. She was broken up in 1829.

== Gallery ==
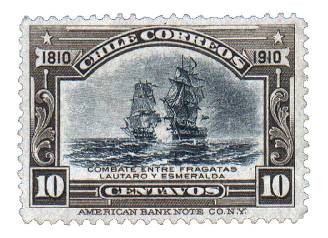
Chile's Lautaro fought Spain's Esmeralda in 1818 (stamp of 1910)

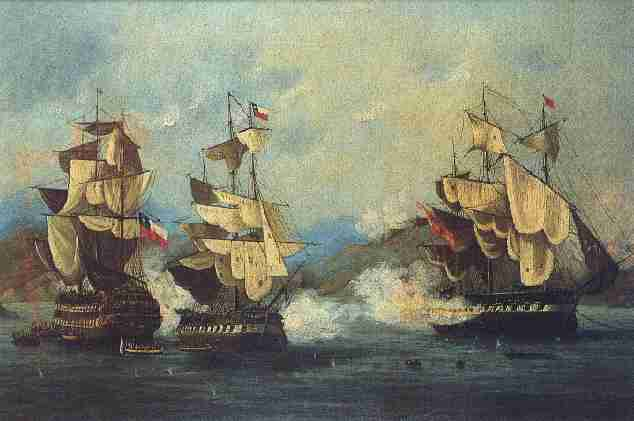
Capture of the Reina María Isabel in Talcahuano (1818)

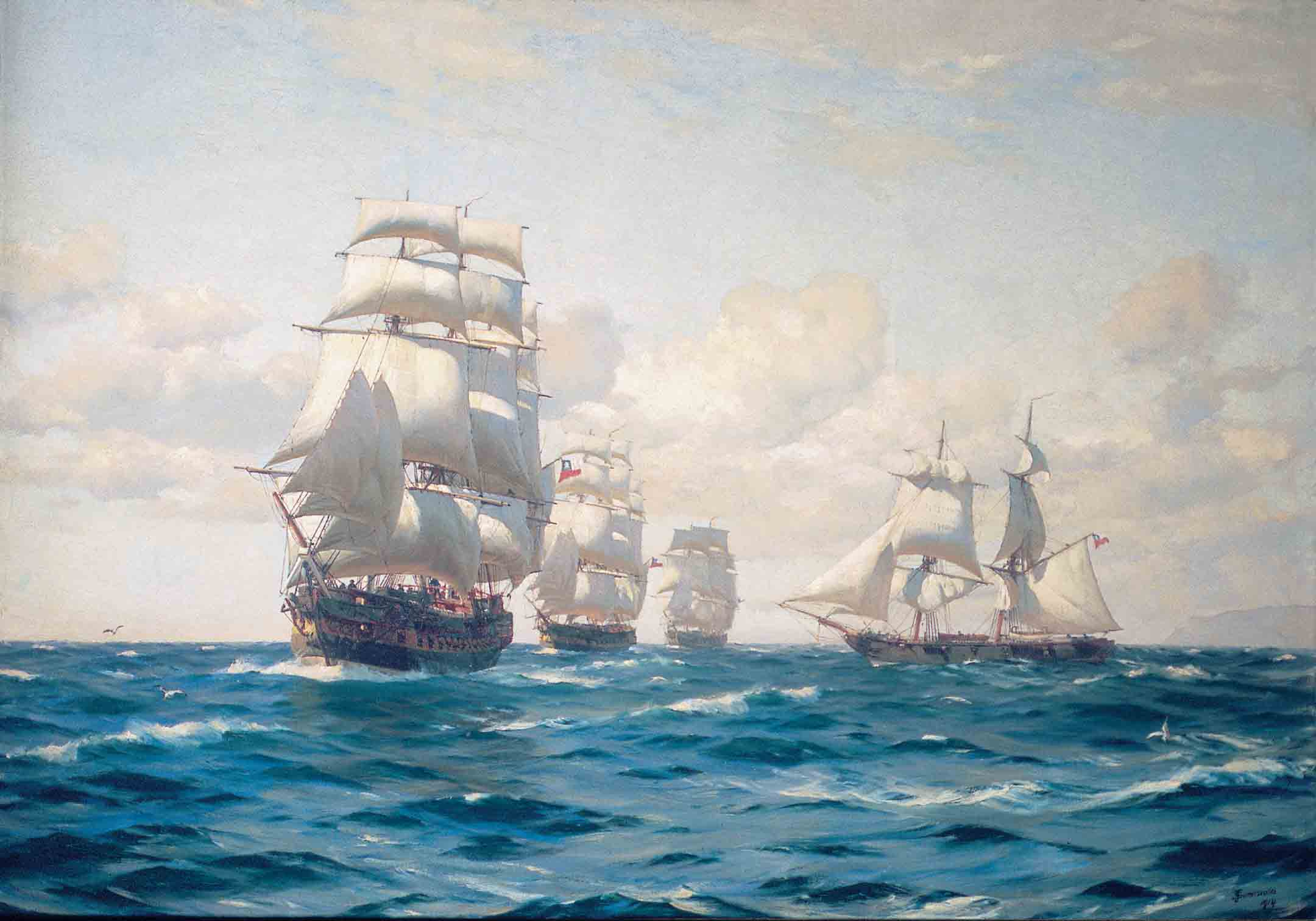
The Chilean Navy sails to Perú in 1821, in a painting by Thomas Somerscales (Lautaro is 2nd from right)
