= Charlton (1798 EIC ship) =

History

Great Britain
- Name: Charlton
- Owner: EIC voyages 1-5:Sir William Leighton; EIC voyage 6:Martin Lindsay.
- Builder: Humble, Liverpool
- Launched: 6 December 1798

France
- Acquired: 18 November 1809 by capture
- Captured: 3 December 1810

United Kingdom
- Name: Charlton
- Acquired: 1811 by purchase of a prize
- Fate: Wrecked 1812

General characteristics
- Tons burthen: 818, or 81811/94, or 871 (bm)
- Length: Overall:146 ft 0 in (44.5 m); Keel:118 ft 6 1/2 in (36.1 m)
- Beam: 36 ft 0 1/2 in (11.0 m)
- Depth of hold: 14 ft 9 in (4.5 m)
- Complement: 1799:120; 1801:120; 1805:110; 1809:110
- Armament: 1799:26 × 18-pounder guns + 6 wall pieces; 1801:26 × 18-pounder guns; 1805:26 × 18-pounder guns; 1809:26 × 18-pounder guns

Charlton was launched in 1798 in Liverpool as an East Indiaman for the British East India Company (EIC). She made five voyages to India for the EIC. A French naval squadron captured her in 1809 on her sixth voyage and she became a prison ship at Mauritius until the Royal Navy recaptured her at the end of 1810. She became a country ship, trading east of the Cape of Good Hope, and was lost in the Red Sea in 1812.

== Career ==
=== 1st EIC voyage (1799–1800) ===
Captain Thomas Welladvice acquired a letter of marque on 16 April 1799. He sailed from Portsmouth on 18 June 1799, bound for Bengal and Madras. Charlton arrived at Diamond Harbour on 4 November. Homeward bound she was at Saugor on 23 January 1800, and Madras on 15 March. She reached St Helena on 8 July and arrived back at Long Reach on 28 September.

=== 2nd EIC voyage (1801–1802) ===
Captain John Altham Cumberlege acquired a letter of marque on 1 February 1801. He sailed from Portsmouth on 31 March 1801, bound for Madras and Bengal. Charlton reached Madras on 26 July and arrived at Diamond Harbour on 23 August. Homeward bound, she was at Saugor on 13 December. She was at Vizagapatam on 12 January 1802, Coninga on 16 January, Narsipore on 18 January, and Madras on 26 January. She reached St Helena on 14 May and arrived back at Long Reach on 15 July.

=== 3rd EIC voyage (1803–1804) ===
Captain Thomas Welladvice sailed from Portsmouth 24 March 1803, bound for Bengal. Charlton arrived at Diamond Harbour on 7 July. Homeward bound, she was at Saugor on 6 November, reached St Helena on 8 March 1804, and arrived back at Long Reach on 30 May.

=== 4th EIC voyage (1805–1806) ===
Captain George Wood acquired a letter of marque on 5 February 1805. He sailed from Portsmouth on 8 March, bound for Madras and Bengal. Charlton reached Madras on 17 July. She was at Masulipatam on 24 August and arrived at Diamond Barbour on 31 August. Homeward bound, she was at Saugor on 30 November, Vizagapatam on 30 December, Coninga on 3 January 1806, Narsipore on 12 January, and Madras on 16 January. She was then at Colombo on 21 February and Point de Galle on 3 March, reached St Helena on 15 May, and arrived back at Long Reach on 22 July.

=== 5th EIC voyage (1807–1808) ===
Captain Wood sailed from Portsmouth on 18 April 1807, bound for Bombay. Charlton reached Bombay on 1 September. She then made a circuit to Goa (28 October), Tellicherry (4 November), Calicut (12 November), and Quilon (22 November), before returning to Bombay on 25 December. Homeward bound, she was at Colombo on 9 March 1808, reached St Helena on 12 June, and arrived back at Long Reach on 17 August.

=== 6th EIC voyage (1809–capture) ===
Captain Charles Mortlock acquired a letter of marque on 5 June 1809. He sailed from Portsmouth 7 July 1809, bound for Madeira, Madras, and Bengal. A French squadron captured her and two other East Indiamen on 18 November at 6°30′N 90°30′E.

French Commodore Jacques Hamelin, raided across the Bay of Bengal in 1809 with his squadron and achieved local superiority, capturing numerous merchant ships and minor warships. On 18 November 1809, three ships of Hamelin's squadron, the frigates Vénus and Manche, and the brig Créole, encountered and captured Charlton, Windham, and United Kingdom.

The French took their prizes to Mauritius though the Royal Navy recaptured Windham on the way. The EIC stated the value of its cargo on Charlton as £27,985.

=== Recapture ===
On 29 November 1810 the British attacked Île de France. On 3 December the French surrendered.

Lloyd's List published on 15 February 1811 a list of all the vessels captured, military and civilian. Among the prizes was the "East Indiaman Charlton (prison ship) of 30 guns and 900 tons".

== Later career and fate ==
After her recapture, Charlton became a country ship, that is, a vessel that traded east of the Cape of Good Hope.

Lloyd's List reported in May 1813 that Charlton had been wrecked in the Red Sea.
