= Action of 18 November 1809 =

1809 battle of the Mauritius campaign of 1809–1811

- Part of the Mauritius campaign of 1809–1811
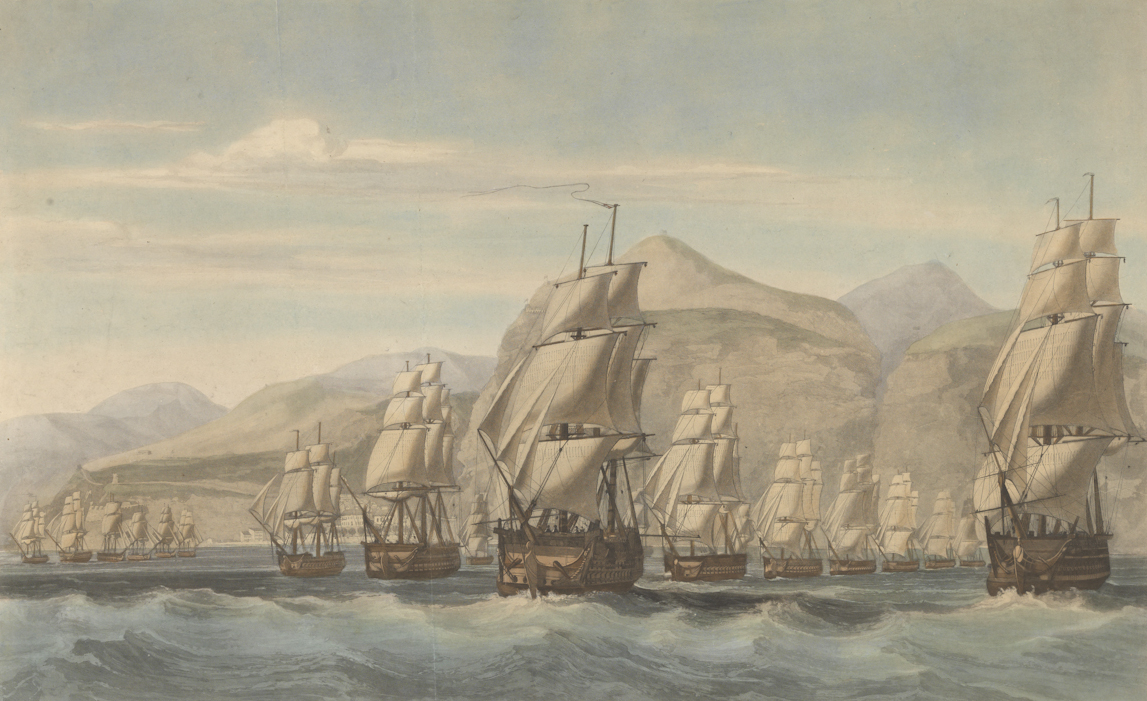
- Windham (centre), one of the ships involved in the action
Date	18 November 1809
Location	Bay of Bengal, Indian Ocean
Result	French victory

Belligerents
France	East India Company

Commanders and leaders
Jacques Hamelin	John Stewart

Strength
2 frigates 1 brig	3 merchant ships

Casualties and losses
None	4 killed 2 wounded 3 merchant ships captured

The action of 18 November 1809 was the major engagement of a six-month cruise in the Indian Ocean by a French navy squadron during the Napoleonic Wars. Under Commodore Jacques Félix Emmanuel Hamelin, the squadron engaged in commerce raiding across the Bay of Bengal. Hamelin's squadron achieved local superiority, capturing several British merchant ships and destroying a factory of the East India Company (EIC). On 18 November 1809, two frigates and a brig of Hamelin's squadron encountered a convoy of three EIC East Indiamen bound for British India.

Windham, the largest East Indiaman of the convoy, took advantage of a disrupted French formation to attack the frigate Manche. The two ships duelled for an hour before Manche disengaged and Windham fled. The other two East Indiamen declined to join the action and offered only token resistance to stronger French warships before surrendering. Windham evaded a French pursuit for five days before being captured by Hamelin's flagship, Vénus. The French immediately began transporting their prizes back to the colony of Isle de France.

A month after the battle, Hamelin's squadron encountered a tropical cyclone that heavily damaged several ships. Vénus survived with the help of the British prisoners she was carrying, who helped bring the ship safely to port. With the squadron scattered after the storm, Windham was recaptured by British frigate HMS Magicienne within a few miles of Isle de France; the other French ships and their two prizes successfully reached the colony. The crew of Windham were subsequently released in recognition of their assistance during the cyclone. The action was one of three losses of EIC convoys which prompted the Royal Navy to substantially increase its presence in the Indian Ocean by 1810.

== Background ==
Following the 1805 Battle of Trafalgar, the Royal Navy held command of the sea around Europe. The French Imperial Navy's remaining ships of the line were blockaded in their ports, though its frigates could slip away to engage in commerce raiding. Britain's economy relied heavily upon its maritime trade routes, which proved difficult for the Royal Navy to defend. The British East India Company's (EIC) maritime trade with India was particularly profitable and was conducted with large armed merchantmen known as East Indiamen. These ships had enough resilience, firepower and crew to fight off pirates or small naval vessels, but were not warships and unable to match frigates in combat.

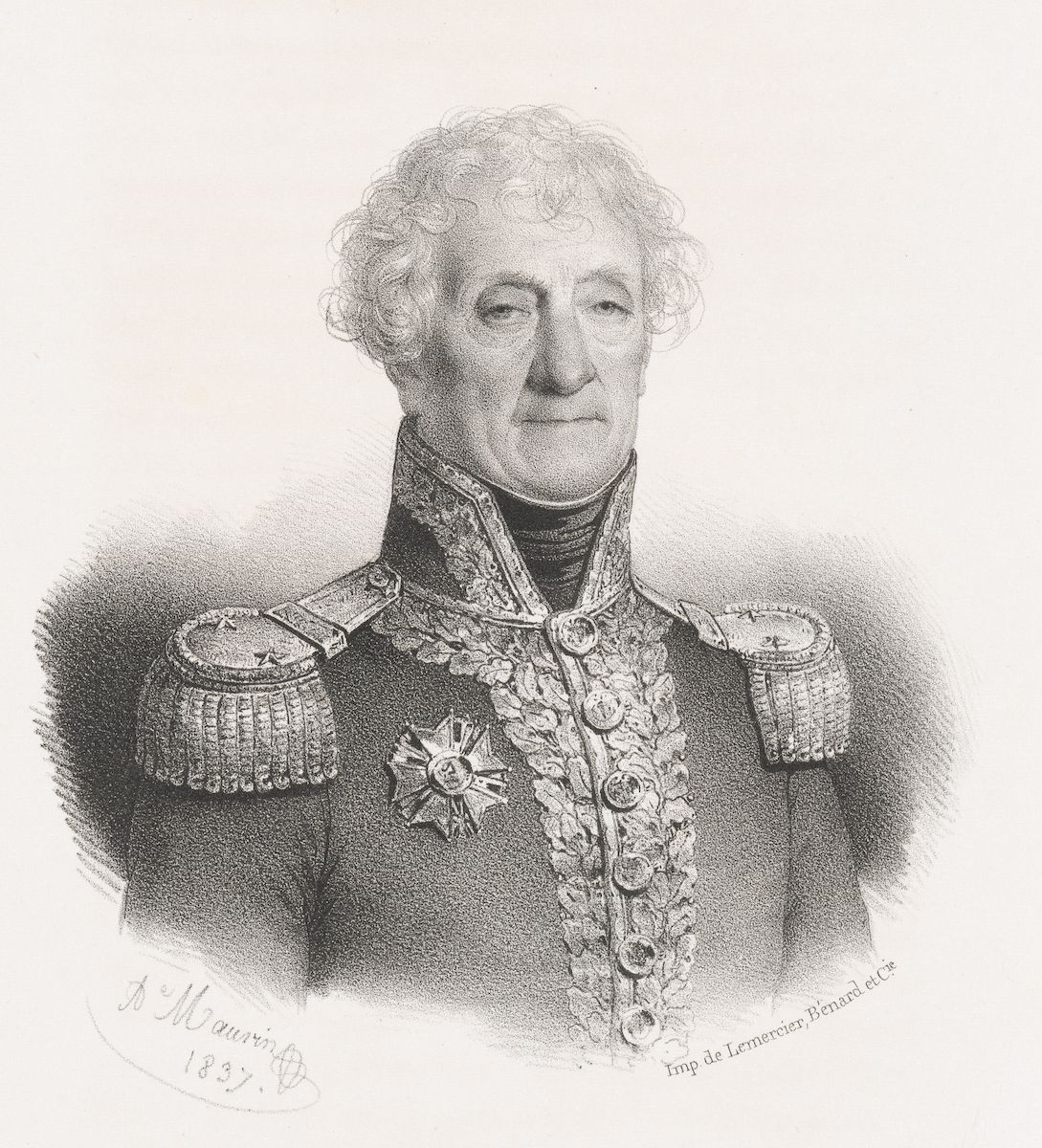
Jacques Hamelin, the French commander at the action

In late 1808, the French navy dispatched a squadron of four frigates under Commodore Jacques Hamelin from France to attack British trade routes in the East Indies. Their goal was to damage the British economy and force the Royal Navy to send more ships to the Indian Ocean, thereby weakening their presence elsewhere. Hamelin was a skilled officer with substantial experience in frigate actions and commerce raiding. The ships were to be maintained and supplied from the French colonies of Isle de France and Isle Bonaparte, both of which were in the western Indian Ocean. These colonies were thousands of miles from India and surrounded by open ocean, forcing Hamelin to sail substantial distances to find his targets.

After arriving in the Indian Ocean, Hamelin dispersed his frigates in the Bay of Bengal, ordering them to hunt British merchantmen. In the action of 31 May 1809, the frigate Caroline intercepted a convoy of British East Indiamen. After a brief show of resistance, one East Indiamen escaped and two others were captured and brought to Isle Bonaparte. British warships in the region were under the command of Admiral Albemarle Bertie at the Cape of Good Hope Station. In response to news of the French raiders, Bertie assembled a frigate squadron under Commodore Josias Rowley, ordering him to blockade the two French colonies and reconnoitre them for weaknesses that could be exploited in a future invasion. On 21 September, Rowley ordered a raid on Saint-Paul which captured Caroline and her two prizes along with burning several warehouses.

=== Hamelin's cruise and Stewart's convoy ===
In July 1809, Hamelin departed Isle de France in the frigate Vénus, accompanied by the frigate Manche (under Captain Jean Dornal de Guy) and the brig Créole. Both frigates carried at least 40 cannons with Créole carrying 14. All three were crewed by a full complement of experienced sailors reinforced by unemployed men stranded on Isle de France due to a British blockade. The frigate Bellone departed a month later and operated separately. Hamelin led his small squadron towards the Bay of Bengal. On the way there, Vénus captured the EIC armed ship Orient on 26 July. Hamelin then turned east in search of more British shipping to attack, capturing several small merchantmen off the Nicobar Islands. He then turned south towards the small EIC factory in Tappanooly, Sumatra. On 10 October, the squadron attacked Tappanooly, capturing its small British population and destroying the factory. Hamelin then turned north back towards the Bay of Bengal.

Months earlier, a convoy of three East British Indiamen – Windham under Captain John Stewart, Charlton under Captain Charles Mortlock and United Kingdom under Captain William D'Esterre – departed England on a voyage to Calcutta, with Stewart in overall command. They were to pick up a valuable cargo of trade goods in India before returning to England. On this outwards journey, their main cargo was over 200 passengers, primarily recruits for the Presidency armies of the EIC. The convoy had cargo capacities of approximately 800 tons burthen. They each carried between 20 and 30 small cannons but were not warships; their crews were not trained to military standards and their guns were not as powerful as those carried on naval vessels. A large proportion of the crews were also lascars, who were considered unreliable in combat. On 11 November, these ships encountered the British sloop-of-war HMS Rattlesnake, which warned them that French warships were operating in the area. Stewart began rehearsing Windham's gunnery in case he should meet them.

== Battle ==
At 06:00 on 18 November 1809, with the sailing season almost at an end, Hamelin sighted Stewart's convoy travelling northwards and gave chase. Ship for ship, the East Indiamen were outclassed by the French warships, which were faster, stronger and better trained for military action. In convoy, however, the British were still a tough target which could damage Hamelin's ships, which were thousands of miles from a friendly port. Four years earlier, at the Battle of Pulo Aura, a British convoy of 29 East Indiamen had driven off a superior French squadron by pretending to be ships of the line. However, that ruse had been widely reported on both sides, and so was unlikely to work again.

The French squadron became disorganised in their initial pursuit of the East Indiamen, with Manche falling substantially to leeward of Vénus and Créole. Seeing this, Stewart decided to concentrate the fire of his three vessels in an attack on Manche, hoping to cause enough damage to drive the frigate away and prevent Vénus from attacking. Signalling his intentions to Mortlock and D'Esterre, Stewart turned towards Vénus and bore down on her. Hamelin, realising the threat to his scattered squadron, signalled for his ships to join up. Given the wind direction, it was obvious that Windham would reach Manche before the French ships could unite.

By 08:00, it was clear that Stewart's plan was going to fail: Charlton and United Kingdom had not joined his attack, falling far behind Windham as Mortlock and D'Esterre deliberately checked the advance towards the French. Although Stewart now faced a superior foe alone, he had no option but to continue the attack: his ship was now too close to attempt to flee from Manche. De Guy ordered his crew to open fire at 09:30, repeatedly hitting Windham as she approached. Stewart, aware of his gunners' poor accuracy, held fire until his ship was as close as she could get to the more nimble French ship. When Windham finally opened fire the results were disappointing: the entire broadside fell short of the French ship. The more manoeuvrable Manche now approached Windham at close range, with the two ships firing at one another for over an hour. The other two East Indiamen did not move to support Windham, instead firing occasional shots at extreme range to no effect.

Hamelin ordered Manche to leave the battered Windham and rejoin the rest of the French squadron. De Guy pulled his ship away at 12:00; Stewart used the break in the action to begin rudimentary repairs. Hamelin sent Manche and Créole after the slower Charlton and United Kingdom while ordering Vénus to close with Windham. Stewart now decided that the battle was hopeless; with the agreement of his officers, he abandoned the other two ships and attempted to escape alone. Manche and Créole rapidly overhauled and captured Charlton and United Kingdom, both of which made no attempt to escape and surrendered after a token resistance. However, Vénus struggled to catch Windham, as Stewart threw all non-essential stores overboard in an effort to make his ship lighter and faster. The two ships became separated from the other vessels and continued the chase for five days. At 10:30 on 22 November Hamelin finally caught Windham, which surrendered.

== Aftermath ==
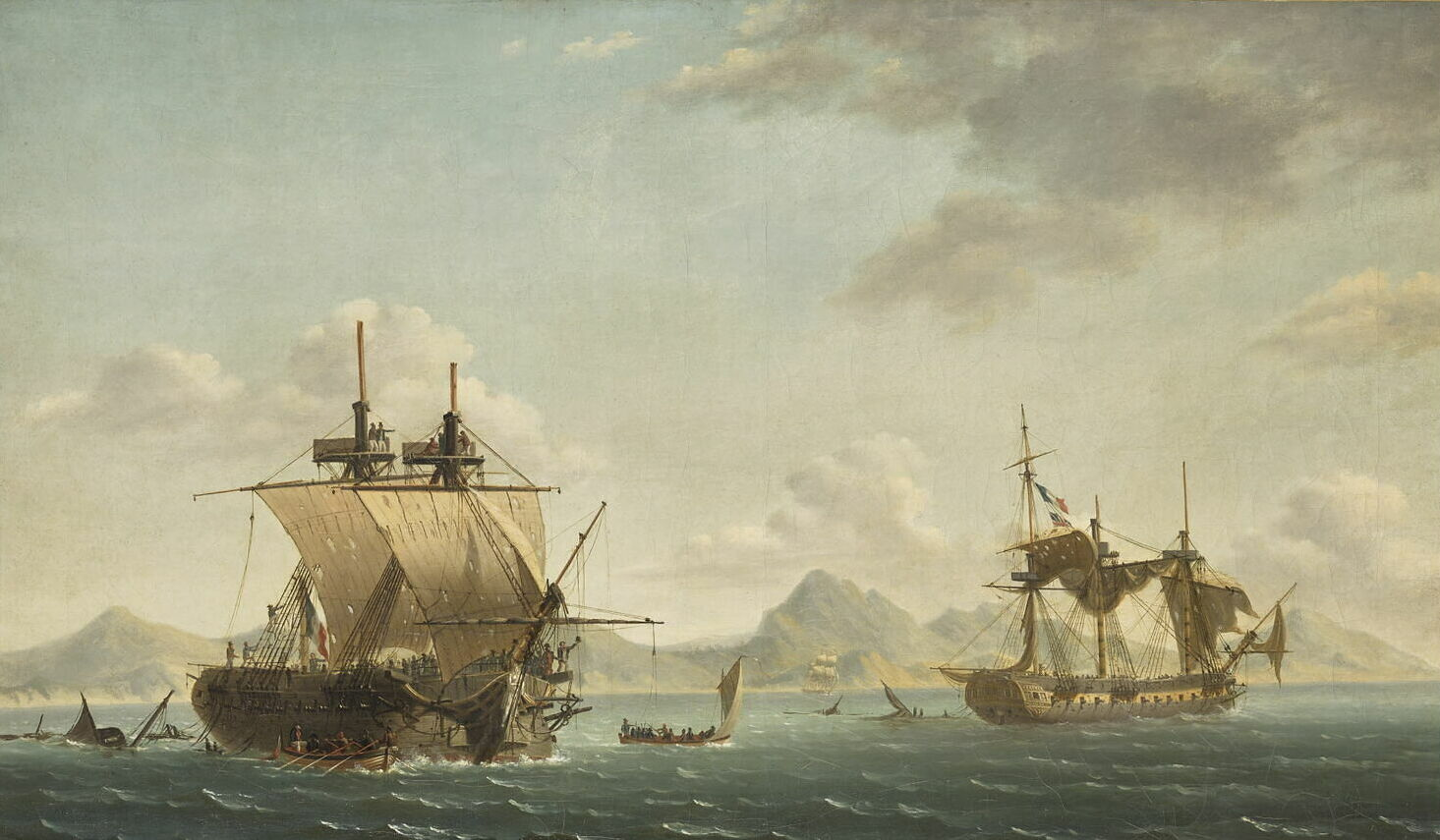
The action of 18 September 1810, where Hamelin was captured by the British

Casualties in the battle were minimal, with the British losing four killed and two wounded while the French sustained no casualties at all. Bellone, under Captain Guy-Victor Duperré, sailed independently of Hamelin's squadron and in the northern Bay of Bengal captured the British corvette HMS Victor on 2 November and the Portuguese Navy frigate Minerva on 22 November before sailing back to Isle de France. To the south, Hamelin and de Guy reunited with their prizes on 6 December and decided to set sail for Isle de France as the cyclone season, in which ships in the Indian Ocean were at serious risk of foundering due to tropical cyclones, was fast approaching.

On 19 December, a cyclone struck the French squadron. Windham and Vénus were separated from the others, with Manche marshalling the remaining ships and continuing southwards. Windham's prize crew were able to regain control of their ship and continued on to Isle de France alone, but Vénus was struck by an even larger cyclone on 27 December, losing all three topmasts. The French crew panicked as the storm began, and refused to attend to the sails or even close the hatches, resulting in the ship almost foundering due to the large amounts of water that poured in. In desperation, Hamelin called Stewart to his cabin and requested that his men save the ship but demanded that he give his word that they would not attempt to escape or seize the frigate. Stewart refused to give any such guarantee but agreed to help repair the damage and bring the ship to safety. After securing the weapons lockers aboard, Hamelin agreed and Stewart and his men cut away the wrecked masts and pumped the water out of the hold, repairing the ship so that she was able to continue her journey without fear of foundering.

On 31 December, the battered Vénus docked in the Rivière Noire District. Stewart and his men, who never had an opportunity to escape, were marched to Port Louis, where they witnessed the arrival of Manche accompanied by Créole, Charlton and United Kingdom on 1 January 1810. For their services, Stewart and his fellow prisoners were later released and allowed to sail to the Cape Colony. There, they discovered Windham, which had failed to arrive at Isle de France. Although her prize crew had retained control of the ship following the storm, they had been sighted, chased, and seized within sight of Isle de France on 29 December by the newly arrived British frigate HMS Magicienne under Captain Lucius Curtis. Bellone and her prizes arrived at Port Louis on 2 January, having slipped past Rowley's blockade during a period of calm weather.

The battle on 18 November was the second occasion in 1809 in which a convoy of British East Indiamen was destroyed; the action of 31 May 1809 was the first, and another would be lost in the action of 3 July 1810 on the following year. These losses were exceptionally heavy, especially when combined with the 12 East Indiamen wrecked during 1809, and would eventually lead to a massive buildup of British forces in the region in late 1810. Despite the French victory, Vénus was never again able to operate independently. Hamelin was needed during 1810 to operate against the powerful British frigate squadrons that returned in the spring to harass his ships and to defend against Britain's planned invasions of Isle de France and Isle Bonaparte using troops stationed on Rodrigues. He was ultimately unable to stymy the British and was eventually captured in the action of 18 September 1810, a personal engagement with Rowley on HMS Boadicea.
