= United Kingdom (1801 EIC ship) =

History

United Kingdom
- Name: United Kingdom
- Builder: Perry, Wells & Green, Blackwall
- Launched: 23 December 1801
- Captured: 10 November 1809

France
- Acquired: 18 November 1809 by capture
- Captured: 3 December 1810

United Kingdom
- Name: United Kingdom
- Acquired: By capture
- Fate: Wrecked 1815

General characteristics
- Tons burthen: 820, or 88881/94, or 888 or 88881/94, (bm)
- Length: Overall:146 ft 0 in (44.5 m); Keel:118 ft 6 1/2 in (36.1 m)
- Beam: 36 ft 0 1/2 in (11.0 m)
- Depth of hold: 14 ft 9 in (4.5 m)
- Complement: 1803:100; 1804:100; 1804:100; 1807:100
- Armament: 1803:26 × 6&12-pounder guns; 1804:32 × 12-pounder guns; 1804:32 × 12-pounder guns; 1807:32 × 12-pounder guns

United Kingdom was an East Indiaman launched in 1801. She made three voyages to India for the British East India Company (EIC). The French Navy captured her in 1809 during her fourth voyage and the Royal Navy recaptured her in 1810. She became a country ship trading east of the Cape of Good Hope and was wrecked near the Cape in 1815.

== Career ==
=== 1st EIC voyage (1802–1803) ===
Captain Henry Bullock was intended to sail United Kingdom but then Captain George Richardson replaced him and sailed from the Downs on 15 March 1802, bound for Madras and Bengal. United Kingdom reached Madras on 10 July and arrived at Diamond Harbour on 27 July. She left Diamond Harbour on 15 January 1803 and left Saugor on 9 February. She reached Madras on 25 February and left on 9 May. She reached St Helena on 10 August and left on 2 September. She reached Cork on 1 December and arrived back at the Downs on 13 December.

War with France had resumed in March 1803. Captain Richardson received a letter of marque on 20 June.

=== 2nd EIC voyage (1804–1805) ===
Captain John Santer acquired a letter of marque on 25 May 1804, but then Captain John Henry Pelly acquired a letter of marque on 29 June 1804. Pelly sailed from Portsmouth on 10 July, bound for Madras and Bengal. Charlton arrived at Kedgeree on 29 November, but then dropped down to Madras on 12 February 1805. She was at Diamond Harbour on 24 March. Homeward bound, she left Saugor on 28 June, reached St Helena on 22 October, and arrived at the Downs on 22 December.

=== 3rd EIC voyage (1807–1808) ===
Captain William Parker D'Estere acquired a letter of marque on 29 January 1807. He sailed from Portsmouth on 4 March 1807, bound for St Helena and Madras. United Kingdom arrived at St Helena on 13 May St Helena and left on 2 July. She arrived at Madras on 20 September. She left Madras on 22 October, was at the Cape on 30 December, reached St Helena on 25 January 1808, and arrived back at the Downs on 4 April.

=== 4th EIC voyage (1809–capture) ===
Captain D'Estere sailed from Portsmouth 7 July 1809, bound for Madeira, Madras, and Bengal. A French squadron captured her and two other East Indiamen on 18 November at 6°30′N 90°30′E.

French Commodore Jacques Hamelin, raided across the Bay of Bengal in 1809 with his squadron and achieved local superiority, capturing numerous merchant ships and minor warships. On 18 November 1809, three ships of Hamelin's squadron, the frigates Vénus and Manche, and the brig Créole, encountered and captured United Kingdom, Windham, and Charlton. The French officers landed the officers on 7 December at Vizagapatam. (Note: In July 1810 D'Esterre was captain of the newly-built Fairlie on her voyage from Bengal to England.)

The French took their prizes to Mauritius though the Royal Navy recaptured Windham on the way. United Kingdom arrived there on 5 January 1810 and the French put her to use as a prison ship. The EIC stated the value of its cargo on United Kingdom as £2,194.

=== Recapture ===
On 29 November 1810 the British attacked Île de France. Th French surrendered on 3 December.

Lloyd's List published on 15 February 1811 a list of all the vessels captured, military and civilian. Among the prizes was the "East Indiaman United Kingdom (prison ship) of 30 guns and 900 tons".

== Later career and fate ==
The Army took over United Kingdom as a transport. She arrived at Bengal from Île de France on 10 October 1811.

Lloyd's List reported on 4 August 1815 that United Kingdom had foundered off the Cape of Good Hope while sailing from Batavia for London. Captain Laird, the Chief Officer, and twenty-five crew members were saved.
