= Jean Dornal de Guy =

French Naval officer (1771–1855)

Jean Dornal de Guy (Note: The name is sometimes written "Dornaldeguy") (13 October 1771 – 10 May 1855) was a French Navy officer.

== Career ==
In 1803, Commander Dornal de Guy was serving in the flotilla at the Camp de Boulogne. On 7 August, a British brig and a cutter anchored off Boulogne, and the next day, Dornal de Guy received the order from Bruix to attack the ships with five boats. Due to the tides, he could not set sail until 3:00 a.m. the next day. The British put to sail and exchanged gun fire with the boats before retreating.

In 1805, Dornal de Guy captained the frigate Félicité in the Brest squadron. In 1806, he ferried troops, weapons and ammunition from Brest to San Domingo, where he arrived in time to take part in the Battle of San Domingo. Félicité was among the three French ships that survived the battle, and she returned to Lorient on 26 March 1806.

In 1807, Dornal de Guy was appointed captain of the Manche at Cherbourg. Along with the brig Cygne under Menouvrier Defresne, Manche had several encounters with HMS Uranie, under Captain Christopher Laroche. On 20 June, Uranie made a feeble attack on the brig, to which the French hardly reacted. The incident later led to the court-martial and eventual dismissal of Laroche.

Manche captured the 16 gun brig-sloop HMS Seaflower on 27 September 1808 near Bengkulu.

In 1809, Manche was dispatched from Cherbourg to Port-Louis at Ile de France to replace the aging Sémillante, which had been decommissioned and sold to Robert Surcouf. Dornal de Guy arrived on 6 March, and after a one-month leave, Manche undertook her first cruise in the Mozambique Channel. Along with Vénus, she took part in the action of 18 November 1809, capturing three large Indiamen. Dornal de Guy eventually returned to Ile de France after an eight-month patrol, along with Créole and two of the prizes.

After the capture of Jacques Hamelin at the action of 18 September 1810, Dornal de Guy became the senior naval officer of the French forces in the Indian Ocean. In November, seeing that the British forces received sustained reinforcements, he moored his ships (Manche, Astrée, Bellone and Minerve) and disembarked the crews to reinforce the garrison of Port Louis. The Invasion of Île de France occurred in November, and the island surrendered the next month.

== Sources and references ==
=== Bibliography ===
- Roche, Jean-Michel (2005). Dictionnaire des bâtiments de la flotte de guerre française de Colbert à nos jours, 1671 - 1870. Group Retozel-Maury Millau. p. 344. ISBN 978-2-9525917-0-6. OCLC 165892922.
- Fonds Marine. Campagnes (opérations; divisions et stations navales; missions diverses). Inventaire de la sous-série Marine BB4. Tome premier : BB4 1 à 482 (1790-1826)
- Troude, Onésime-Joachim (1867). Batailles navales de la France. Vol. 3. Challamel ainé. pp. 160–162.
- Troude, Onésime-Joachim (1867). Batailles navales de la France. Vol. 4. Challamel ainé. pp. 160–162.
- James, William (2002) [1827]. The Naval History of Great Britain, Volume 1, 1793–1796. London: Conway Maritime Press. ISBN 0-85177-905-0. OCLC 165702223.
