= Mauritius campaign of 1809–1811 =

Military campaign of the Napoleonic Wars

- Part of the Napoleonic Wars
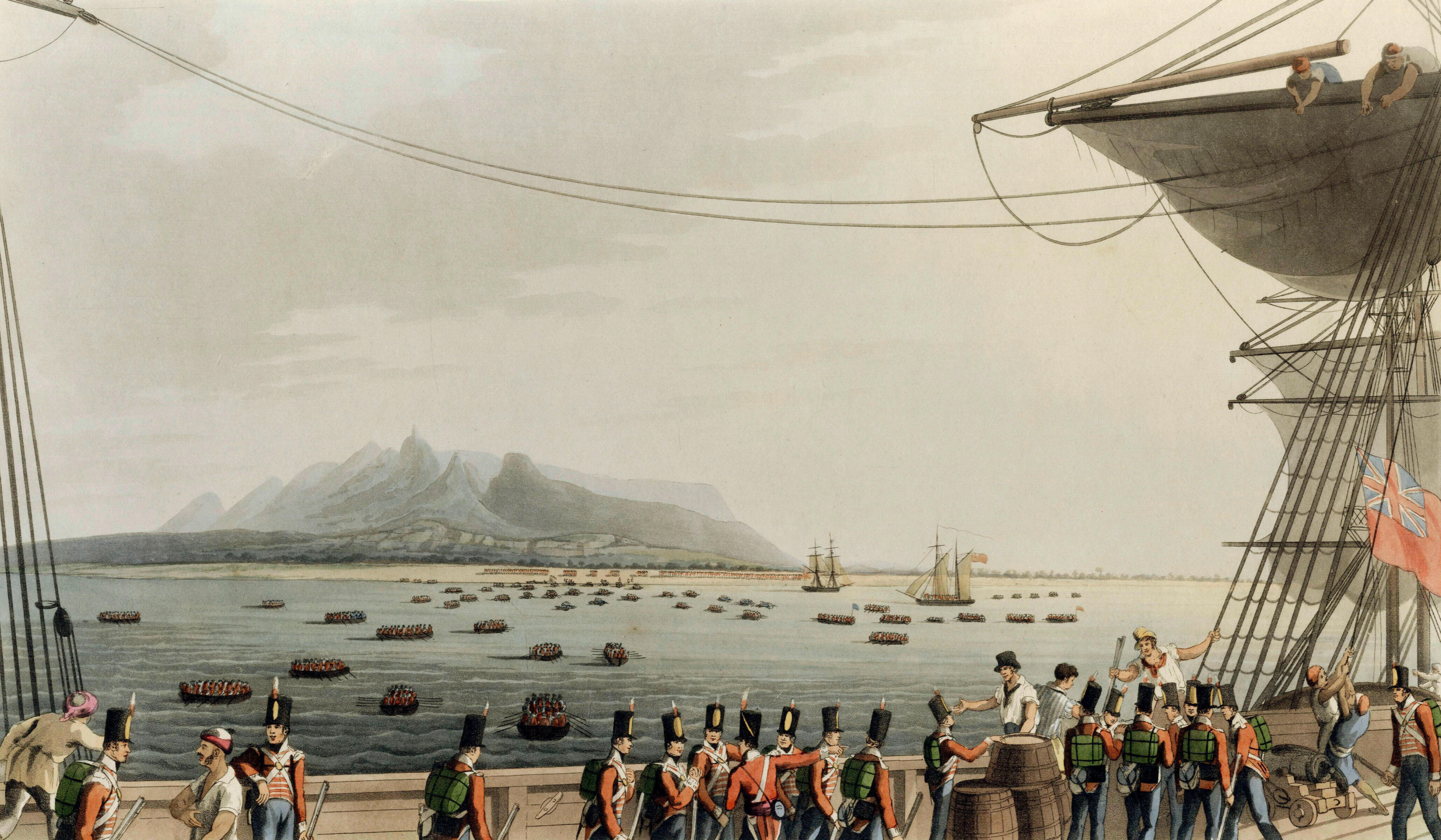
- The British invasion of Isle de France in 1810
Date	1809–1811
Location	Indian Ocean
Result	British victory
Territorial changes	British occupation of Isle de France and Isle Bonaparte

Belligerents
United Kingdom; East India Company	France

Commanders and leaders
Josias Rowley; Henry Keating; Albemarle Bertie	Charles Decaen (surrendered); Jacques Hamelin (surrendered)

The Mauritius campaign of 1809–1811 was a minor military campaign of the Napoleonic Wars fought between British and French forces over France's Indian Ocean colonies of Isle de France and Isle Bonaparte. Lasting from the spring of 1809 to the spring of 1811, the campaign saw the British and French navies deploy substantial frigate squadrons to either protect or disrupt British-flagged shipping in the region. In a war in which the Royal Navy was almost universally dominant at sea, the campaign is especially notable for the local superiority enjoyed by the French Navy in autumn 1810 following their victory at the Battle of Grand Port, the British navy's most significant defeat in the campaign.

British commanders had been planning an operation against Isle de France since occupying the Dutch Cape Colony in 1806 and destroying the Dutch squadron in Java in 1807, but acted earlier than planned following the arrival from France of a powerful frigate squadron under Commodore Jacques Félix Emmanuel Hamelin in late 1808. Hamelin's squadron captured several British East Indiamen and disrupted Britain's trade routes across the Indian Ocean by raiding the convoys in which its merchantmen travelled. Forced to confront this threat, Admiral Albemarle Bertie at the Cape Colony ordered Commodore Josias Rowley to blockade the French colonies and prevent their use use as raiding bases.

For the next two years, the British raided the French colonies' ports and anchorages, while the French continued to target British merchantmen. The British occupied Rodrigues in 1809 and Isle Bonaparte in 1810, but their defeat at Grand Port forced them onto the defensive. Hamelin, unable to secure reinforcements from France, was captured on his flagship Vénus by Rowley in late 1810 shortly before reinforcements under Bertie arrived and occupied Isle de France, renaming it Mauritius. A French squadron which had arrived too late was defeated by the British off Madagascar in May 1811, leaving Britain in complete control of the Indian Ocean. The British kept Mauritius but returned Isle Bonaparte to France in 1814.

== Background ==
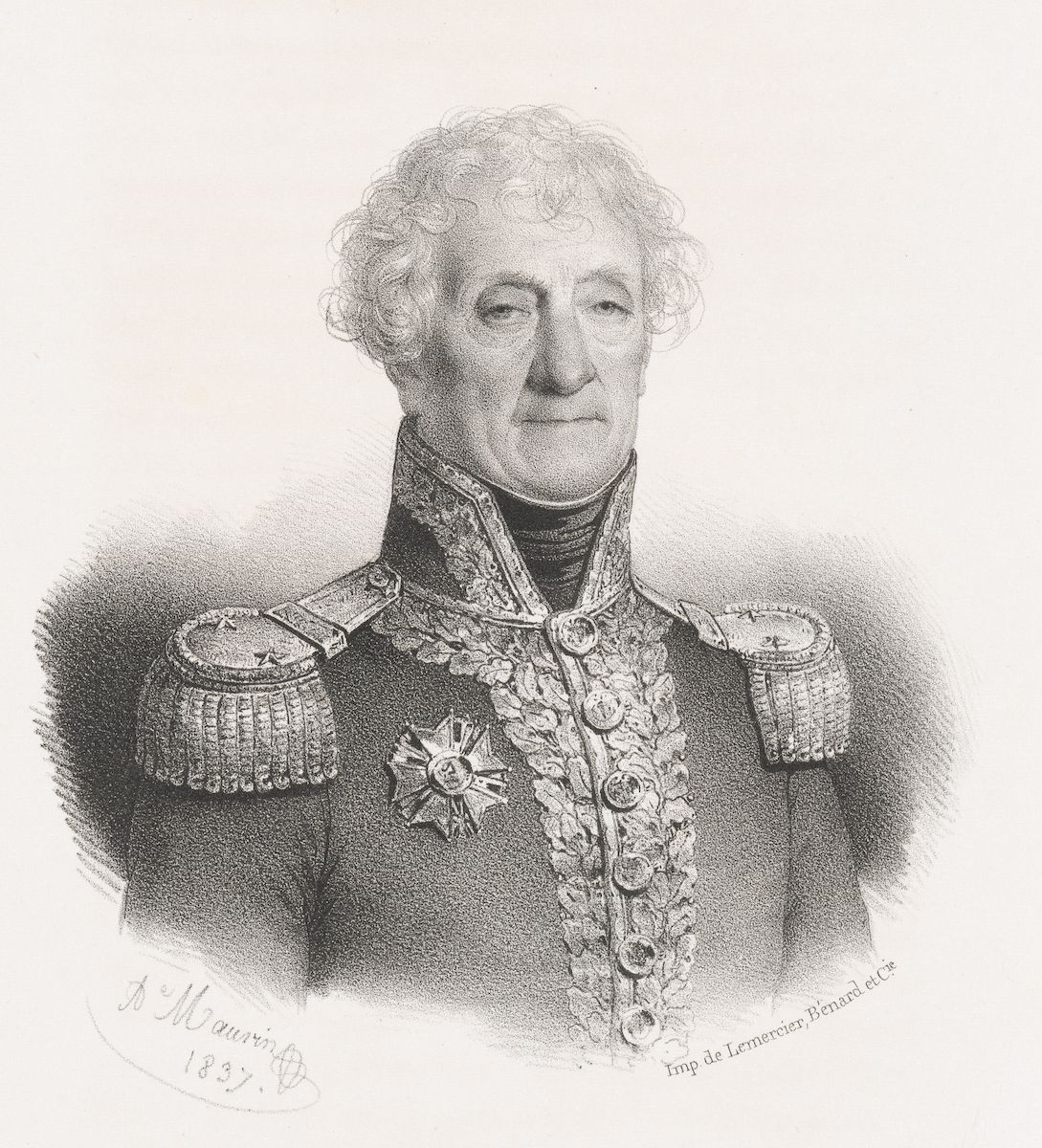
Jacques Hamelin 1837 by Antoine Maurin

The Indian Ocean was a vital part of the chain of trade links that connected the British Empire. Merchant ships from China, Arabia and East Africa crossed it regularly and at its centre was the British-held continent of India, from which heavily laden East Indiamen brought millions of pounds worth of trade goods to Britain every year. Trade with India was vital to the financial security of Britain and consequently the trade routes across the Indian Ocean were a high priority for protection from the Royal Navy and at serious risk from French raiders. The outbreak of the Napoleonic Wars in 1803, following the brief Peace of Amiens that had ended the French Revolutionary Wars, placed the Indian Ocean trade routes under threat from Dutch cruisers operating from Cape Town and the Dutch East Indies and French ships operating from the colonies of Isle de France and Isle Bonaparte. In 1806, British forces occupied the Dutch Cape Colony and by December 1807 had destroyed the Dutch navy's East Indies squadron; these actions led to the elimination of the Dutch as a threat to British overseas interests. However, France's Indian Ocean colonies were far more defensible: heavily fortified, garrisoned by regular French soldiers and several months voyage from the nearest British port, they presented a much greater challenge to the limited British forces available in the region.

At the beginning of the war, as in the preceding conflict, French privateers operated from the islands, including a fleet of small vessels run by Robert Surcouf. Supplementing these ships were vessels of the French Imperial Navy, principally the frigate Piémontaise (captured in March 1808) and the old frigates Sémillante and Canonnière. These ships operated independently of one another and achieved minor successes against smaller British warships and merchant vessels but were not powerful enough to have a serious effect on the Indian Ocean trade routes. In August 1808, Sémillante and Canonnière were downgraded to armed storeships and sent back to France. To replace these ships, four large frigates under Jacques Hamelin were sent to Governor Charles Decaen on Isle de France in the late autumn of 1808. These vessels, Vénus, Manche, Caroline and Bellone were large and powerful ships under orders to operate from Isle de France and Isle Bonaparte against British trade in the Indian Ocean. Based on Isle de France, these frigates had access to large numbers of unemployed sailors and several fortified anchorages from which to launch raids on the British trade routes. A fifth frigate, Niémen, was to have joined the force in the summer of 1809, but was intercepted and captured within hours of leaving France at the action of 6 April 1809.

To counteract the French deployment to the region, a small British force was organised by Vice-Admiral Albemarle Bertie at Cape Town under the command of Commodore Josias Rowley, with orders to blockade Isle de France and Isle Bonaparte and seize or destroy any French ships that operated from the islands. To perform this task, Rowley was given the old ship of the line HMS Raisonnable, the fourth rate HMS Leopard, frigates HMS Nereide, HMS Sirius and HMS Boadicea and a number of smaller ships. Both the British and the French squadrons reached the Indian Ocean in the spring of 1809.

== Campaign ==
=== First exchanges ===
Hamelin's forces were immediately effective: Caroline attacked a westbound convoy of East Indiamen in the action of 31 May 1809 in the Bay of Bengal and captured two, the Streatham and Europe. She seized several other small vessels on the cruise before slipping back to Isle Bonaparte with her prizes in August. Hamelin too cruised in the Bay of Bengal during the summer and autumn, Vénus accompanied by Manche and the corvette Créole. On 26 July, Vénus captured the Honourable East India Company (HEIC) warship Orient off the Nicobar Islands.

Rowley's force had also been active: Nereide under Captain Robert Corbet captured a number of small vessels off Port Napoleon in the late spring, including the brig Aigle, which he sent to the Cape of Good Hope with a prize crew that mutinied, killed their officer and took the ship to Isle Bonaparte. The brig HMS Otter, under Captain Nesbit Willoughby, raided an anchorage at Rivière Noire District on 14 August, capturing a coastal vessel (which he later had to abandon) under heavy fire. Willoughby also recaptured Aigle shortly afterwards. Rowley himself had chased the Bellone in Raisonnable as the French ship emerged from Port Napoleon on 17 August, but had been unable to catch her. Most significant of all was the seizure of the island of Rodrigues by a British Army force from India under Lieutenant Colonel Henry Keating. This small island was close enough to Isle de France to provide an effective base for the British blockade squadron and a staging area for a future invasion of the French islands.

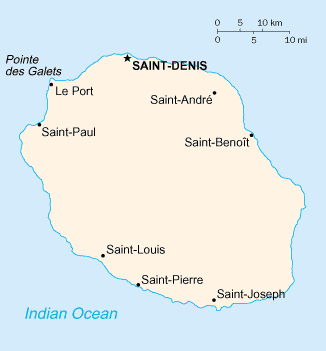
Map of Isle Bonaparte

Rowley's first co-ordinated action was prompted by the return of Caroline with her prizes. Sheltering under the guns of Saint-Paul harbour, Caroline made an inviting target for an expeditionary force from Rodrigues in practice for the anticipated invasion of the whole island. On 21 September, a force of over 600 soldiers, sailors and Royal Marines under Keating and Willoughby landed on Isle Bonaparte and marched around the town's seaward fortifications, storming them from the rear at first light. Capturing each in succession and routing opposition from French militia, the force secured the gun batteries overlooking the port, allowing Rowley to bring his squadron directly into the harbour and bombard the shipping anchored within. The French naval officers, outnumbered and unsupported, drove their ships on shore and abandoned them, allowing the British to seize and carry off Caroline, the two captured East Indiamen and a number of smaller vessels. French attempts to recapture the town were undermined by the failure of the island's commander, General Nicolas Des Bruslys, to engage the British with his main force. Des Bruslys later committed suicide. With the garrison leaderless, a truce was agreed that granted the British five days in control of the town. In this time they were able to remove all government supplies and demolish the town's government buildings. Rowley and his force eventually departed from Saint-Paul on 28 September. As a reward for their services, Willoughby was promoted to command Nereide and Corbet sent back to Britain in Caroline, renamed HMS Bourbonaise.

While Rowley was attacking Saint-Paul, Hamelin and his ships Vénus, Manche, Bellone and Créole were cruising in the Bay of Bengal. On 10 October, Hamelin attacked the Honourable East India Company's base at Tappanooly on Sumatra and burnt it to the ground: the entire population was taken prisoner, although the women were sent to Padang in a small schooner. On 2 November, the British brig HMS Victor was captured by Bellone after a running fight and two weeks later Hamelin intercepted a convoy of three East Indiamen, Windham, Streatham and Charlton, capturing all three in the action of 18 November 1809. On 22 November, Bellone chased, caught and defeated the 52-gun Portuguese frigate Minerva. With their crews now dispersed among their prizes and cyclone season rapidly approaching, Hamelin ordered his squadron back to Isle de France. En route, the convoy was struck by a storm and scattered: Vénus was especially badly damaged and at one point was only saved from sinking by the efforts of the English prisoners aboard. By 31 December, all ships had returned to Isle de France except Windham, which had been recaptured by the recently arrived British frigate HMS Magicienne.

=== Invasion of Isle Bonaparte ===
The French Navy considered 1809 to have been a success; they reinforced Hamelin with one frigate, the only one able to slip through the British blockade of French ports, the Astrée, which arrived early in 1810. Hamelin was quick to act at the end of the cyclone season: Captain Guy-Victor Duperré in Bellone and Captain Pierre Bouvet in the ex-Portuguese Minerva (renamed Minerve) departed Isle de France on 14 March to raid in the Bay of Bengal and subsequently along the South-East coast of Africa. Despite an initial lack of targets, Duperré's cruise was successful: in July he discovered and defeated a convoy of East Indiamen at the action of 3 July 1810, seizing Windham for a second time and Ceylon.

Shortly after Duperré's departure, a British squadron under Captain Henry Lambert consisting of HMS Magicienne, HMS Iphigenia and HMS Leopard arrived off Isle de France to restore the blockade. Rowley subsequently increased Lambert's forces, detaching Willoughby in Nereide with instructions to raid coastal anchorages on the island. On 24 April, Willoughby sighted the recently arrived Astrée, and on 30 April attacked the protected anchorage at Jacolet. His target was a large French merchant ship protected by two batteries and a detachment of regular infantry. Landing at night under heavy fire, Willoughby's men seized one battery, drove off a French attack on their beachhead and captured the second battery despite having to advance across a river, under fire, in broad daylight. On returning to their boats, Willoughby's men were attacked by a second French force which they also routed and drove more than a mile inland. Shortly afterwards however, Willoughby was seriously wounded when a musket he was firing exploded, shattering his jaw. As a result, he was forced to spend several months recovering from his injuries on Rodriguez.

During the late spring, Rowley's force was shorn of Raisonnable and Leopard, sent back to Britain for refit. Although reduced to five frigates and a few smaller vessels, Rowley began preparations for the invasion of Isle Bonaparte by increasing the number of soldiers available on Rodriguez with detachments sent from Madras. Isle Bonaparte was the smaller of the French bases and was more weakly defended, the island's defences damaged in the raid at Saint Paul the previous year. On 24 June, Rowley withdrew Boadicea and Nereide to Rodriguez and collected Keating's force of over 3,000 soldiers. Meeting the rest of his squadron off Isle Bonaparte, Rowley organised two landings on 7 July, either side of the island's capital Saint Denis. Advancing rapidly against weak French defences, the British landing parties forced the island's governor Chrysostôme de Sainte-Suzanne to surrender the following day. It was in the days after this operation that Commander Matthew Flinders, an explorer who had been arrested by Decaen at Port Napoleon eight years earlier and held prisoner despite instructions from Napoleon himself to release him, was freed. Flinders was able to supply Rowley and later Bertie with detailed information about the defences on Isle de France.

=== Battle of Grand Port ===
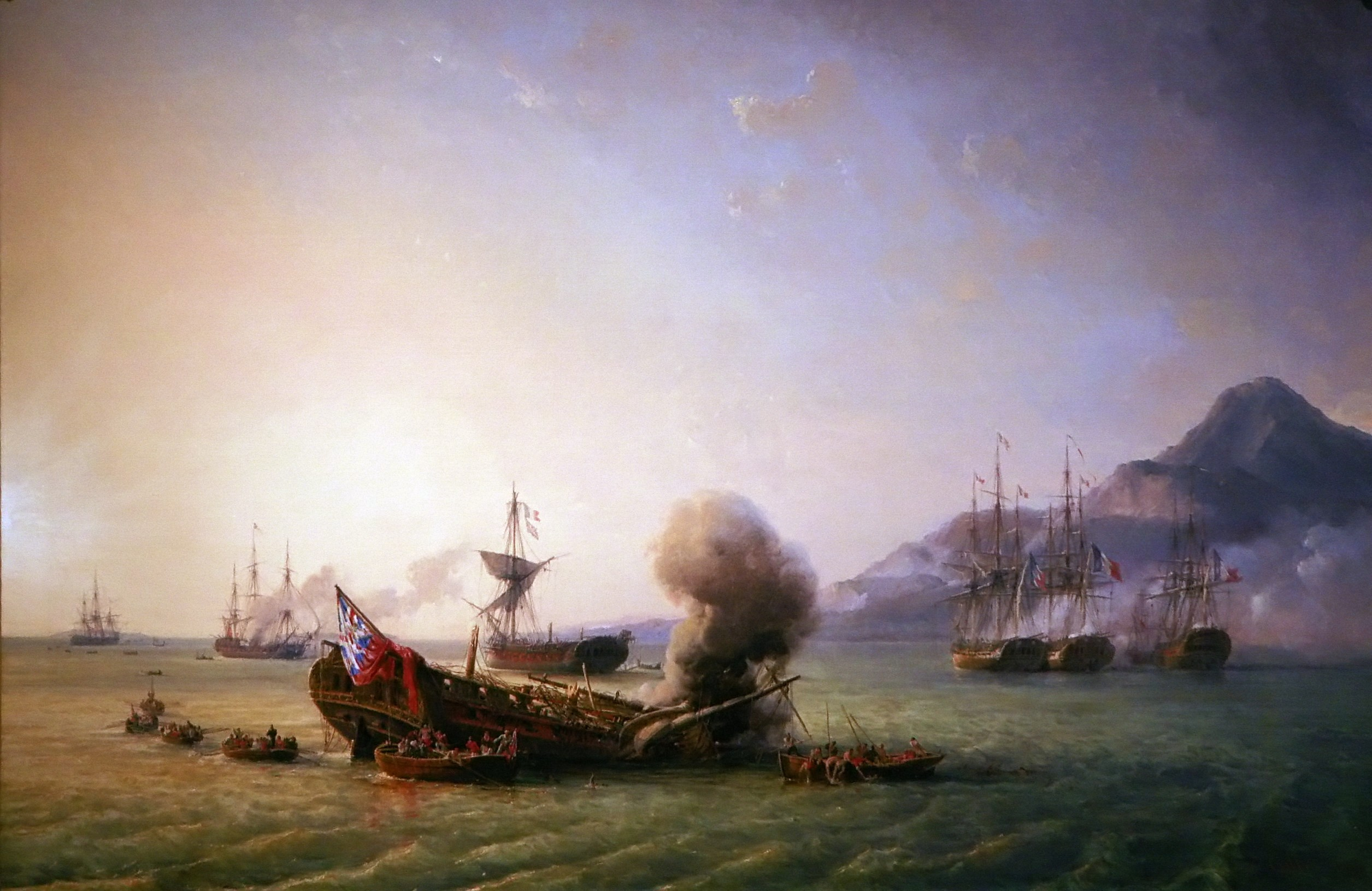
Combat de Grand Port by Pierre Julien Gilbert

Even before the French garrison on Isle Bonaparte had surrendered, Rowley had turned his attention eastwards to Isle de France. The British commander had decided that the best way to eliminate the threat of Hamelin's squadron was to blockade the island's principal ports by seizing the coral islands that marked the entrances to the harbours through the complicated coral reefs that surrounded Isle de France. These islands were fortified, and once in British hands could prevent French ships leaving or entering the harbours, effectively containing Hamelin's ships until Rowley was ready to launch an invasion. Detailed to lead this campaign was Captain Samuel Pym in Sirius and Willoughby in Nereide, with instructions to begin by seizing Île de la Passe at the entrance to the harbour of Grand Port on the south-eastern coast of Isle de France.

Willoughby stormed Île de la Passe on 13 August and captured it, blocking the entrance to Grand Port. With the harbour secure, Willoughby raided along the coastline while Pym, reinforced by Henry Lambert in Iphigenia and Lucius Curtis in Magicienne, blockaded Port Napoleon. On 20 August, sails were spotted approaching Grand Port and Willoughby determined to trick the approaching ships into entering the channel under Île de la Passe, where he could attack and capture them. The squadron was Duperré's squadron returning from the African coast with their prizes and, despite misgivings from Captain Bouvet, Duperré was determined to enter Grand Port and reassured by recognition signals flown by Willoughby, who had captured the French codes on Île de la Passe. As the French passed the fort, Willoughby sprang his trap and opened fire, but a false French tricolour flying from Île de la Passe accidentally ignited as it was lowered. The fire spread to a ready magazine in the fort, which exploded, causing severe damage and casualties. In the confusion all but one of Duperré's ships successfully entered the harbour.

The Battle of Grand Port. French ships are in blue, the British in red.

Willoughby appealed to Pym for assistance and Pym brought Sirius, Iphigenia and Magicienne to support Nereide, launching an assault on Grand Port on 23 August. Pym had failed to properly reconnoitre the channel and Duperré had had the warning buoys removed, so that Pym's squadron was blindly sailing into a complicated system of reefs and channels. Sirius and Magicienne were soon irretrievably grounded while Iphigenia struggled to find a passage and was unable to close with the French squadron. Only Nereide reached Duperré's line and Willoughby's initial attack was so determined that the entire French squadron was rapidly driven ashore, only Bellone remaining in a position to exchange fire with the British frigate. A fortunate shot from Bellone cut Nereide's anchor cable and the British frigate swung around, presenting her stern to the French ships which raked her repeatedly. Willoughby managed to mitigate some of the effects by cutting the other anchor cable, which brought some of his guns within range of the French, but the balance of the battle had shifted. Over the next few hours his frigate was battered from the French ships and from guns ashore until she was a dismasted, battered hulk with over 220 of her crew killed or wounded.

Nereide surrendered on the morning of 24 August and over the next three days Magicienne and Sirius were abandoned and burnt to prevent their seizure by the French. On the morning of 28 August, Iphigenia, laden with survivors from the grounded frigates, was confronted by Hamelin and his main squadron, which had taken seven days to travel from Port Napoleon. Hugely outnumbered, Lambert had no choice but to surrender, ending the worst British naval defeat of the entire war. Rowley arrived in Boadicea on 29 August but was unable to influence the outcome of the battle and was chased back to Saint Denis by Hamelin on Vénus. On the defensive, Rowley sent messages to Rodriguez, Madras and the Cape of Good Hope requesting urgent reinforcements as Bouvet began a blockade of Isle Bourbon in the hope of trapping Boadicea.

On 11 September the frigate HMS Africaine arrived from Rodriguez, commanded by Captain Robert Corbet who had served in the raid on Saint Paul in 1809. Corbet was a deeply unpopular commander and when his frigate was attacked and captured by Bouvet's frigates at the action of 13 September 1810, rumours spread that his death was the result or suicide or even murder, rather than from the battle. Rowley was able to recapture Africaine the following day, but the danger that Hamelin's ships posed to British frigates sailing independently was further emphasised at the action of 18 September 1810, when HMS Ceylon was captured by Hamelin's flagship Vénus. Again, Rowley was able to recapture the British frigate and on this occasion the damage done to Vénus was so severe that she was unable to outrun Boadicea and she too was captured, with Hamelin on board.

=== Capture of Isle de France ===
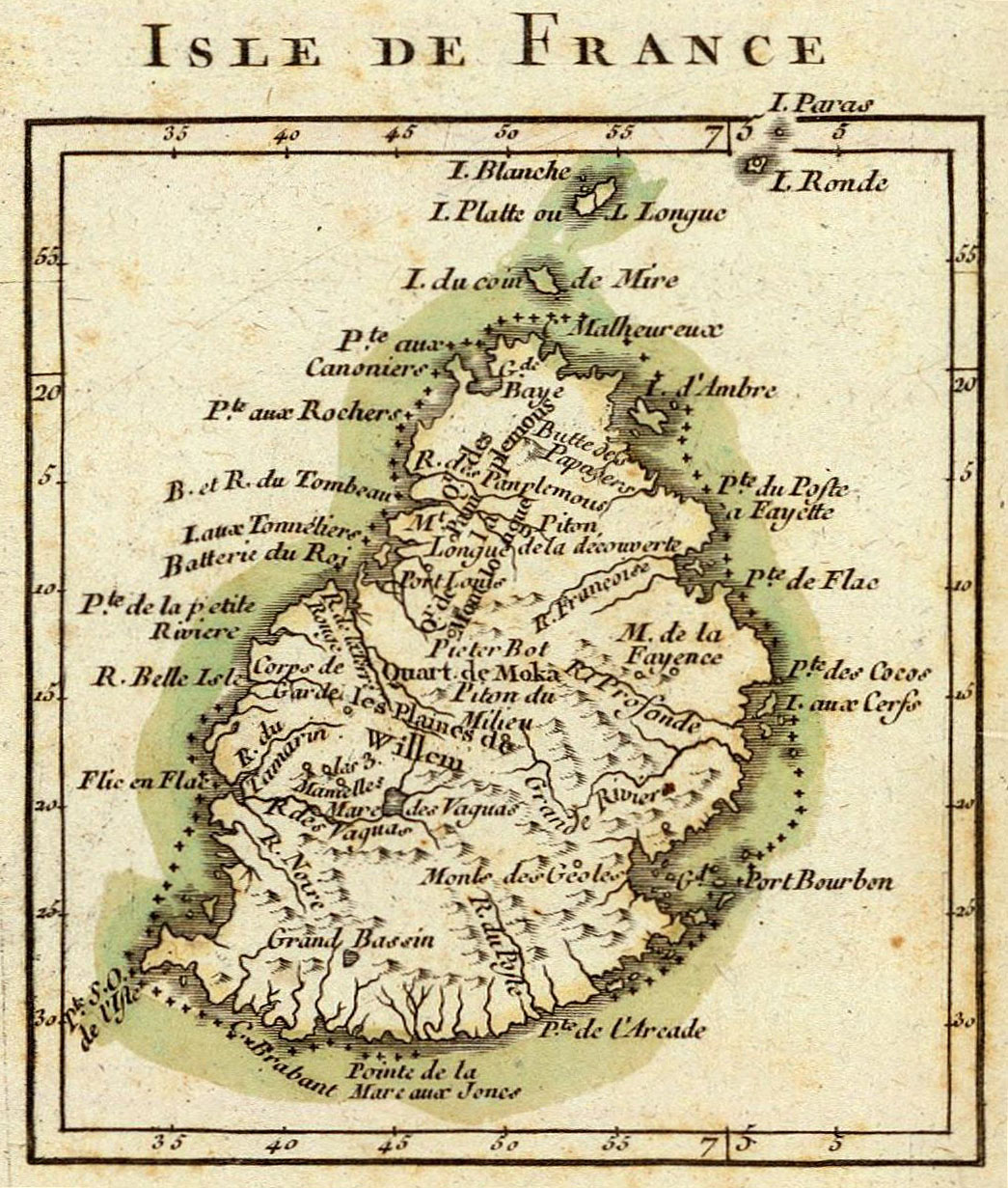
Isle de France, 1791

In September, October and November 1810, British navy and army forces arrived from Madras, Bombay and the Cape of Good Hope, warships joining Rowley's squadron off Isle de France and soldiers gathering at Rodrigues. The buildup of forces was prompted by the defeat at Grand Port combined with the heavy losses of East Indiamen during 1809 and 1810; the British authorities were determined to end the threat posed by the French squadron on Isle de France before the hurricane season made travel in the region too dangerous. In fact, the threat from Isle de France was already substantially reduced: the damage suffered by the French frigates in the engagements at Grand Port and during September could not be repaired with the available naval supplies on Isle de France. In addition, food supplies were running low due to the large number of British prisoners on the island and morale had collapsed in the aftermath of Hamelin's defeat.

By late November 1810, the invasion force was assembled and Vice-Admiral Albemarle Bertie assumed command at Rodrigues. Upon consultation with his commanders, Bertie decided to land at Grand Baie to the north of the island's capital. The landing itself would be commanded by Captain Philip Beaver in HMS Nisus and the first troops ashore would be a specially selected vanguard under Keating and a naval brigade under Captain William Augustus Montagu. These forces would advance on Port Napoleon with subsequent reinforcement by the main force under General John Abercromby over the following days. This force, nearly 7,000 in number, was significantly larger than the reliable troops available to Decaen, which numbered approximately 1,300, and were intended to achieve a quick resolution to the campaign before the hurricane season began in December.

Sailing from Rodrigues on 22 November, the 70 vessels of the invasion fleet reached Grand Baie on 29 November. The French made no attempt to resist the landing either at sea or on land and Keating was able to rapidly advance on the capital, hastily mobilised militia units falling back before the British advance. On 30 November, Keating crossed the Rivière du Tombeau after the militia garrison withdrew and in the evening his forward units were skirmishing with Decaen's garrison of Port Napoleon a few miles from the capital. The following morning, Decaen's field commander, Edmé-Martin Vandermaesen made a stand, forming a line on a rise outside the town that blocked Keating's advance. Engaging the centre, Keating used his superior numbers to outflank and defeat the French garrison and Port Napoleon fell. A ceasefire was agreed on 2 December and the following day Decaen surrendered, although he and his men were repatriated to France with their standards and personal weapons.

== Aftermath ==
The fall of Isle de France marked the end of the active British campaign and saw six frigates and over 200 cannon fall into British hands, in addition to the island itself, which was returned to its original Dutch name of Mauritius, and has been known as such ever since. The island remained under British control until granted independence in 1968. The British forces in the region were scaled back, command passing to Beaver, who sent ships to eliminate French ports on Madagascar and in the Seychelles. Due to the length of time it took for communications to travel between the Indian Ocean and Europe however, the French government were still unaware of the fall of the island in February 1811, when a squadron of reinforcements under François Roquebert, with the supplies needed to repair Hamelin's squadron, was despatched to the Indian Ocean. The squadron arrived on 6 May and was almost brought to battle by a British force off Grand Port, before escaping into the western Indian Ocean. Stopping at Tamatave on Madagascar, the French squadron was caught by a British force under Captain Charles Marsh Schomberg on 20 May and defeated. The Battle of Tamatave was characterised by very light winds, which left the combatants becalmed for much of the day, engaging in periodic fighting as the breeze increased.

Two French frigates were lost at Tamatave, taking the number of frigates lost by the French Navy during the campaign to ten. The defeat marked the end of the campaign and the end of French hopes of seriously disrupting British trade with India: the only remaining safe harbours in the region were a few Dutch colonies on Java, which became the next target of the Royal Navy forces in the region. The Mauritius campaign also had an effect on British post-war strategy in the Indian Ocean, demonstrated by the retention of Mauritius as a colony. Isle Bourbon was returned to France in 1814 after Napoleon's abdication. With strategic bases placed along their trade routes, British convoys were assured a greater degree of safety and the Royal Navy provided with the infrastructure to operate worldwide.

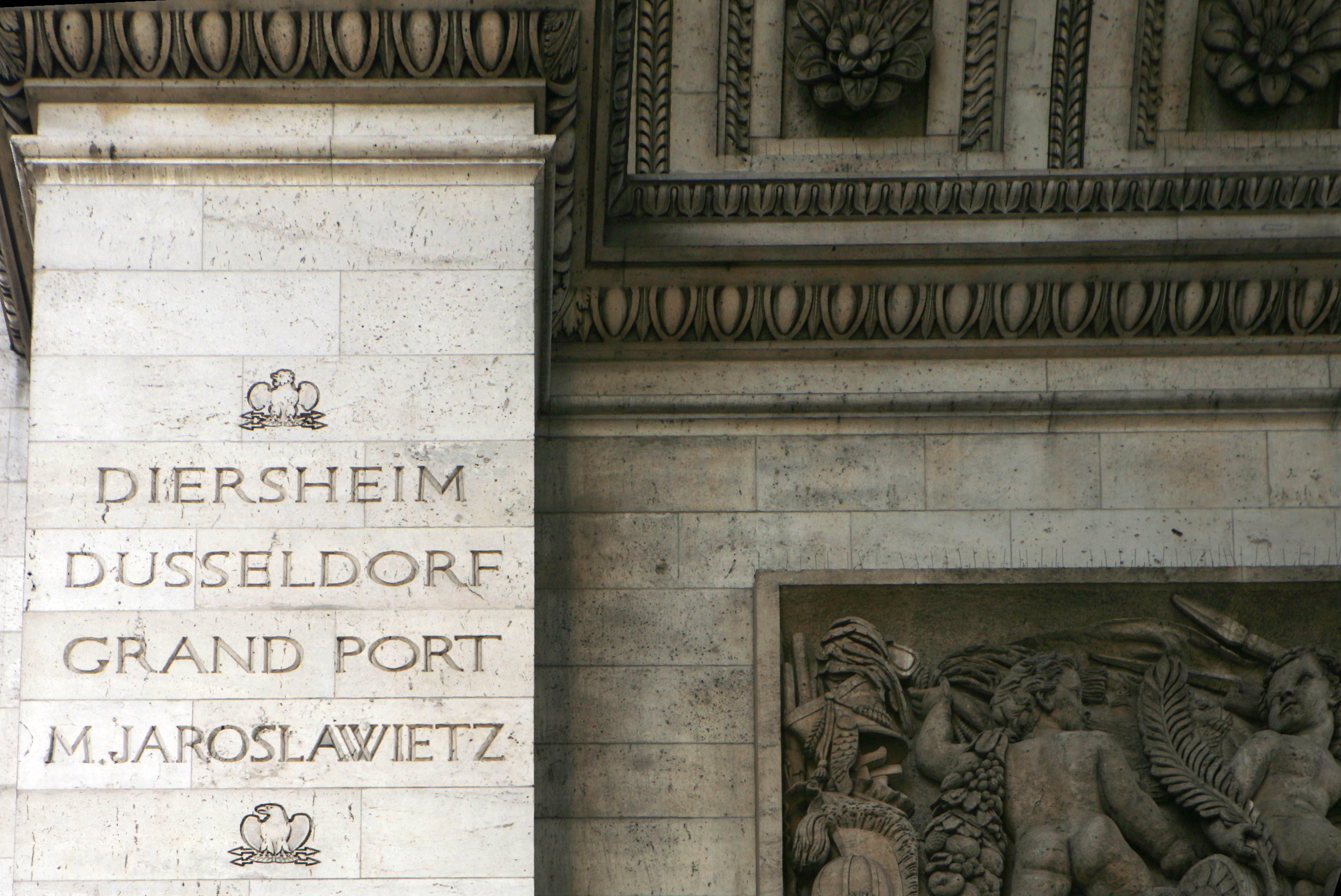
Inscription of the Battle of Grand Port in the Arc de Triomphe.

Isle Bonaparte was known as "Isle Bourbon" until 1789 and Réunion until 1801. British sources never acknowledged either of these changes in name and in 1810 restored the name Isle Bourbon. This was retained by the island's British governors, and from 1814, French governors until the French Revolution of 1848, when the name became Réunion (French: La Réunion) once more. Culturally, the campaign captured the public imagination in Britain and France: the Battle of Grand Port is the only naval battle that appears on the Arc de Triomphe, while in Britain Rowley and Bertie were both made baronets for their services in the Indian Ocean.

== In literature ==
Alexandre Dumas features the campaign from a French perspective in his 1843 novel Georges. The 1977 novel The Mauritius Command by Patrick O'Brian, part of the Aubrey–Maturin series, closely follows the British campaign, with Rowley replaced by the fictional Jack Aubrey.

== Bibliography ==
- Brenton, Edward Pelham (1825). The Naval History of Great Britain, Vol. IV. C. Rice.
- Clowes, William Laird (1997) [1900]. The Royal Navy, A History from the Earliest Times to 1900, Volume V. Chatham Publishing. ISBN 1-86176-014-0.
- Gardiner, Robert, ed. (2001) [1998]. The Victory of Seapower. Caxton Editions. ISBN 1-84067-359-1.
- James, William (2002a) [1827]. The Naval History of Great Britain, Volume 5, 1808–1811. Conway Maritime Press. ISBN 0-85177-909-3.
- James, William (2002b) [1827]. The Naval History of Great Britain, Volume 6, 1811–1827. Conway Maritime Press. ISBN 0-85177-910-7.
- Macmillan, Allister (1914). Mauritius Illustrated. W.H.& L. Collingridge. ISBN 9788120615083.
- Mostert, Noel (2007). The Line upon a Wind: The Greatest War Fought at Sea Under Sail 1793 – 1815. Vintage Books. ISBN 978-0-7126-0927-2.
- Taylor, Stephen (2008). Storm & Conquest: The Battle for the Indian Ocean, 1809. Faber & Faber. ISBN 978-0-571-22467-8.
- Winfield, Rif (2008). British Warships in the Age of Sail 1793–1817: Design, Construction, Careers and Fates. Seaforth Publishing. ISBN 978-1-86176-246-7.
- Woodman, Richard (2001). The Sea Warriors. Constable Publishers. ISBN 1-84119-183-3.
