= François-Désiré Breton =

François Désiré Breton (1 May 1781, Sainte-Rose, Guadeloupe - 15 April 1820, Les Cayes, Haiti) was a French naval officer.

== Career ==
In 1800, aged 19, Breton departed Le Havre on Géographe as an ensign First Class to take part in Baudin expedition of 1800 to 1802. On 29 October 1801, at Timor, he transferred to Naturaliste. Aboard, he was appreciated by ensign Henri de Freycinet, though Baudin himself labeled him "the most useless of all aboard, and that is saying something".

In 1803, Breton served in the Indian Ocean, captaining the frigate Manche.

== Notes and references ==
=== Bibliography ===
- Breton, François Désiré. Journal de François-Désiré Breton (PDF). Archives nationales de France, série Marine, 5JJ57. Archived from the original (PDF) on 2016-03-04.
- Baudin, Nicolas (2000). Mon voyage aux Terres australes, journal personnel du commandant Baudin. Actes Sud. ISBN 978-2743303846.
- Péron, François (1824). Voyage de découvertes aux terres australes. A. Bertrand. ISBN 978-2743303846.
