= Hartog Plate =

Inscribed plate commemorating Dirk Hartog's 1616 landing in Western Australia

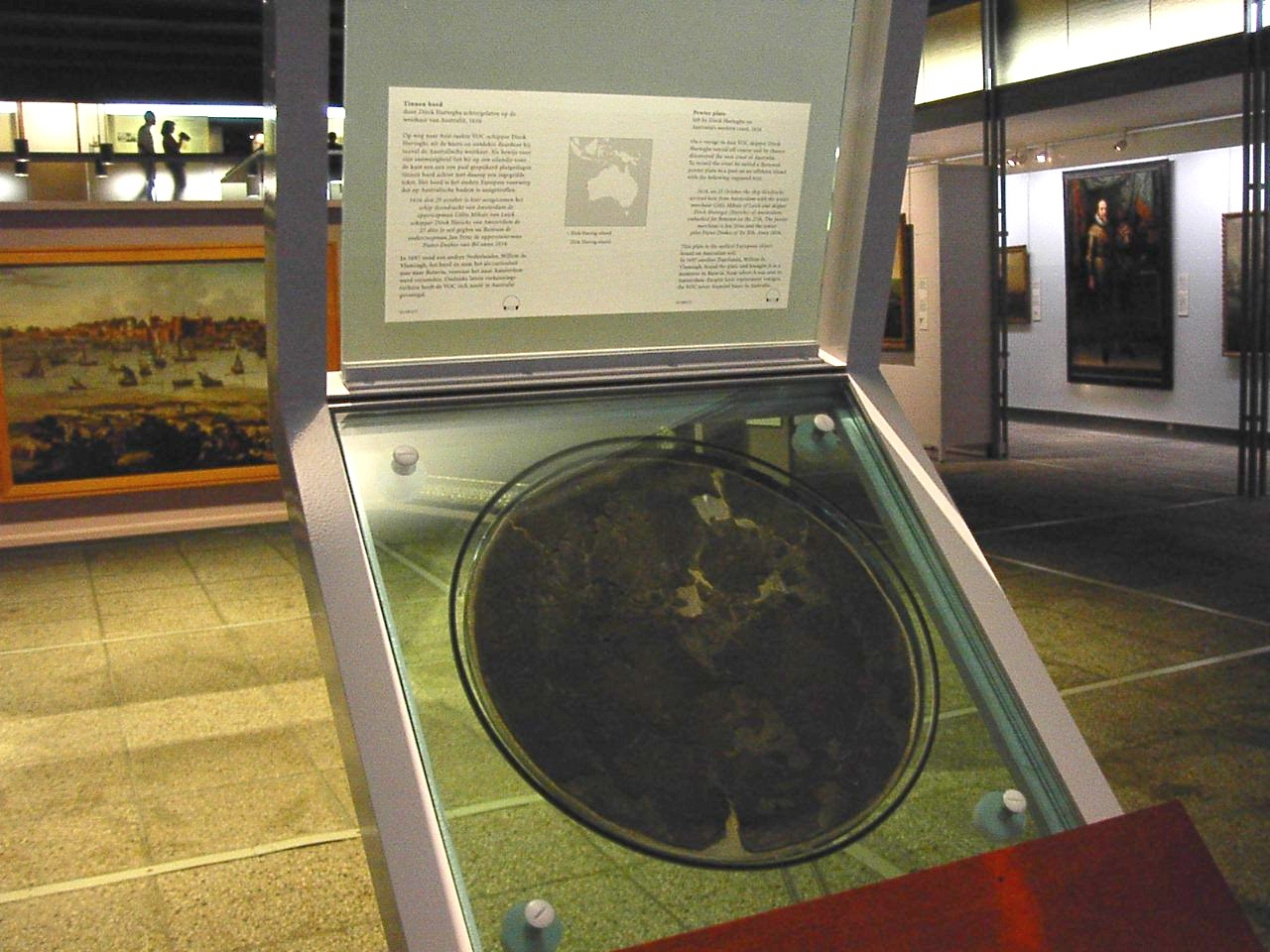
Original of Dirk Hartog's plate in the Rijksmuseum, Amsterdam

Hartog Plate or Dirk Hartog's Plate is either of two pewter plates, although primarily the first, which were left on Dirk Hartog Island on the western coast of Australia before European settlement there. The first plate, left in 1616 by Dutch explorer Dirk Hartog, is the oldest-known artefact of European exploration in Australia still in existence. A replacement, which includes the text of the original and some new text, was left in 1697; the original dish was returned to the Netherlands, where it is now on display in the Rijksmuseum. Further additions at the site, in 1801 and 1818, led to the location being named Cape Inscription.

== Dirk Hartog, 1616 ==
Dirk Hartog was the first confirmed European to see Western Australia, reaching it in his ship the Eendracht. On 25 October 1616, he landed at Cape Inscription on the very northernmost tip of Dirk Hartog Island, in Shark Bay. Before departing, Hartog left behind a pewter dinner plate, nailed to a post and placed upright in a fissure on the cliff top.

The plate bears the inscription:

1616, DEN 25 OCTOBER IS HIER AENGECOMEN HET SCHIP D EENDRACHT
VAN AMSTERDAM, DEN OPPERKOPMAN GILLIS MIBAIS VAN LVICK SCHIPPER DIRCK HATICHS VAN AMSTERDAM
DE 27 DITO TE SEIL GEGHM (sic) NA BANTAM DEN
ONDERCOOPMAN JAN STINS OPPERSTVIERMAN PIETER DOEKES VAN BIL Ao 1616.

Translated into English:

1616, on the 25th October, arrived here the ship Eendracht of
Amsterdam; the upper merchant, Gilles Mibais of Liège; Captain Dirk
Hartog of Amsterdam; the 27th ditto set sail for Bantam; undermerchant
Jan Stein, upper steersman, Pieter Doekes from Bil, A[nn]o 1616.

== Willem de Vlamingh, 1697 ==
Map of Shark Bay area showing Dirk Hartog Island and Cape Inscription

Eighty-one years later, in 1697, the Dutch sea captain Willem de Vlamingh also reached the island and discovered Hartog's pewter dish with the post almost rotted away. He removed it and replaced it with another plate which was attached to a new post. The new post was made of a cypress pine trunk taken from Rottnest Island. The original dish was returned to the Netherlands, where it is still kept in the Rijksmuseum Amsterdam. De Vlamingh's replacement dish contains all of the text of Hartog's original plate as well as listing the senior crew of his own voyage. It concludes with:

1697. Den 4den Februaij is hier aengecomen het schip de GEELVINK voor
Amsterdam, den Comander ent schipper, Willem de Vlamingh van Vlielandt,
Adsistent Joannes van Bremen, van Coppenhagen; Opperstvierman Michil Bloem vant
Sticgt, van Bremen De Hoecker de NYPTANGH, schipper Gerrit Colaart van
Amsterdam; Adsistent Theodorus Heirmans van dito Opperstierman Gerrit
Gerritsen van Bremen, 't Galjoot t' WESELTJE, Gezaghebber Cornelis de
Vlamingh van Vlielandt; Stvierman Coert Gerritsen van Bremen, en van hier
gezeilt met onse vlot den voorts net Zvydtland verder te ondersoecken en
gedestineert voor Batavia.

Translated into English:

On the 4th of February, 1697, arrived here the ship
GEELVINCK, of Amsterdam; Commandant Wilhelm de Vlamingh, of Vlielandt;
assistant, Jan van Bremen, of Copenhagen; first pilot, Michiel Bloem van
Estight, of Bremen. The hooker, the NYPTANGH, Captain Gerrit Collaert, of
Amsterdam, Assistant Theodorus Heermans, of the same place; first pilot,
Gerrit Gerritz, of Bremen; then the galliot WESELTJE, Commander Cornelis
de Vlaming, of Vlielandt; Pilot Coert Gerritz, from Bremen. Sailed from
here with our fleet on the 12th, to explore the South Land, and
afterwards bound for Batavia.

== Emmanuel Hamelin, 1801 ==
In 1801, the French captain of the Naturaliste, Jacques Félix Emmanuel Hamelin, second-in-command of an expedition led by Nicolas Baudin in the Geographe entered Shark Bay and sent a party ashore. The party found Vlamingh's plate, even though it was half buried in the sand, as the post had rotted away with the ravages of the weather. When they took the plate to the ship, Hamelin ordered it to be returned, believing its removal would be tantamount to sacrilege. He also had a plate, or similar, of his own prepared and inscribed with details of his voyage (dating to 16 July 1801) and he had both erected at the Vlamingh site, even adding a small Dutch flag to the plaque. It was then named Cape Inscription.

== Louis de Freycinet, 1818 ==
In 1818, in the Uranie, French explorer Louis de Freycinet, who had been an officer in Hamelin's 1801 crew, sent a boat ashore to recover Vlamingh's plate and substituted a lead plate, which has never been found. His wife Rose de Freycinet, who was on board, having stowed away with her husband's assistance, recorded the event in what was in effect a diary of her circumnavigation. After the Uranie was wrecked in the Falkland Islands, the plate and other materials from the voyage were later transferred to another ship and taken to France, where the plate was presented to the Académie Française in Paris.

After being lost for more than a century, the Vlamingh plate was rediscovered in 1940 on the bottom shelf of a small room, mixed up with old copper engraving plates, the discovery was announced in December of 1944. In recognition of Australian losses in the defence of France during the two world wars, the plate was eventually returned to Australia in 1947 and is currently housed in the Western Australian Maritime Museum in Fremantle, Western Australia.

== Cape Inscription Lighthouse plaques ==
Marking the location in 1938, the Commonwealth government commemorated Dirk Hartog's landing with a brass plaque.

Just short of 60 years later, on 12 February 1997, the then-premier of Western Australia Richard Court unveiled a bronze plaque to mark the tricentennial of Vlamingh's visit.

The lighthouse and plaques are located at 25°28′55″S 112°58′19″E.

== See also ==
- History of Western Australia
