= French frigate Vénus (1806) =

Junon-class frigate of the French Navy

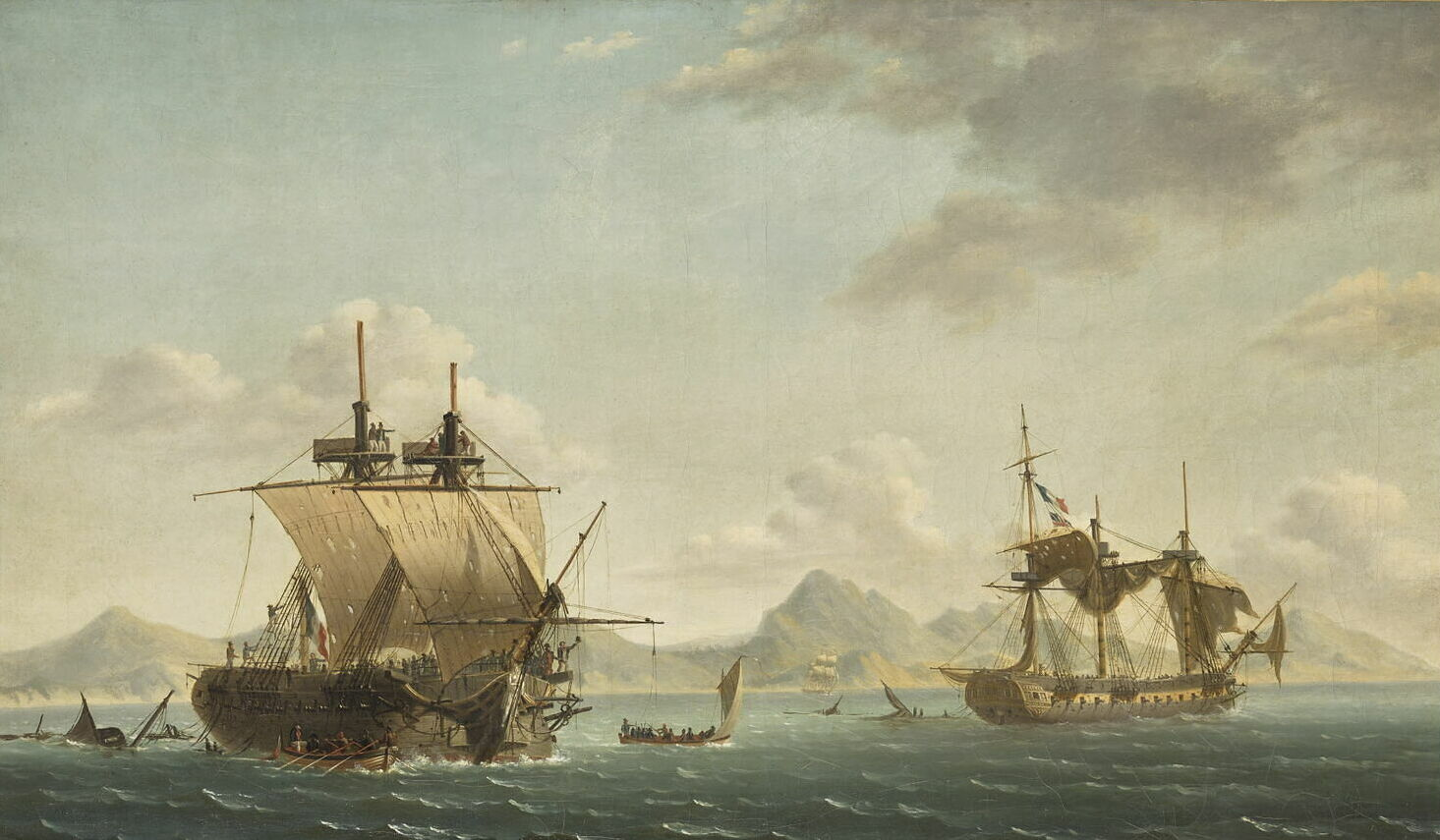
- Vénus (left) at the action of 18 September 1810

History

France
- Name: Vénus
- Namesake: Venus
- Ordered: 26 March 1805
- Builder: Le Havre
- Laid down: April 1805
- Launched: 5 July 1806
- In service: August 1808
- Captured: 18 September 1810

United Kingdom
- Name: Nereide
- Fate: Broken up in 1816

General characteristics
Type	Frigate
Tons burthen	1148 bm
Length	46 metres (151 ft)
Beam	12 metres (39 ft)
Draught	7 metres (23 ft)
Complement	330 men
Armament	40 guns: Battery: 28 × 18-pounder long guns; Quarterdeck and forecastle: 12 × 8-pounder long guns
Armour	Timber

Vénus was a 40-gun Junon-class frigate of the French Imperial Navy. She was captured in 1810 by the Royal Navy, and taken into British service as HMS Nereide. She was broken up in 1816.

== French service ==
On 10 November 1808, she departed Cherbourg, bound for Île de France, where she served as Rear-Adm Hamelin's flagship, leading a squadron also comprising the frigate Manche and the sloop Créole.

On the 29 and 30 December 1808, she captured and destroyed the East Indiamen Hiran and Albion. On 4 November 1809, she captured the East Indiaman Lady Bentick and the American merchantman Samson.

She was central in the action of 18 November 1809, where the squadron captured three armed East Indiamen, including Windham.

From 20 to 26 August 1810, Vénus took a minor part in the Battle of Grand Port.

On 17–18 September 1810, along with the privateer corvette Victor, Vénus captured the 40-gun HMS Ceylon, losing her fore-mast and her topgallant masts in the process. The next day, a British squadron composed of HMS Boadicea, HMS Otter and the brig HMS Staunch captured Vénus and recaptured Ceylon. Victor managed to escape.

== British service ==
Vénus was brought into British service as HMS Nereide, in honour of the defence of HMS Nereide at Grand Port. She subsequently took part in the blockade and surrender of Île de France.

== Fate ==
She was broken up in 1816.
