= French frigate Manche =

19th-century Hortense-class frigate of the French Navy

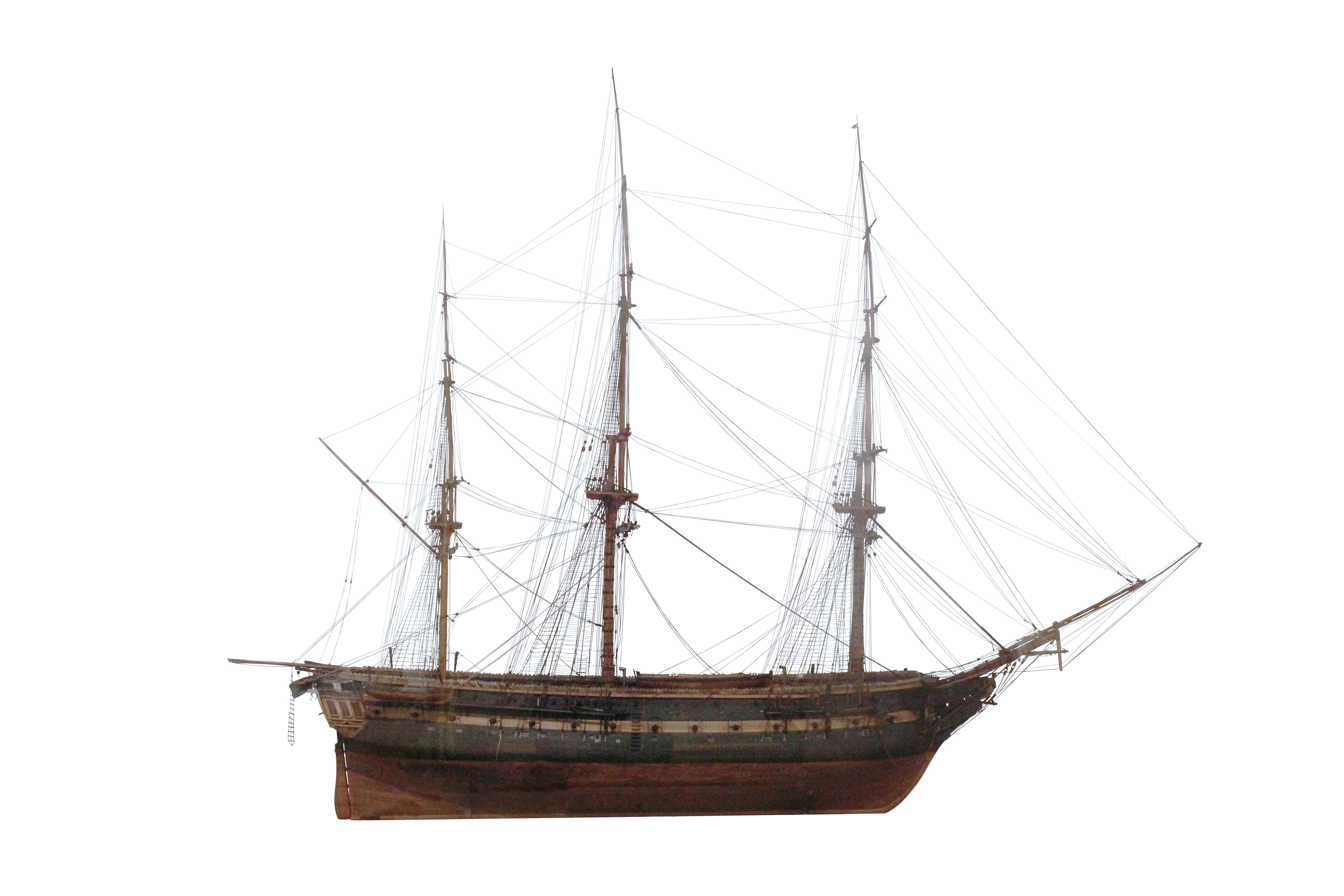
- Hortense, sister-ship of Manche

History

France
- Name: Manche
- Namesake: English Channel
- Ordered: 6 October 1803 and 30 January 1806
- Builder: Cherbourg Dockyard (Constructeur: Jacques Bonard)
- Laid down: May 1804
- Launched: 5 April 1806
- Fate: Broken up

General characteristics
- Class & type: Hortense-class frigate
- Displacement: 1390 tons (French)
- Length: 48.75 m (159.9 ft)
- Beam: 12.2 m (40 ft)
- Draught: 5.9 m (19 ft)
- Propulsion: Sails
- Sail plan: Ship
- Armament: UD:28 × 18-pounder long guns; Spardeck: 12 × 8-pounder long guns

Manche was a 40-gun Hortense-class frigate of the French Navy, originally named Département de la Manche, but the name was immediately shortened to Manche around the time of her launch in April 1806.

She took part in operations in the Mauritius campaign of 1809–1811 under Captain François-Désiré Breton.

== Action during Mauritius campaign of 1809-1811 ==
Under Captain Jean Dornal de Guy, Manche captured the 16-gun gun brig HMS Seaflower, Lieutenant William Fitzwilliam Owen commanding, on 28 September 1808 near Bengkulu.

On 26 April 1809, Manche departed Port-Napoléon in a squadron under Captain Hamelin, along with Créole and Vénus. The squadron managed to re-take Foulpointe in Madagascar, captured three prizes at the action of 18 November 1809, and raided the British settlement at Tarapouly, in Sumatra.

In 1810, she took part in the Battle of Grand Port, contributing to the capture of HMS Iphigenia and the fort held by the British on Île de France.

== Fate ==
Manche was captured by British forces during the invasion of Île de France in 1810. She was broken up as she was unfit for service in the Royal Navy.
