= French Imperial Navy =

- Marine Impériale
- Ensign of the French Imperial Navy
- Active: 1804–1814; 1815
- Country: First French Empire
- Type: Navy
- Headquarters: Hôtel de la Marine, Paris
- Engagements: Napoleonic Wars

Commanders
- Supreme commander: Napoleon
- Notable commanders: See list: César-Joseph Bourayne; Julien Cosmao; Denis Decrès; Guy-Victor Duperré; Honoré Joseph Antoine Ganteaume; Jacques Félix Emmanuel Hamelin; Louis-Jean-Nicolas Lejoille; Charles-Alexandre Léon Durand Linois; Jean Jacques Étienne Lucas; Pierre François Étienne Bouvet de Maisonneuve; Pierre Martin; François Étienne de Rosily-Mesros; Édouard Thomas Burgues de Missiessy; Albin Roussin; Pierre César Charles de Sercey; Robert Surcouf; Laurent Jean François Truguet; Pierre-Charles Villeneuve; Jean-Baptiste Philibert Willaumez

The French Imperial Navy (French: Marine Impériale) was the navy of the First French Empire which existed between 1804 and 1815. It was formed in May 1804 from the navy of the French First Republic, and spent its existence fighting against the Royal Navy in concert with allied navies as part of the Napoleonic Wars. Napoleon intended for the Imperial Navy to play a major role in his planned invasion of the United Kingdom, though this proved infeasible after the British navy dealt a crushing defeat to a Franco-Spanish fleet at Trafalgar.

Realising that the French navy was too weak to directly confront its British counterpart, Napoleon instead embarked on an extensive naval expansion programme to create a fleet in being that would force the Royal Navy to continually to guard against it. This was intended to work in concert with his Continental System, which cut off Britain's trade with Europe, along with Napoleon's directives that small French squadrons slip past Royal Navy blockades and attack British merchant shipping and colonies around the globe.

Despite Napoleon's attempt to revive the French navy, it remained unable to challenge the Royal Navy for control of the sea and continued to suffer defeats. In April 1814 Napoleon abdicated from the throne and the Imperial Navy was transformed into the French Royal Navy; several French warships were ceded to the Sixth Coalition as war reparations. The French navy briefly became the Imperial Navy again when Napoleon again seized control during the Hundred Days, but saw little action before being transformed again in July 1815.

== History ==
=== Fleet of the Restoration ===
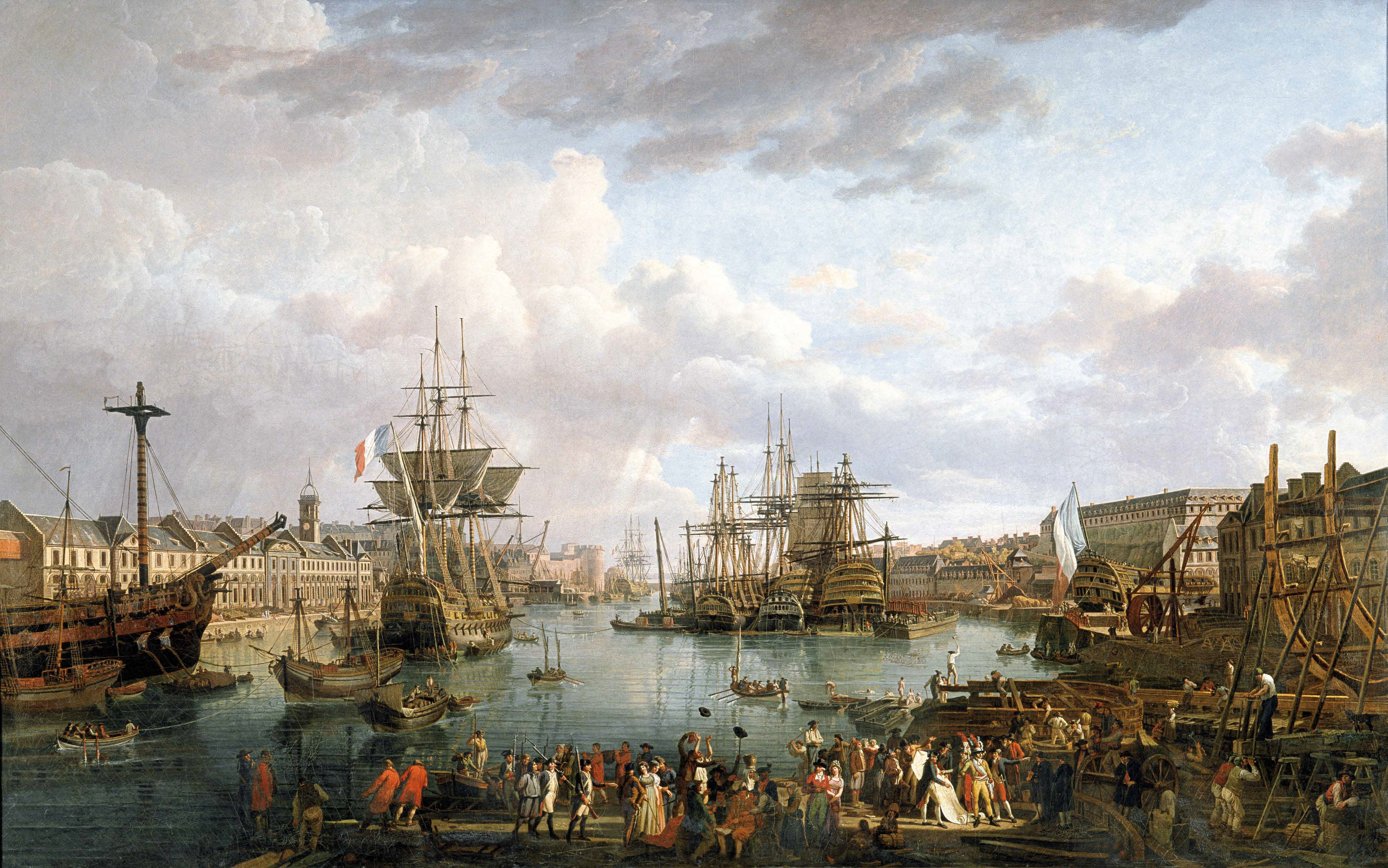
View of the Port of Brest by Jean-François Hue, 1794

In 1789, the French Navy was the second strongest navy in the world (only second to the British Royal Navy). The navy had been rebuilt since the disasters of the Seven Years' War. During the American War of Independence, (Anglo-French War (1778–1783)), the French managed a few successes against the Royal Navy which could at best contain this new, rejuvenated, navy. French naval officers had become more talented and one, Admiral Pierre André, Comte de Suffren, proved to be a brilliant opponent in the Indian Ocean (Second Anglo-Mysore War). Following the Treaty of Paris in 1783, the French continued to make improvements to the navy that had brought them revenge for the defeats of the Seven Years' War. The standard French ships of the line were of 74 guns (Third-rate designation) and were of excellent design. Some reforms were made in 1782, which organised the French Navy in the most sweeping fashion since the days of Louis XIV. The whole navy was divided into nine fleets (or squadrons) with many measures made for greater efficiency.

The way the French fleet was officered and manned was somewhat different to that of the Royal Navy. In the 1780s the officer corps was filled almost exclusively by the sons of noble families. Indeed, to become a Student of the Navy (Elève de la Marine) (the equivalent of a Midshipman in the Royal Navy), the young aspiring officer had to apply with a certified copy of his family genealogy to ensure that he had the required amount of 'blue blood'. This system, which ensured officer positions for the nobility, nevertheless produced good officers since they were highly trained. Its evil lay in the unfairness to qualified men condemned to the lower deck or the merchant marine because they were not of noble blood. Because of this lacking hope, bitterness increased dramatically both in the army and the navy.

In 1789 the French navy had three main military seaports: Brest and Rochefort on the Atlantic, and Toulon on the Mediterranean. These ports were the headquarters for senior commanders, and the bases for most Marine units. They had large shipyards for the construction and refitting of warships, as well as related industries, and were the homes of thousands of ouvriers, the shipyard workers. There was a powerful corps of administrative and technical officers such as commissars, shipbuilding engineers, and so on. There were the officers of the pen (officiers de plume) as opposed to the officers of the sword (officiers d'épée), the sea-faring naval officers who had little regard and much disdain for the "paper pushers". There were smaller bases in France, such as Lorient and Cherbourg, and also in the colonies, such as Fort Saint Louis in Martinique and Port Louis in Île-de-France, which were humbler versions of the three great ports, all with the same military and administrative structure.

=== Napoleon's reforms ===
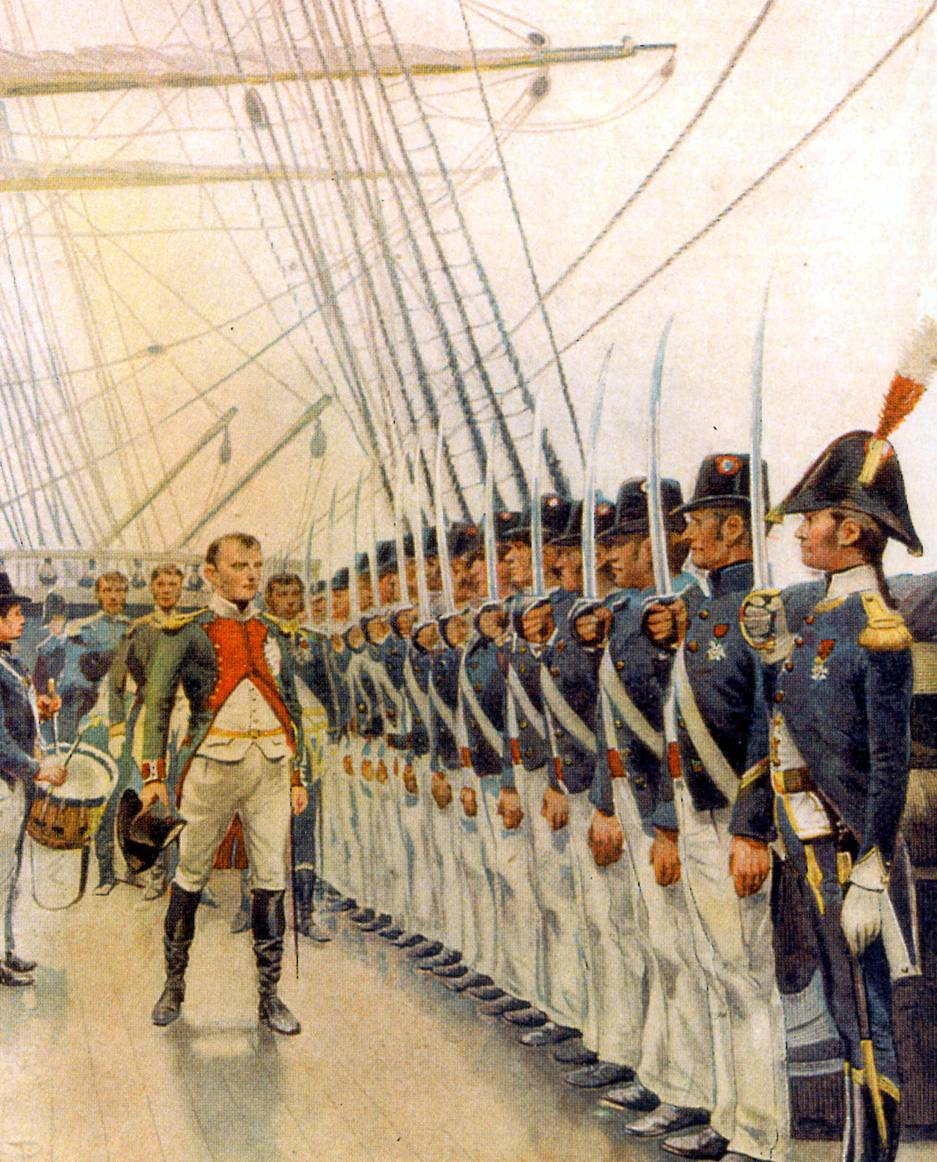
1850 illustration of Napoleon inspecting the Imperial Navy's Cherbourg squadron in May 1811

Napoleon has often been considered to misunderstand the navy. Being an artillery officer, he was given to precise calculations and never quite accepted that the wind was more important to ships than his orders. His impatience at his fleet at Boulogne is famous. Much less known but just as important were his naïve pragmatic measures toward the fleet taken during 1800–1801. In a general reform, a mass of individuals notable for their 'crass ignorance' were kicked out of the navy and the ranks opened to anyone with decent qualifications, including former naval officers who had served under the ancien régime, as well as educated and talented young men. To improve discipline, the old pre-1789 general regulations were brought back into force and new ones drafted, bringing back order and submission to central authority. The concept of having, besides the larger warships, armed small craft in 'flotillas' also evolved at this time and resisted two attempts by the British Channel Fleet under Vice-admiral Horatio Nelson to destroy it in August 1801.

Vice-admiral Denis Decrès, an able administrator but unfortunately more of a courtier than a naval strategist, was made Minister of the Marine in 1801, a portfolio he held until the final exile of the Emperor in 1815 (see below). Great efforts and vast sums of money were allotted to the navy by the First Consul. The navy had 83 ships of the line in 1792, but only 46 ten years later, while the numbers of frigates had gone from 74 to 37. To build new ships large military seaports and shipyards were set up at Cherbourg and Antwerp – the latter especially worried British Prime Minister William Pitt, who felt it was a 'pistol aimed at the head of England'. For the first time in over a decade the navy emerged from chaos, thanks to Napoleon's measures.

However, a good navy takes many years to build, not only ships, but an ample reserve of skilled officers and sailors. At first, Napoleon wrongly presumed that uniting the fleets of Spain and Holland to that of France would automatically produce a great fleet – like gathering the contingents for the Grande Armée. Skilled manpower was always a problem for the fleet, which Napoleon tackled with increasingly military measures. A first experiment had been the formation of the Légion Nautique during the French campaign in Egypt and Syria. Following the defeat of the French fleet at Abukir, nearly 2,500 sailors and Marine artillerymen were stranded in Alexandria and used to form the new legion during October and November 1798. Issued with arms and uniforms, the new legion had eight companies of fusiliers, one of grenadiers, and sections of artillery and pioneers. General Bonaparte noted that the sailors could be trained and led quite efficiently in a militarised organisation. He did not forget this. The Légion Nautique was repatriated to France at British expense in September 1801, but disbanded after returning. Many of the veterans of this legion would later serve in the famed Sailors of the Imperial Guard. Napoleon's reforms also included an administrative restructuring, as on April 1800 he ordered the creation of six maritime districts, each headed by maritime prefect who combined civil and military authorities in his duties.

=== Trafalgar Campaign ===
==== Initial Plans & Changes ====
Napoleon's planned invasion of the United Kingdom had been in the works for some time, with the first Army of England gathering on the Channel coast in 1798. Napoleon's concentration on campaigns in Egypt and Austria, and the Peace of Amiens caused these plans to be shelved in 1802. The resumption of hostilities in 1803 led to their revival, and forces were gathered outside Boulogne in large military camps in preparation for the assembling of the invasion flotilla. The Royal Navy was the main obstacle to a successful invasion, but Napoleon declared that his fleet need only be masters of the Channel for six hours and the crossing could be effected. Though the intended departure points were known and were being closely blockaded by the Royal Navy, First Lord of the Admiralty Lord Melville was short of ships. If a combined Franco-Spanish fleet were to force the Navy from its station for even a short while, the French invasion force might succeed in crossing unmolested. The French aimed to achieve at least temporary control of the Channel, while the British aimed to prevent this at all costs.

==== Battle and Campaign ====
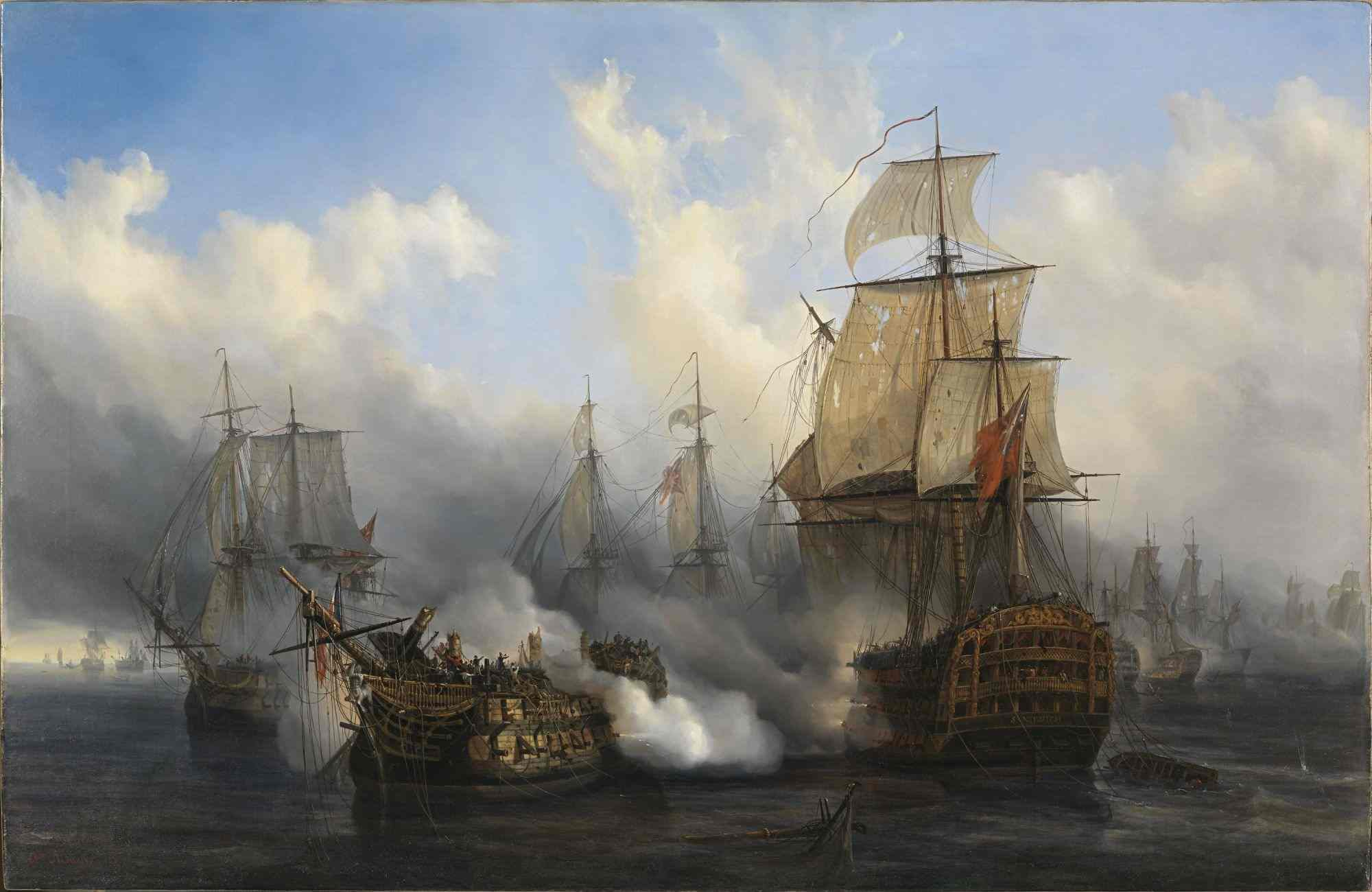
1836 painting of Bucentaure at Trafalgar by Auguste Mayer

Villeneuve's fleet underwent repairs in Cádiz, covered by a hastily assembled blockade of British warships, initially commanded by Rear-Admiral Cuthbert Collingwood, and from 27 September by Vice-Admiral Nelson, who had arrived from England to take command. He spent the following weeks preparing and refining his tactics for the anticipated battle and dining with his captains to ensure they understood his intentions. Nelson had devised a plan of attack that anticipated the allied fleet would form up in a traditional line of battle. Drawing on his own experience from the Nile and Copenhagen, and the examples of Duncan at Camperdown and Rodney at the Saintes, Nelson decided to split his fleet into squadrons rather than forming it into a similar line parallel to the enemy. These squadrons would then cut the enemy's line in a number of places, allowing a pell-mell battle to develop in which the British ships could overwhelm and destroy parts of their opponents' formation, before the unengaged enemy ships could come to their aid.

Napoleon, increasingly dissatisfied with Villeneuve's performance, ordered Vice-Admiral François Rosily to go to Cádiz and take command of the fleet, sail it into the Mediterranean to land troops at Naples, before making port at Toulon. Villeneuve decided to sail the fleet out before his successor arrived. On 20 October the fleet was sighted making its way out of harbour by patrolling British frigates, and Nelson was informed that they appeared to be headed to the west. Nelson led his column of ships into battle aboard HMS Victory, and succeeded in cutting the line and causing the pell-mell battle he desired to break out. After several hours of fighting 17 French and Spanish ships had been captured and another destroyed, without the loss of a single British ship. Nelson was among the 449 British dead, having been mortally wounded by a French sharpshooter during the battle. Nine of the prizes were later scuttled or sunk in a storm that blew up the following day. A sortie led by some of the ships that managed to escape under Julien Cosmao managed to recapture the Spanish Santa Ana, but in doing so he lost three more of his ships, wrecked in the gale, while a fourth was captured by the British, but later wrecked. The British fleet and the surviving French prizes put into Gibraltar over the next few days.^{[e]}

==== Aftermath ====
By early November the combined fleet had been practically destroyed. Two ships of the line had been lost at Finisterre, twenty-one at Trafalgar and in the ensuing storm, and four at Cape Ortegal. No British ships had been lost in these engagements. Many of those that had survived in French or Spanish hands were badly damaged and would not be ready for service for some time. The British victory gave them unchallenged supremacy of the seas, securing British trade and sustaining the Empire.

After 1805 the morale of the French navy was destroyed, while its continued blockade in port robbed it of efficiency and will. While Napoleon returned to the possibility of an invasion some years later, it was never with the same focus or determination. The failure of his navy to fulfil its objectives left him disillusioned, while the timidity of its commanders and the determination of the British to resist them, both factors clearly expressed at various stages throughout the Trafalgar campaign, left the navy with a lack of purpose and direction.

=== After Trafalgar ===
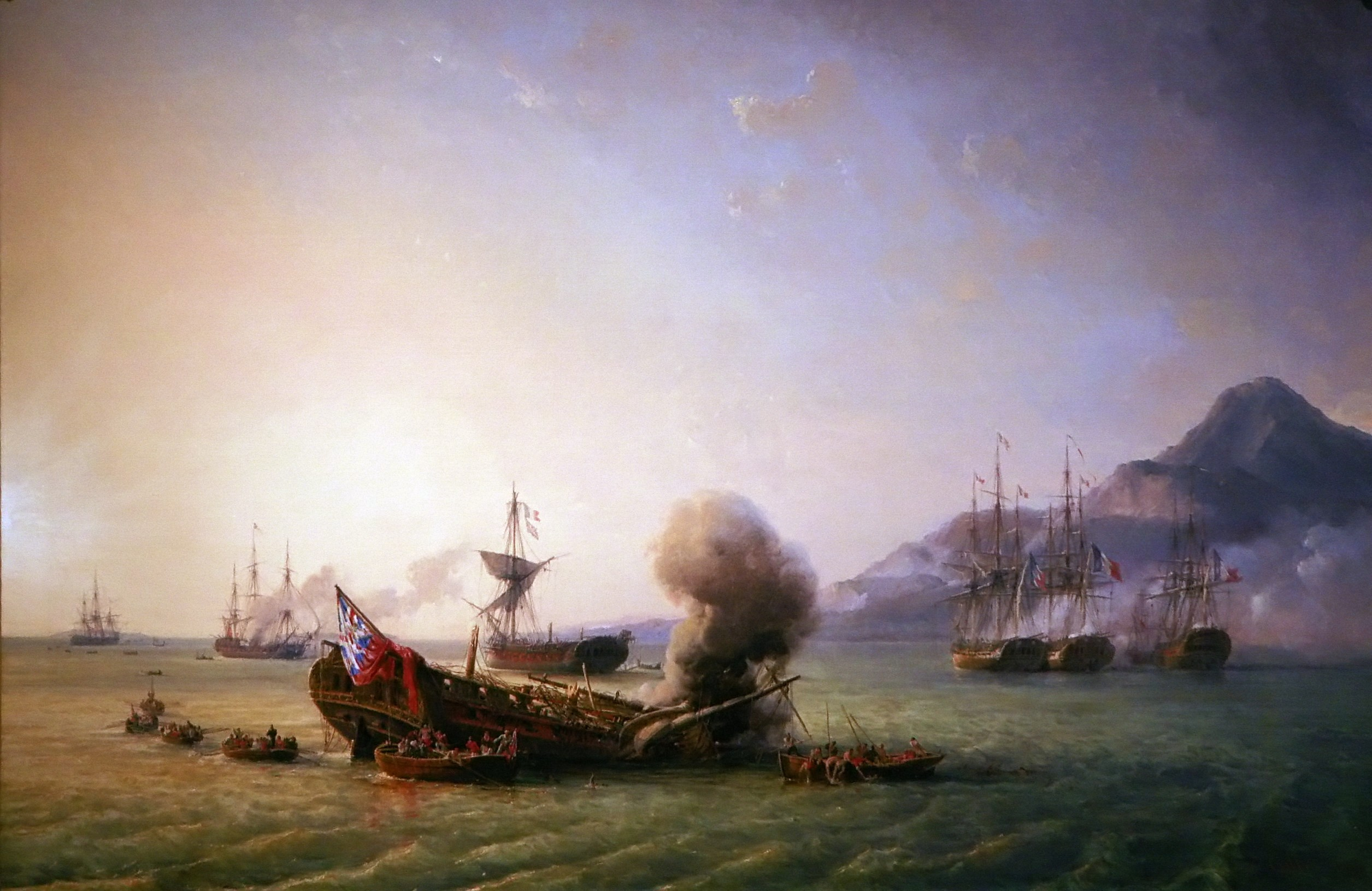
The 1810 Battle of Grand Port, the Imperial Navy's greatest victory over the British

Napoleon found himself with weak and demoralised remnants of a high-seas fleet and flotilla. The Boulogne Flotilla crews had been organised into 14 Crews battalions on 10 August 1805. This time, however, the flotilla was not disbanded and its better gunboats were used for coastal service, escorting convoys of small commercial vessels along the English Channel. Some gunboats might be useful on the coast, but meant nothing against the powerful ships of the British Royal Navy. Napoleon fully understood this and resolved to rebuild the fleet through a large long-term construction programme. Vast sums of money were poured into the great military ports in order to build new ships of the line.

By 1811 the programme was running smoothly and six to seven ships of the line from 74 to 118 guns were launched every year until Napoleon's first abdication in April 1814. The French fleet then had 81 ships of the line with 18 more under construction. There were also about 100 frigates afloat or under construction at that date. But the rapid pace of fleet rebuilding imposed by Napoleon affected the quality and lifespan of the ships, and some of them became unseaworthy only six months after being launched, as a result of the use of newly cut or poor quality timber. In time, given good leadership and opportunity, there is no doubt that this new fleet would have united and challenged the British Royal Navy. Instead, many of these new ships were dispersed or destroyed by the allies as they occupied the French naval bases during the summer of 1814. This third blow–the first had been the Revolution, the second Trafalgar–was to be fatal for the French navy. Not until the second half of the 19th century would France have a powerful battle fleet again.

== Ministers of the Marine ==
Portrait	Minister name (Note: Titles of members are shown as they appear by the end of their term.)	Term		
Portrait	Minister name	Took office	Left office	Time in office
	Denis Decrès	2 December 1804 (Note: Denis Decrès had held this position since 3 October 1801 under the Consulate)	1 April 1814	9 years, 120 days
Portret van Pierre-Victor Malouet met een zicht van het bouwen van schepen onderaan	Pierre Victor, baron Malouet	3 April 1814	11 April 1815 (Note: Malouet would keep the position of Minister of the Navy till 7 September 1814. However, because this went beyond Napoleon's abdication, it is not listed here.)	8 days
	Denis Decrès	20 March 1815	7 July 1815	109 days

== Organisation ==
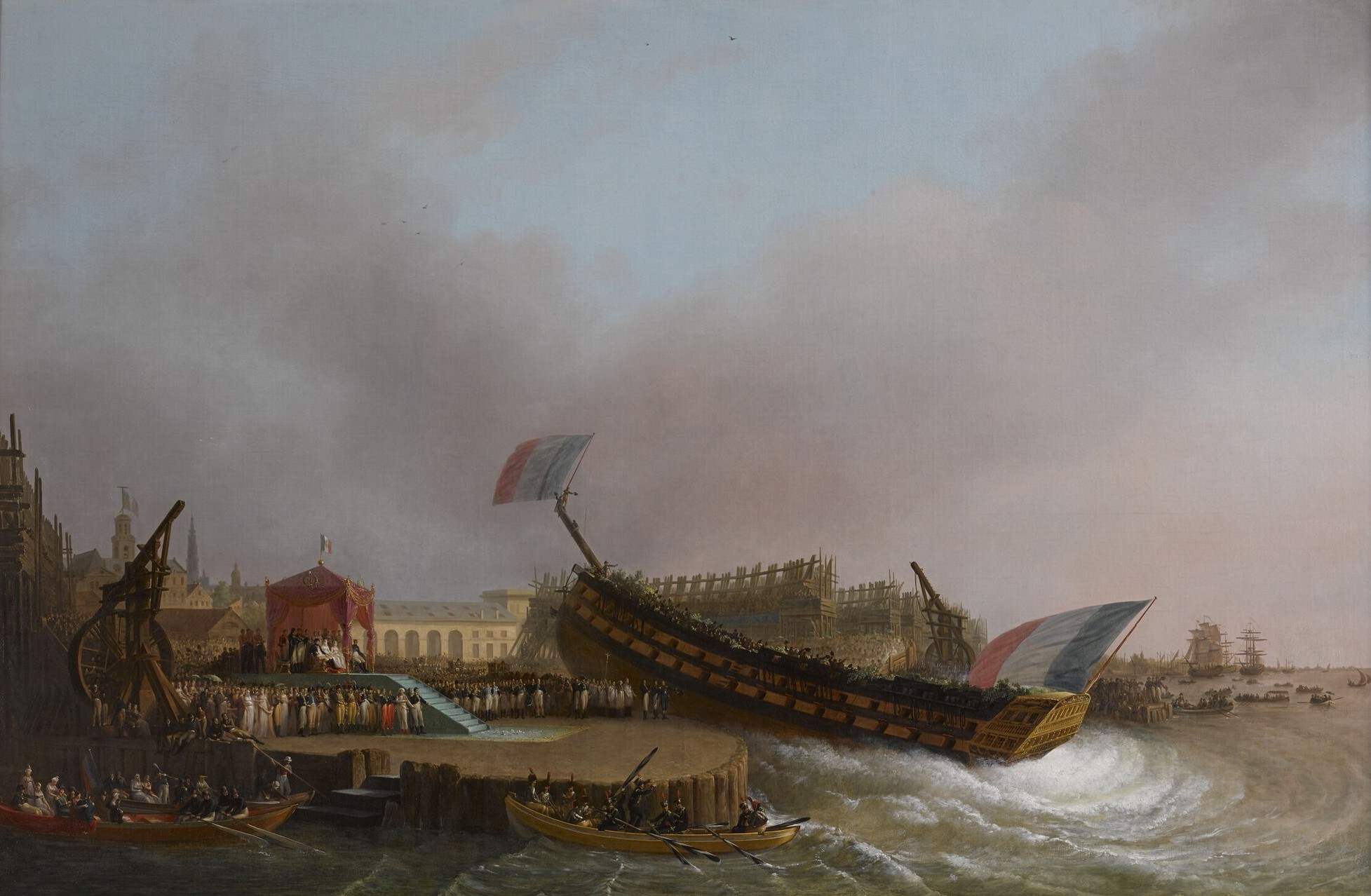
Napoleon and his entourage witnessing the launching of Friedland at Antwerp on 2 May 1810

Because so many formations were formed and disbanded several times, effectively ad-hoc commands, only the permanent or long-lived formations are listed below:

=== Pre-Revolution ===
History of the "Two Fleets System", and the reorganisations into squadrons here.

=== Squadrons ===
- Atlantic Fleet – those squadrons attached to the old Atlantic Fleet
  - Brest Squadron, at the Brest Arsenal, Brest
  - Cherbourg Squadron, at the Cherbourg Arsenal, Cherbourg
  - Escaut Squadron, at the Antwerp Arsenal, Antwerp
  - Lorient Squadron, at the Lorient Arsenal, Lorient
  - Rochefort Squadron, at the Rochefort Arsenal, Rochefort
- Mediterranean Fleet – those squadrons attached to the old Mediterranean Fleet
  - Toulon Squadron, at the Toulon Arsenal, Toulon
  - Aegean Sea Squadron, at Corfu, French Ionian Islands
- Overseas Fleet – those squadrons deployed Overseas to the colonies
  - Windward Islands (West Indies) Squadron, at Fort Saint Louis, Martinique
  - East Indies Ocean (East Indies) Squadron, in Pondichéry, French India

=== Naval Corps ===
The 'Naval Corps' was the name given to the branch of the navy which oversaw the sailors, naval troops, and colonial troops.

== List of ships ==
- List of ships of the line of the First Empire
- List of frigates of the First Empire
