= Jacques Félix Emmanuel Hamelin =

French Navy officer and explorer (1768–1839)

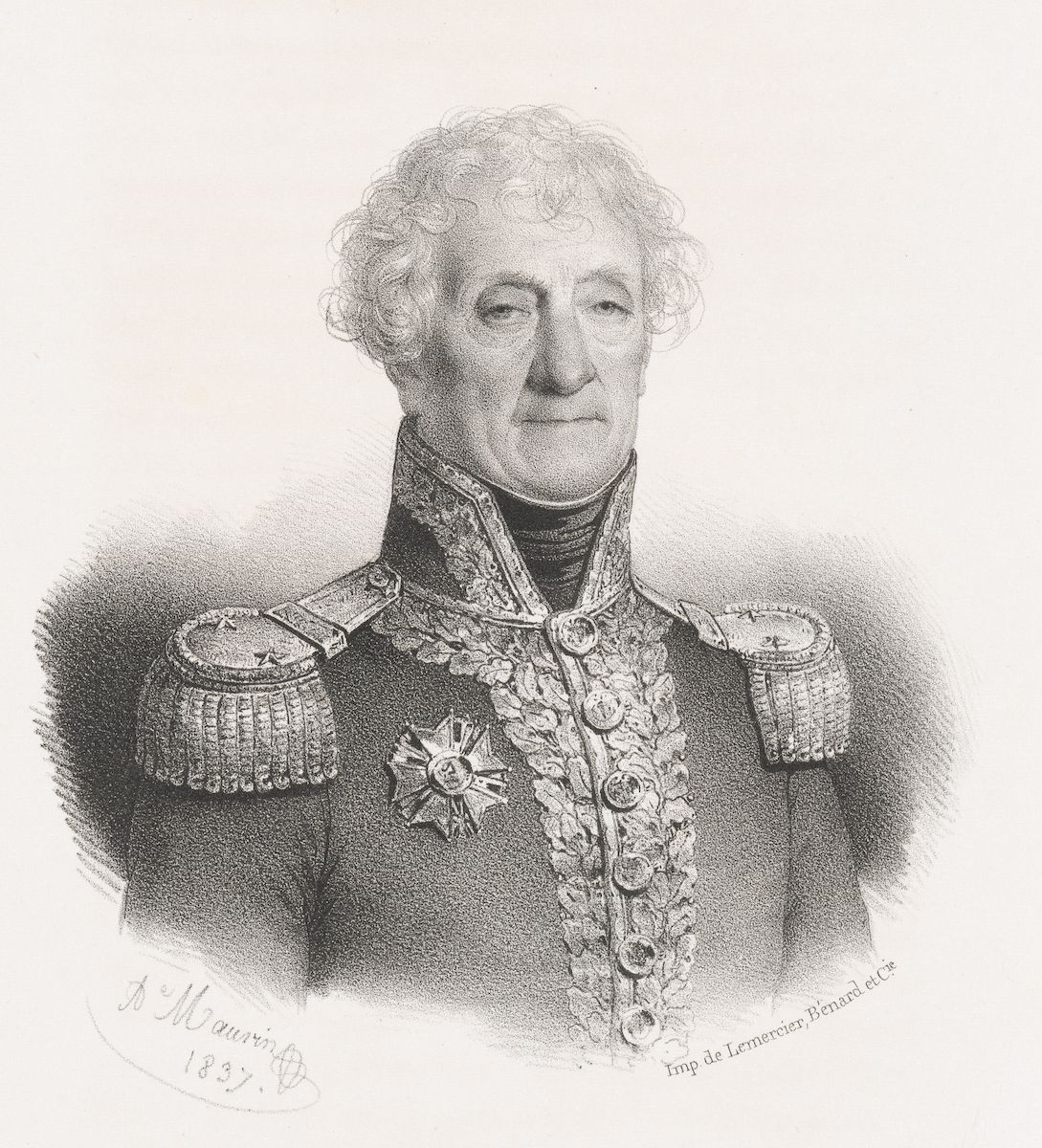
- 1837 lithograph of Hamelin by Antoine Maurin
- Born: 13 October 1768; Honfleur, France
- Died: 23 April 1839 (aged 70); Paris, France
- Burial place: Père Lachaise Cemetery, Paris
- Military career
- Allegiance: French First Republic; First French Empire; Kingdom of France
- Branch: French Navy; French Imperial Navy
- Service years: 1792–1833
- Rank: Counter admiral
- Conflicts: Napoleonic Wars; Action of 18 November 1809; Battle of Grand Port; Action of 18 September 1810 (surrendered)
- Awards: Grand Officer of the Legion of Honour; Baron of the Empire

Counter-Admiral Jacques Félix Emmanuel Hamelin (French pronunciation: [ʒak feliks emanɥɛl amlɛ̃]; 13 October 1768 – 23 April 1839) was a French Navy officer and explorer. He fought in numerous naval engagements during the French Revolutionary and Napoleonic Wars and conducted several exploratory voyages in the Indian Ocean and Southern Ocean. He has his name inscribed on the Arc de Triomphe.

== Early life ==
Hamelin was born in Honfleur, Calvados, France. At age 17, Hamelin embarked on a trade ship belonging to his uncle as a young sailor to learn sailing. In April 1786, he was a crew member of the ship Asie of the merchant marine which was destined for the coast of Angola on a ten-month voyage. He then proceeded to Cherbourg on board the Triton as a helmsman. In July 1788, Hamelin returned to Honfleur, where he embarked as a midshipman on the ship Jeune Mina and voyages on several other vessels.

=== French Navy ===
In 1792, he was conscripted into the French Navy. In August 1792 he was a quartermaster aboard the vessel Entreprenant which was a part of a naval squadron under Counter-admiral Louis-René Levassor de Latouche Tréville. Tréville's squadron joined with another squadron of Admiral Truguet and took part in attacks on the Sardinian municipalities of Oneglia, Cagliari and Nice. In August 1793, Hamelin was named midshipman of the frigate Proserpine, with which he captured the Dutch States Navy frigate Vigilante and part of the convoy she was escorting. He was promoted to lieutenant in August 1795, and on Minerve, took part in the action of 7 March 1795, in which HMS Berwick was captured.

He took part in the Battle of the Levant Convoy, in which Counter-admiral Joseph de Richery's squadron met with a British convoy bound for Smyrna, capturing 30 out of 31 merchant ships, and retaking the 74-gun Censeur. On 21 November 1796, Hamelin was promoted to capitaine de frégate (commander) and took a commission as first officer of Révolution. He took part in the French expedition to support the Irish Rebellion of 1798. Hamelin subsequently took command of the Fraternité for three months, after which took command of Précieuse, part of a squadron under Admiral Eustache Bruix. He then embarked as second-in-command on the Formidable.

== Exploration of the South Seas ==
From 1 October 1800 to 23 June 1803, Hamelin captained the bomb ship Naturaliste, along with Captain Nicolas Baudin on Géographe, on a scientific expedition exploring the South Seas. This voyage was intended as a scientific exploration of New Holland and the charting of the as yet unknown southern coastline. There were no instructions from the French government to claim any land in the name of France. This expedition returned to France the largest collection of plants, animals and seeds from New Holland and Timor that Europe had ever seen, including two short-legged emus from King Island who lived out their days in Josephine's garden.

Baudin rejected ideas amongst his crewmen that they should found a settlement there, and he wrote letters back home to this effect. A party of Hamelin's men discovered a plate, left by Willem de Vlamingh in 1697, which had in turn replaced an earlier plate left by Dirk Hartog in 1616. Hamelin's men initially removed the plate but it was returned on his orders and left intact until a later visit by Louis de Freycinet in 1818. De Freycinet was on Hamelin's 1801 crew. On his return to France, Hamelin was promoted to captaine de vaisseau (captain), and oversaw the weaponry of the fleet intended for Napoleon's planned invasion of the United Kingdom.

=== Mauritius ===
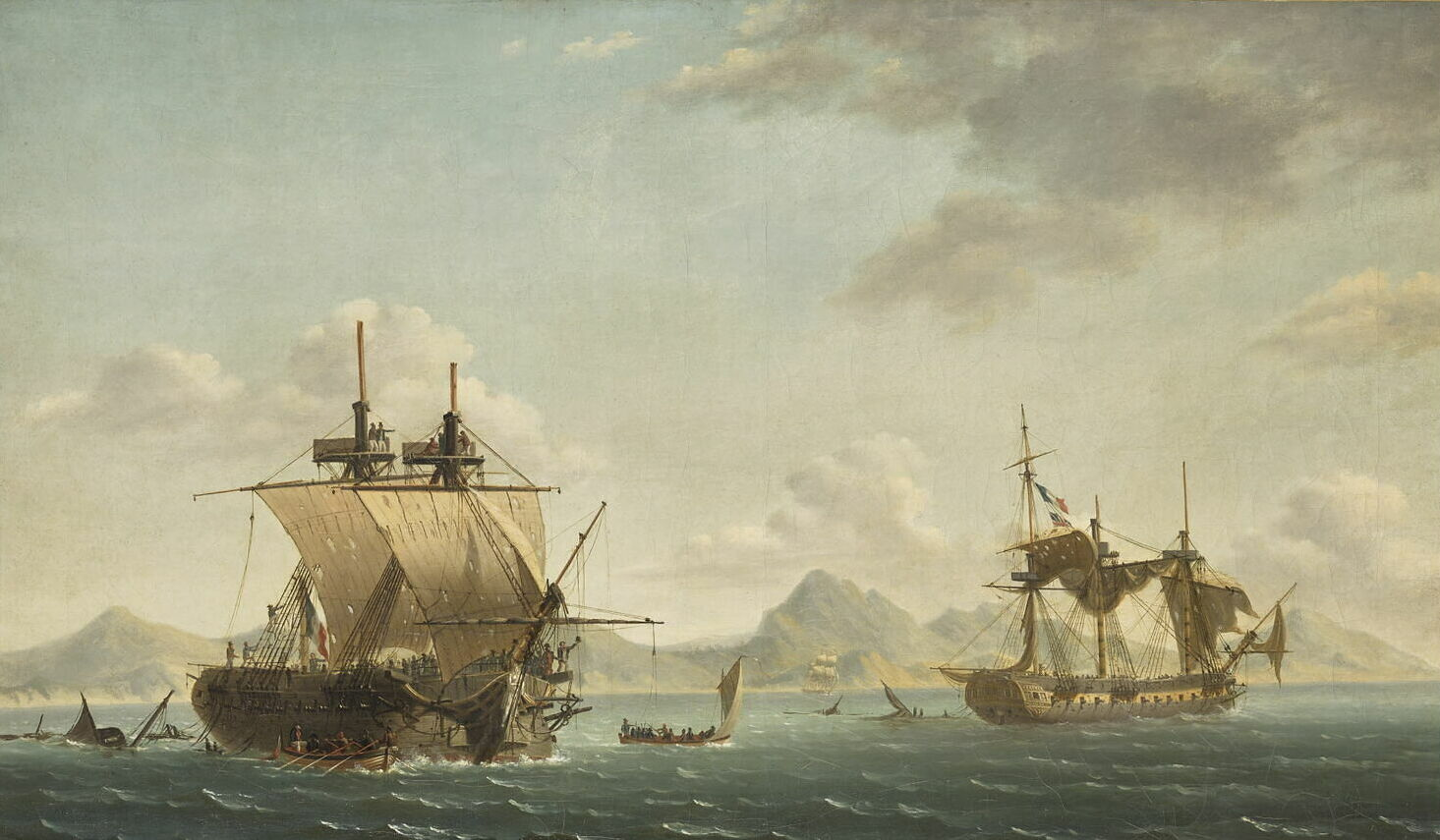
The action of 18 September 1810, where Hamelin was captured

In July 1806, Hamelin took command of the frigate Vénus at Le Havre. He set sail for Isle de France, capturing four British ships along the way. In March 1809, Vénus entered Port Napoléon at the start of the Mauritius campaign of 1809–1811 between France and Britain over French colonies in the Indian Ocean. On 26 April, after orders from the governor of Île-de-France to leave, he sailed off, having under his command Vénus, the frigate Manche, the brig Entreprenant, and the schooner Créole.

He visited Foulpointe on the east coast of Madagascar. Besieged by local Madagascan tribesmen, he sailed for the Bay of Bengal. On the way there, Vénus captured the East India Company (EIC) armed ship Orient on 26 July. Hamelin then turned east in search of more British shipping to attack, capturing several small merchantmen off the Nicobar Islands and destroying the EIC factory at Tappanooly on 10 October. On the return voyage to Mauritius, he captured three EIC East Indiamen in the action of 18 November 1809. On his return trip, Hamelin captured several more British ships, until he encountered HMS Ceylon on 17 September. Ceylon was captured, but the next day a British frigate squadron captured both Ceylon and Vénus.

=== Hero's return ===
Hamelin remained a prisoner of the British for the rest of the year. He was however released in a prisoner exchange, and on his return to France in February 1811 Hamelin was presented to Napoleon and made a Commandeur de la Légion d'honneur, created a Baron of Empire, raised to the rank of counter admiral and named commander of a division of the squadron under the orders of Admiral Édouard Thomas Burgues de Missiessy. In April 1818 he moved to Toulon as general major of the navy, a post that he occupied until 18 May 1822. In early 1823, he was bestowed the rank of Grand Officer de la Légion d'Honneur. In 1832 Baron Hamelin was appointed Inspector General of Marine Crews, and in 1833 he was named Director of Marine Cartography. He retired shortly after, and died in Paris. His nephew was Admiral Ferdinand-Alphonse Hamelin.

== Legacy ==
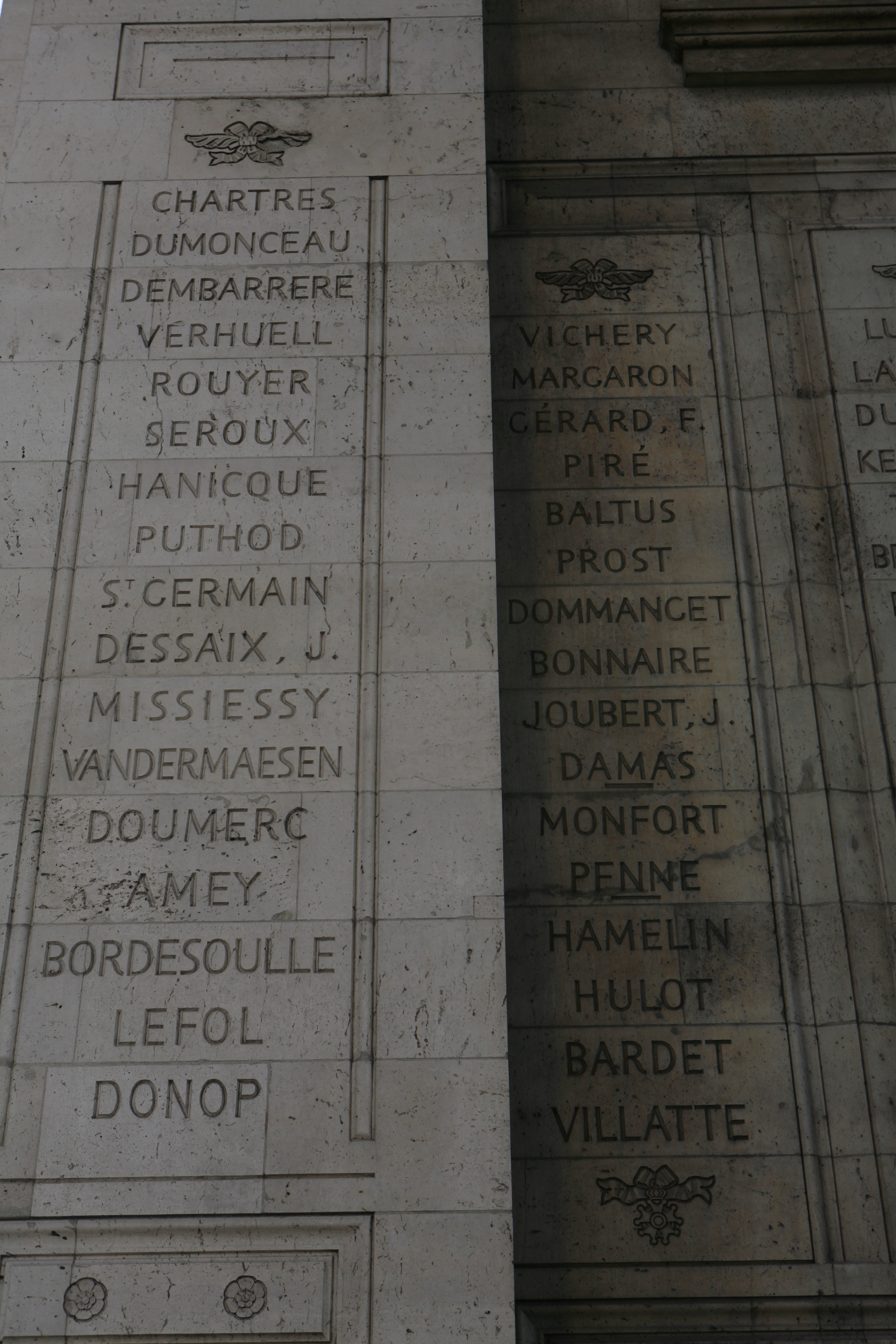
Hamelin's name on the Arc de Triomphe, north pillar

The completion of the hero's welcome in 1811 was that his name was inscribed on the Arc de Triomphe in Paris, on the north pillar, the only naval officer to be so honored from the Napoleonic Wars. He was second in command during the Battle of Grand Port, a naval battle won by the French off the coast of Mauritius. The battle is the only French naval battle to be inscribed on the Arc de Triomphe.

== See also ==
- European and American voyages of scientific exploration
- Cape Leeuwin
- Cape Naturaliste
- Geographe Bay
- Hamelin Bay
