= French brig Créole =

Créole
History

France
- Name: Créole
- Builder: Île de France
- Launched: 1808
- Commissioned: 1 January 1809
- Fate: Wrecked 30 November 1823

General characteristics
- Displacement: 53 tonnes
- Armament: 10 × 12-pounder carronades

Créole was a three-masted schooner sloop-of-war of the French Navy.

On 26 April 1809, she left île de France under Captain Bouvet, part of Hamelin's squadron. She sailed to Manilla, where she captured a British and a Portuguese prize. She took part in the re-captured of Foulpointe settlement. In October 1809, she seized and destroyed the British settlement of Tapanoolie, near Sumatra. She took part in the action of 18 November 1809, before returning to Île de France. There, she was converted to a brig.

She sailed to Saint Helena in 1811, and returned to Brest in 1812.

She was wrecked in Senegal on 30 November 1823.

== Sources and references ==
- Roche, Jean-Michel (2005). Dictionnaire des bâtiments de la flotte de guerre française de Colbert à nos jours 1 1671 - 1870. p. 134. ISBN 978-2-9525917-0-6. OCLC 165892922. (Group Retozel-Maury Millau)
