= French ship Charlemagne =

Three ships of the French Navy have borne the name Charlemagne in honour of Charlemagne

== Ships named Charlemagne ==
- Charlemagne (1807), a 74-gun ship of the line
- Charlemagne (1851), an 80-gun ship of the line
- French battleship Charlemagne, a pre-dreadnought battleship
Ships of the French Navy named Charlemagne
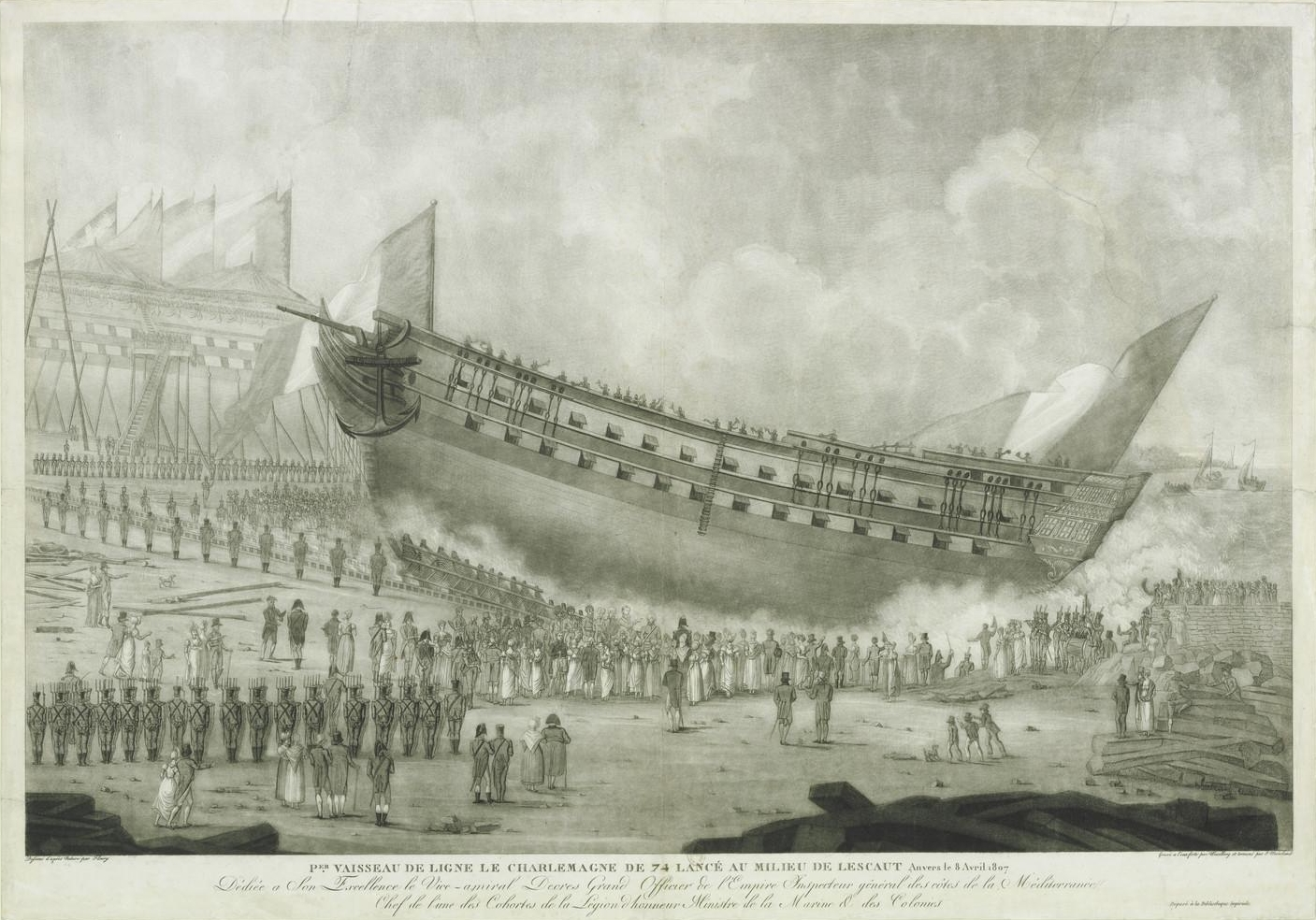
Launch of Charlemagne (1807)

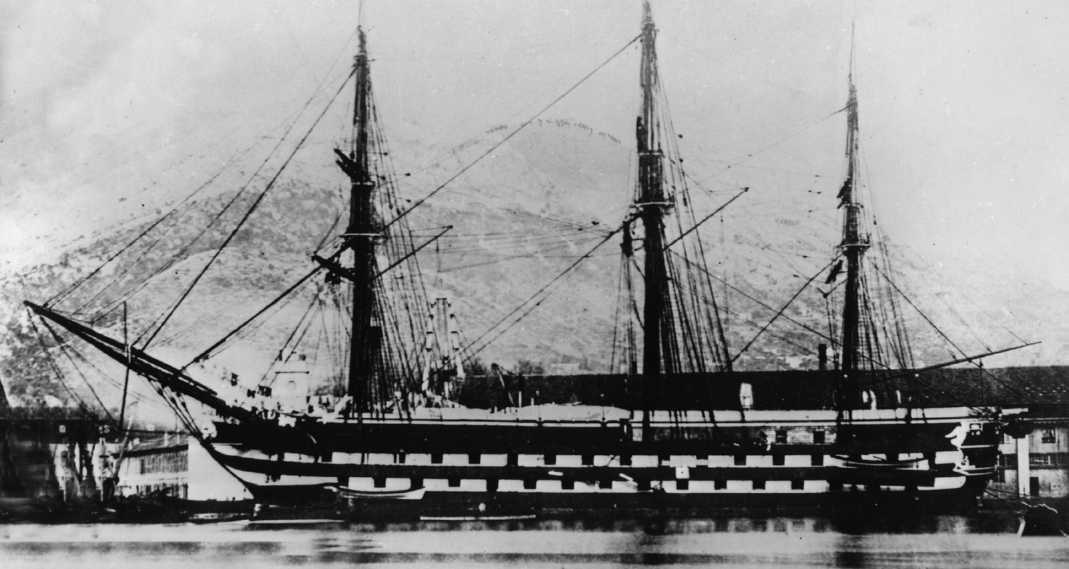
Portrait of Charlemagne (1851)

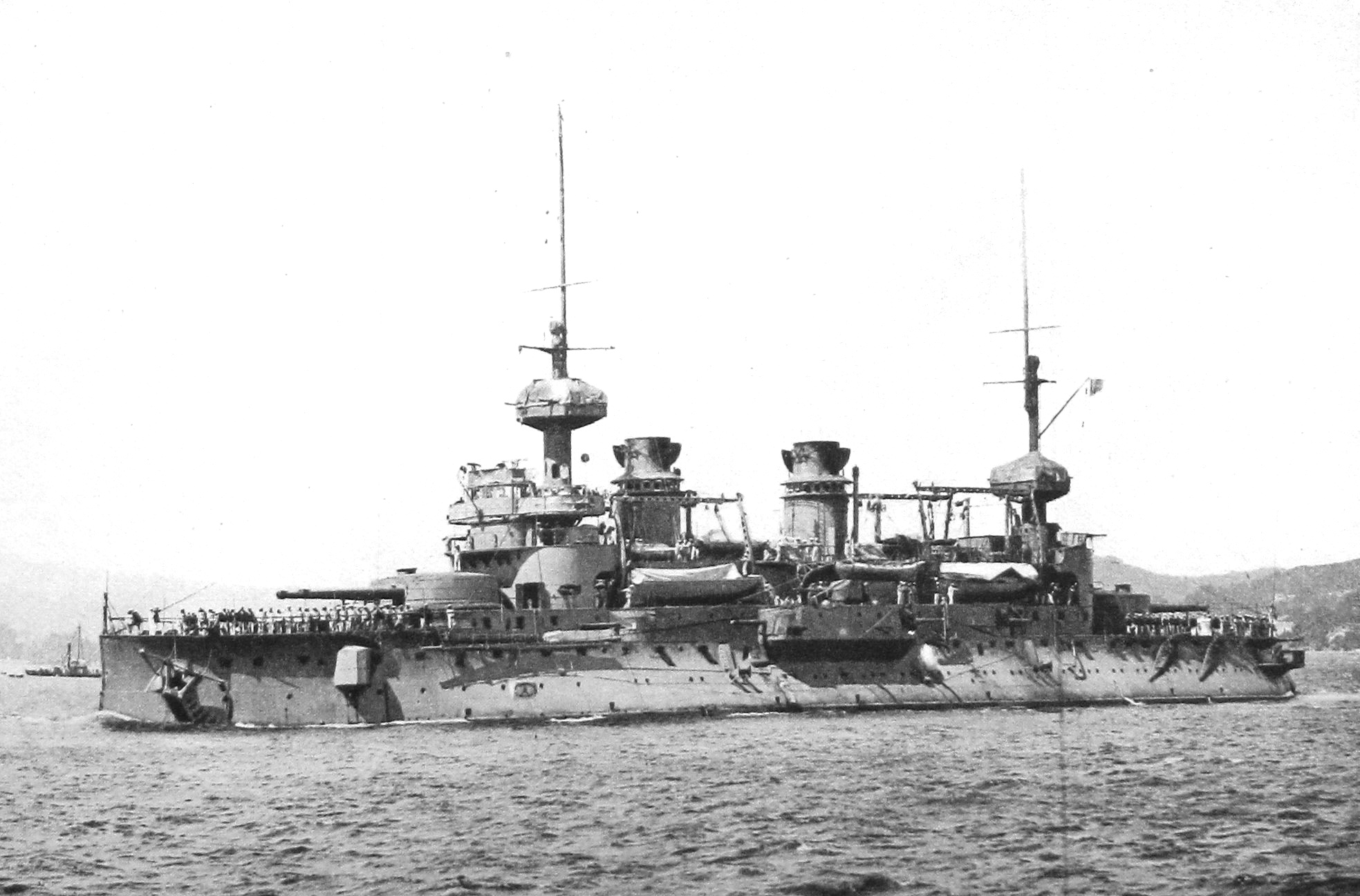
The battleship Charlemagne underway
