= Action of 6 April 1809 =

Naval battle of the French Revolutionary Wars

- Part of the Napoleonic Wars
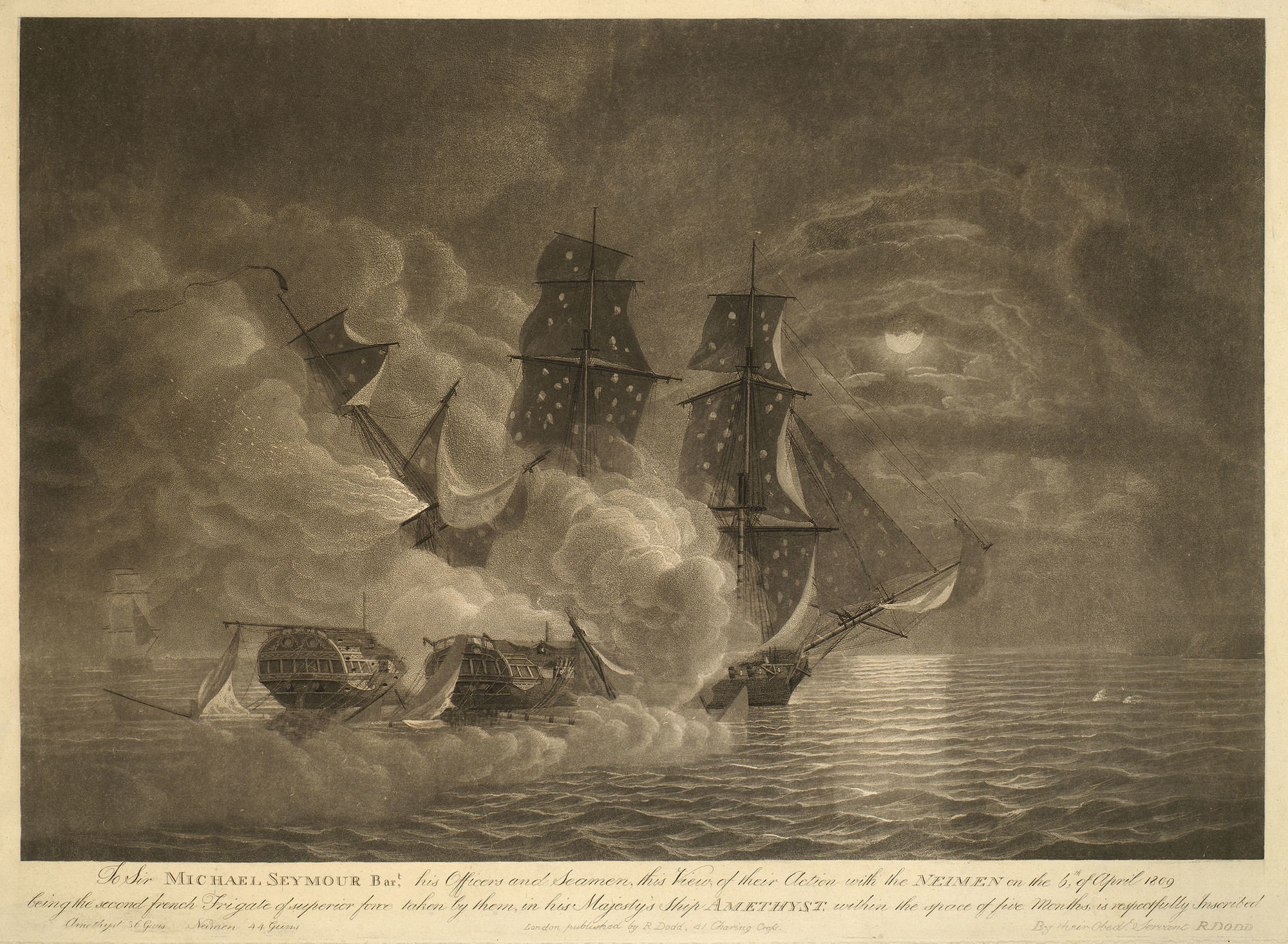
- Engraving of the battle by Robert Dodd
Date	6 April 1809
Location	Bay of Biscay, off Northern Spain
Result	British victory

Belligerents
United Kingdom	(France) French Empire

Commanders and leaders
Michael Seymour	Jean Dupotet

Strength
Frigate HMS Amethyst, with HMS Emerald and Arethusa in support	Frigate Niémen

Casualties and losses
8 killed, 38 wounded	47 killed, 73 wounded, Niémen captured

The action of 6 April 1809 was a small naval battle fought between the French frigate Niémen and several British frigates, principally HMS Amethyst, as part of the blockade of Brest, France, during the Napoleonic Wars. During the Wars, a central part of British strategy was to isolate French ports from international trade in an attempt to both restrict French imports of food and military supplies and simultaneously to damage the French economy. To achieve this, British warships maintained a constant vigil off the French coastline, attacking ships that attempted to enter or leave French ports. Despite the threat that their ships faced, communication and the transfer of supplies between France and her colonies was vital to the French war effort, and the French Navy made constant attempts to evade the patrolling British squadrons. In late 1808, a significant French squadron was deployed to Isle de France (now Mauritius) to disrupt British trade in the Indian Ocean. This force required reinforcement and supply from France, and periodic attempts were made to reach the isolated convoy with new frigates, the first of which was Niémen.

Niémen was a new and fast ship, carrying 40 guns and a large quantity of much needed naval supplies. However, in order to leave her home port of Brest, it was necessary to avoid contact with the British frigates that constantly watched the entrance to the harbour in search of enemy movement. In April 1809, these ships were HMS Amethyst and Emerald, loosely supported by other patrolling ships and tasked specifically with the capture of Niémen, acting on intelligence passed on by the Admiralty. When Niémen emerged on 5 April, she was immediately spotted and chased. Amethyst retained contact throughout the night and brought the French ship to action on the morning of 6 April. The ensuing battle was fiercely contested and both ships suffered severe damage and heavy casualties.

While the outcome of the battle was still undecided, a second British frigate—HMS Arethusa—arrived. Outnumbered, the French captain saw no alternative and surrendered his ship. The late arrival of Arethusa—under Captain Robert Mends, who claimed the victory for himself—sparked a furious argument that developed into a lasting animosity between Mends and Captain Michael Seymour of Amethyst. The failure of Niémen to reach Isle de France also had serious repercussions for the French squadron there. With naval supplies severely limited, their ability to operate at sea for long periods of time was hampered and by late 1810 few of their vessels were still seaworthy.

== Background ==
During the Napoleonic Wars, as with the French Revolutionary Wars that preceded them, the British Royal Navy enjoyed almost complete dominance at sea. By 1809, their superiority was so entrenched that few French ships even left port, because to do so meant breaking through a system of blockading warships off every major French harbour. The biggest port in France at the time was Brest in Brittany, and thus it was there that the greatest concentration of British warships off the French coast was concentrated. The main squadron was formed from large ships of the line, often dubbed the "Offshore Squadron" due to their position up to a hundred miles from the coast, to avoid the risks posed by the rocky Biscay shore. This was complemented by the "Inshore Squadron", formed primarily from frigates and brigs, which was tasked with watching the myriad entry points to Brest and other Biscay ports. These frigates often sailed independently or in small squadrons, maintaining contact with each other and with the Offshore Squadron via signals and despatch boats.

Despite their inferiority at sea, both in numbers and experience, frigates of the French Navy were still required to leave port regularly on raiding missions against British commerce and to convoy supplies and reinforcements to overseas regions of the French Empire. These colonies formed bases for French commerce raiders, and in 1808 a determined effort was made to develop a raiding squadron on the French Indian Ocean territories of Isle de France and Île Bonaparte. These ships—led by Commodore Jacques Hamelin—required regular resupply from France as they were unable to repair damage and replenish ammunition and food from the reserves on the Indian Ocean islands alone. In early 1809, therefore, it was decided to reinforce and resupply the squadron by despatching the newly built frigate Niémen from Brest under Captain Jean Dupotet.

In January 1809, John Tremayne Rodd—captain of the frigate HMS Indefatigable, then part of the Inshore Squadron—obtained information that Niémen was preparing to sail from Brest. Rodd passed this information to the Admiralty, who took immediate steps to intercept the French ship. For this purpose, they selected Captains Michael Seymour of HMS Amethyst and Frederick Lewis Maitland of HMS Emerald. These captains had extensive experience serving with the Inshore Squadron off Brest and Seymour, who had lost an arm at the Glorious First of June, was much in favour for his recent capture of the French frigate Thétis at the action of 10 November 1808. Seymour and Maitland—during their patrols in 1808 that led to the capture of Thétis—had entered into a verbal agreement that any prize money they earned would be shared equally over both crews. This agreement continued on their new commission, which was jealously guarded from other captains: when Seymour discovered HMS Naiad hunting in the same area in March, he was furious and ordered her away.

== Battle ==
On 3 April 1809, Niémen—laden with provisions and naval stores for Isle de France—sailed from Brest, passing through the rocky passages that sheltered the port during the night and thus avoiding discovery by the regular Inshore Squadron. Steering westwards, Dupotet made good time, travelling nearly 100 nmi (120 mi; 190 km) over the next two days with the intention of escaping the British patrols in the Bay of Biscay and reaching the open Atlantic. At 11:00 on 5 April, however, Dupotet spotted two sails to the northwest. Assuming them to be British, Dupotet turned southwards in the hope of outrunning them. The sails—which belonged to Amethyst and Emerald—immediately gave chase. Throughout the day, the three ships sailed southward, Amethyst slightly gaining on Niémen but leaving Emerald far behind, Maitland's ship disappearing from view at 19:20 as darkness fell.

Dupotet attempted to throw off Amethyst's pursuit during the night by turning westwards once more, but Seymour anticipated this manoeuvre and turned his ship westwards as well, discovering Niémen only a few miles ahead at 21:40. Rapidly gaining on the French ship, Seymour began firing his bow-chasers, small guns situated in the bows of the frigate, in an attempt to damage her rigging so that he could bring his broadsides to bear. Dupotet responded with his stern-chasers, but by 01:00 on 6 April it was clear that Amethyst was going to catch the French frigate. The pursuit had been exhausting: since first sighting the British ships, Niémen had travelled over 140 nmi (160 mi; 260 km) and was just 12 nmi (14 mi; 22 km) from the Spanish coast when she was caught. At 01:15, Amethyst opened fire, Niémen immediately responding and turning to the northeast in an attempt to shake off the British ship. Seymour followed his opponent and at 01:45 was again close enough to engage, the frigates firing upon one another from close range for over an hour.

At 02:45, Amethyst was able to pull across the bows of Niémen, inflicting a devastating raking fire on the French ship which caused terrible damage. Niémen surged forward into Amethyst, but the collision caused little damage and at 03:00 Amethyst again raked her opponent, this time from the east. The frigates were so close that shot from Amethyst started fires among Niémen's hammock netting, placed along the decks to deter boarding actions. At 03:15, Niémen's mizzenmast and main topmast collapsed and another fire broke out in the main top, but Amethyst was also severely damaged and at 03:30 her mainmast fell onto the deck from a combination of shot damage and stress in high winds. Niémen's mainmast also collapsed a few minutes later. Both frigates had stopped firing at 03:25, as the confusion on their decks was brought under control.

Although Niémen was very badly damaged, Amethyst was almost uncontrollable and despite Seymour's best efforts, he was unable to close with Niémen to ensure her surrender. Dupotet meanwhile was overseeing hasty repairs in the hope of getting away before Amethyst could recover. At 03:45, however, a new ship emerged from the darkness, soon revealed to be the British frigate HMS Arethusa. Arethusa was deployed as part of the force blockading the ports of Northern Spain and her commander, Captain Robert Mends, was a successful officer who had been commended just two weeks earlier for raiding the French-held port of Lekeitio. Mends immediately pulled alongside Niémen and Dupotet fired a single shot each at Amethyst and Arethusa. The shot at Amethyst missed its target, but the one at Arethusa struck the ship and threw up splinters. Mends was struck on the forehead and badly wounded, the only man to be hit. Both Amethyst and Arethusa then opened fire, Niémen surrendering immediately.

== Aftermath ==
Aside from Captain Mends on Arethusa, casualties were severe on both sides. Amethyst had eight killed and 37 wounded from a crew of 222, while the French ship lost 47 killed and 73 wounded from a crew of 339. Recriminations among the British officers began within minutes of the French surrender: Mends took possession of Niémen and sent a note to Seymour informing him that he had seized the valuable French nautical charts and the French captain's personal stores. The note also requested that Seymour send back Arethusa's surgeon, who had gone aboard Amethyst to assist with the wounded, so that Mends could be ready to leave without notice. Seymour, who was still effecting hasty repairs and dealing with his casualties, responded angrily, forcing Mends to back down and return the stores. Seymour was also annoyed by Mends' late arrival, which meant that Arethusa was entitled to half the prize money from the captured frigate without having done any of the fighting. Repairs were completed on 7 April, and Amethyst and Niémen limped back to Plymouth, arriving on 13 April.

On arrival in Britain, Seymour was celebrated and rewarded with a baronetcy for his second victory in less than six months while all of his officers were promoted. Niémen was purchased into the Navy for the sum of £29,979-2-10d, which was split between the government, the crew and a number of other parties. The share that went to the captors came under dispute: Mends had no intention of abiding by Seymour's agreement with Maitland and refused to allow Emerald to share in the prize money. Seymour and Maitland took Mends to court and the ensuing legal battle lasted years, Mends deliberately exaggerating his role in the capture of Niémen in public (although privately admitting that the victory was entirely Seymour's). Seymour and Mends became bitter enemies and their animosity continued throughout their lives, although both remained in the Navy and had successful careers. Forty years later, the battle was among the actions recognised by a clasp attached to the Naval General Service Medal, awarded upon application to all British participants still living in 1847.

In France, the action was infamous for a despatch supposedly sent by Dupotet and subsequently printed in edited form in the newspaper Le Moniteur Universel. The report, which was later used by Mends in his dispute with Seymour, claimed that Niémen had not only been largely undamaged before Arethusa's arrival, but that Seymour had actually surrendered to the French captain before Mends arrived. This story, almost totally invented, was widely believed in France at the time. The effect on the Mauritius campaign of the defeat of Niémen was not immediately apparent, Hamelin's squadron remaining a menace to British shipping well into 1810. However, in the aftermath of the destructive Battle of Grand Port, the French, although the victors, were unable to repair their ships due to lack of naval stores and their effectiveness declined until they were unable to resist the Invasion of Isle de France in November 1810. This inability was directly related to the failure of all but one of the French frigates sent to reinforce and resupply the island to reach it, the others either captured or driven back en route.
