= Jean Dupotet =

Jean Henri Joseph Dupotet
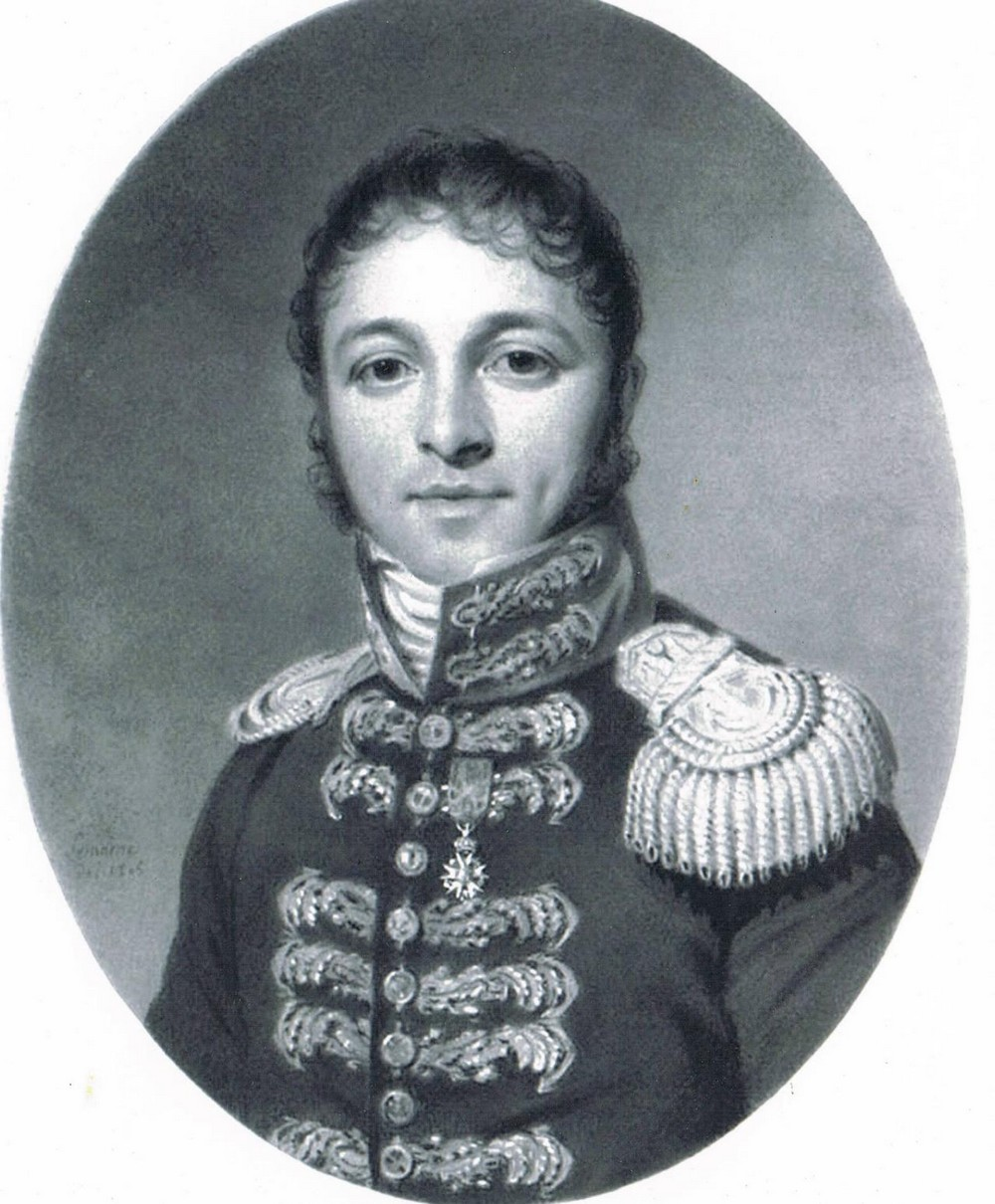
- Jean Dupotet as a Commander
- Born: 17 December 1777; Chaugey
- Died: 9 January 1852 (aged 74); Paris
- Military career
- Rank: Vice admiral
- Conflicts: Battle of Trafalgar; Action of 6 April 1809
- Awards: grand Officier de la légion militaire de Saint-Louis

Jean Henri Joseph Dupotet (French pronunciation: [ʒɑ̃ ɑ̃ʁi ʒozɛf dypotɛ]; 17 December 1777, in Chaugey – 9 January 1852, in Paris) was a French navy commander who participated in the Battle of Trafalgar as a young lieutenant and later became a vice-admiral.

== Career ==
Dupotet was born the first son of a 10-sibling family. He joined the Navy as a sailor at age 16. From May 1795, he served aboard the 32-gun Alceste. Dupotent distinguished himself on 7 August 1795, when the squadron of Alceste attacked and captured the 74-gun HMS Berwick. He was promoted to midshipman 3rd class and transferred to the Unité.

On 20 April 1796, Unité was captured at Annaba by HMS Inconstant, and Dupotet was taken prisoner.

Returned to France, he was promoted to ensign on 3 March 1798. He took part in the Cruise of Bruix, and served on the Argonaute for a campaign at the Leeward Islands.

Upon his return, he was promoted to lieutenant, and served as second in command aboard the Redoutable, taking part in the Battle of Trafalgar, where he was taken prisoner. Released after the battle, he was promoted to frigate captain and served as an aide to Denis Decrès.

In 1807, he commanded the Charlemagne and Flushing harbour. In 1809, he took command of the 44-gun Niémen, bound for Bordeaux, only to run into a British frigate squadron blockading Brest. In the resulting Action of 6 April 1809, Niémen was captured and Dupotet taken prisoner again.

Dupotet remained a prisoner for 5 years before returning to France at the Bourbon restoration. In July 1815, he was given command of the Flore. He subsequently commanded the Gloire and the Jeanne d'Arc, flagship of the Caribbean squadron.

From 1830 and 1834, by then a rear-admiral, Dupotet was governor of Martinique.

In 1839, he commanded the French blockade of the Río de la Plata, and negotiated with Juan Manuel de Rosas the next year. He is mentioned in the correspondence of Charles Darwin.

Dupotet was promoted to vice-admiral in 1841, and served as general inspector of the harbours of the Atlantic from 1844. He retired in 1845 and died seven years later. He is buried in Père Lachaise Cemetery (39th Division, 9th rank, M, 31).
