= Thomas Ussher =

British Naval Officer

Rear-Admiral Sir Thomas Ussher KCH CB
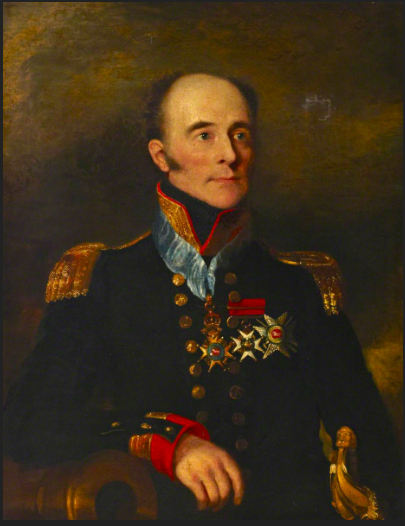
- Portrait of Sir Thomas Ussher by Andrew Morton
- Born: 1779; Dublin, Ireland
- Died: 6 January 1848 (aged 68–69); Queenstown, Ireland
- Military career
- Allegiance: United Kingdom
- Branch: Royal Navy
- Service years: 1791–1848
- Rank: Rear-Admiral
- Commands: HM hired armed cutter Nox; HM hired armed cutter Joseph; HM hired armed brig Colpoys; HMS Redwing; HMS Leyden; HMS Hyacinth; HMS Euryalus; HMS Undaunted; HMS Duncan; Commodore-Superintendent, Bermuda Dockyard; Commander-in-Chief at Cork Station
- Conflicts: French Revolutionary Wars; Napoleonic Wars

Rear-Admiral Sir Thomas Ussher KCH CB (1779 – 6 January 1848) was an Anglo-Irish officer of the British Royal Navy who served with distinction during the French Revolutionary and Napoleonic Wars, and who in 1814 conveyed Napoleon Bonaparte into exile in Elba. He was nicknamed Undaunted Ussher.

== Biography ==
=== Origins ===
Thomas Ussher was born in Dublin, the son of Henry Ussher, the Andrews Professor of Astronomy at Trinity College, and Mary Burne. The Usshers were originally a Norman family named Nevill, one of which having come to Ireland with King John, took the surname Ussher from his official position.

=== Early career ===
Thomas Ussher entered the Royal Navy on 27 January 1791 at the age of 12 as a midshipman on board the 24-gun sixth-rate Squirrel, under the command of Captain William O'Bryen Drury. He served in Irish waters, then took part in an expedition to the Bight of Benin.

In September 1793 he joined the 74-gun Invincible under Captain The Hon. Thomas Pakenham. Invincible was present in the battle of the Glorious First of June, 1794, during which Ussher took part in the capture of the French 80-gun ship Juste, subsequently serving aboard her for a year in the English Channel. In October 1795 he was transferred to the Prince George (98), the flagship of Sir Hugh Cloberry Christian, for an expedition to the West Indies. The first attempt was aborted after violent storms forced the fleet to return to port. A second attempt in November aboard Glory (98) was also frustrated by bad weather, and Ussher finally sailed in March 1796 aboard the Thunderer (74). On the outward passage, he was transferred with Sir Hugh to the frigate Astraea.

=== In the West Indies ===
During operations in May 1796 against Saint Lucia, Ussher, who had been appointed acting-lieutenant of the Minotaur (74), under Captain Thomas Louis, was employed on shore in command of a party of seamen attached to the army under Sir Ralph Abercromby.

He was promoted to lieutenant on 17 July, and following the surrender of the island, was appointed to the 18-gun brig Pelican, serving under a series of captains; John Clarke Searle, Thomas Harvey, Edward Kittoe, John Gascoyne, John Hamstead, Christopher Laroche, and Robert Philpot.

On 23 September 1796, while under the command of Captain Searle, the Pelican, with only 97 men on board, fought off the 32-gun Médée near La Désirade, in a close action. The Médée sustained losses of 33 men killed and wounded, while the Pelican, although her sails and rigging were cut to pieces, had only one man slightly wounded. Later the same day Pelican retook the Alcyon, a British army victualler which had been captured by the Médée. Ussher was given command of her, but on the 24th the Alcyon was recaptured by the French close to Guadeloupe; and he was for a short time detained as a prisoner.

Ussher rejoined the Pelican on 27 September 1797, and took part, while the ship was under the temporary command of Lieutenant Thomas White, in the destruction of Le Trompeur, a French privateer of 16 guns and 160 men, not far from Santo Domingo. The vessel was engaged by Pelican for 35 minutes before attempting to escape, but was overtaken and sunk. Only 60 of her crew were saved.

On 2 April 1798 Ussher was sent out in command of two boats containing 14 men to search various creeks in Cumberland Harbour and St. Jago de Cuba for a privateer which had been raiding the coast of Jamaica. On the 4th Ussher landed in a sandy bay near St. Jago to rest when his men were suddenly attacked by a force of 60 to 70 soldiers. Under a volley of musket fire Ussher, though slightly wounded, succeeded in reaching a boat and returned fire with a swivel loaded with 200 musket-balls. The enemy fled; and the British, having 2 killed and 10 wounded, also retired.

The next day, 5 April, while reconnoitring the mouth of the river Augustine, near Cumberland Harbour, he observed the French privateer schooner, Le Moulin a Cafe, of 7 guns and 83 men, which was lying across the stream, with her bows apparently aground and most of her crew on shore. He attempted to capture her, but the crew boarded as he approached, and using hawsers hauled the schooner into the river channel. Ussher called on them to surrender, and received a broadside in reply. He attempted to board under cover of the smoke, anticipating reinforcements from the Pelican, but was shot through the right thigh. Seeing that the attempt was a failure he ordered his men to retreat, then fainted from loss of blood. On recovering he found himself for a second time in the hands of the French.

For several months after his return to the Pelican, his wound meant that Ussher was on crutches, but despite this in January 1799 he volunteered to take Pelican's cutter and 12 men in an attack on another privateer, La Trompeuse, of 5 guns and about 70 men, lying in the Artibonite River, in the west of Santo Domingo. The privateer was boarded, and found to be fast aground, so was destroyed. This was only one of more than 20 boat engagements in which Ussher was present while aboard the Pelican.

In May 1799 Ussher joined the 36-gun frigate Trent, under Captain Robert Waller Otway. On 7 June he boarded a schooner moored in Aguada Bay, Puerto Rico, under the guns of a large battery. Having towed the prize out while under fire, he then returned and also brought out a felucca.

In July 1799 he commanded the boats in the capture of a Spanish vessel at Laguira having entered the port in an attempt to retake the British frigate Hermione, which unfortunately had sailed a few days previously. He subsequently captured a felucca found lying under a small battery on the north side of Puerto Rico.

In September 1800 Trent returned to England with Admiral Sir Hyde Parker aboard, and Ussher, still suffering from the effects of his wounds, was obliged to go on to half-pay. Although the College of Surgeons assessed his injuries as equal to the loss of a limb, he was unable to procure any compensation. Ussher applied for employment in June 1801, against the advice of his doctors, and was appointed to command the cutter Nox, stationed off Weymouth in attendance upon the King, where he remained four months.

=== Blockade of France and northern Spain ===
He remained unemployed during the peace of Amiens, but on 26 September 1803 was appointed to command of the cutter Joseph. On 6 April 1804 he was appointed to command of the hired armed brig Colpoys, of fourteen 12-pounder carronades and a crew of 40, which was attached to Admiral William Cornwallis's blockading force off Brest.

Towards the end of 1804 Ussher was assigned to be the second-in-command to Captain Peter Puget in a proposed operation to destroy the fleet at Brest by means of fire ships. However a succession of winter gales blew the British fleet from the coast; and on regaining his station Cornwallis was in some doubt as to whether or not the enemy had left port. Ussher, of his own accord, that night sailed inshore and took his gig (a 4-oared boat) into the harbour and rowed along the whole French line, gaining an precise knowledge of the enemy's force, which consisted of 21 ships. Inevitably, his boat was eventually spotted, but he escaped, pursued by numerous enemy boats. The next day Colpoys joined the British squadron flying the signal "The enemy the same as when last reconnoitred". His next exploit was to land at midnight with only six men, not more than 200 yards from Fort de Bertheaume, where he captured a signal-post, and a copy of the French private signals.

On 21 March 1806, he captured three Spanish luggers under a battery of six 24-pounders in the port of Avilés. On 19 April 1806, 24 men from Colpoys and the gun-brig Attack, under Lieutenant Thomas Swain, landed at the entrance of the river Doelan, spiked two guns of a battery, and captured two chasse-marées.

Soon afterwards, with the gun-brig Haughty and cutter Frisk under his orders, he volunteered to cut out a French frigate lying at San Sebastián, but was prevented by contrary winds from reaching the port before the ship had sailed.

With the same vessels, and the schooner Felix, he destroyed several batteries at St. Antonio, Avilés, and Bermeo, and on 28 July 1806, he captured the town of Ea. However less than a week later he was obliged to resign command of Colpoys, as his leg wound had broken out afresh.

Backed by testimonials from Admirals St. Vincent, Cornwallis and Graves, on 18 October 1806 he was promoted to the command of the brig-sloop Redwing of 18 guns. His conduct at Avilés had previously obtained for him a sword valued at £50 from the Patriotic Society; and he had the satisfaction of receiving from the crew of the Colpoys a similar token of their "respect and esteem."

=== Gibraltar ===
While commanding Redwing he was chiefly employed in protecting merchant ships against Spanish gun-boats and privateers near Gibraltar. In March 1807 while escorting a convoy through the Straits by Tarifa, he succeeding in decoying an enemy flotilla within range of his guns before forcing them to seek safety under their land batteries.

On 20 April 1807 he engaged a division of gun-boats and several batteries near Cabrita Point; and from then until 19 August he was constantly engaged with the enemy. On 7 September, returning from conveying despatches to the Balearic Islands, Redwing drove several vessels ashore near the town of Calassel, on the coast of Catalonia, and would have taken or destroyed them, had not a violent thunderstorm prevented it. The following day, having approached within 100 yards of the castle of Benidorm, mounting four 18-pounders, her boats under Lt. John Macpherson Ferguson, boarded and captured a polacre. Despite damage to her masts, sails, and rigging Redwing made after three privateers, which under cover of the smoke had made their escape from the town. These she pursued until they ran on shore at Joyosa, four miles west of Benidorm.

At daybreak on 7 May 1808, about six miles east-south-east of Cape Trafalgar, he discovered a convoy of twelve merchant ships under the protection of seven armed vessels: two schooners, the Diligente and Boreas, each armed with two long 24-pounders and two 8-pounders, with a complement of 60 men; three gun-vessels, carrying between them three long 24-pounders, two 6-pounders, one 36-pounder, and 111 men; and a mistico and felucca, each of 4 guns and 20 men. Forming a line abreast the ships approached Redwing with the intention of boarding her. Ussher prepared his ship by loading each gun with grape, canister, and a bag of 500 musket-balls on top of round shot. As the enemy approached within pistol-shot Redwing's fired her broadside to devastating effect. The Diligente gave two or three heavy rolls, then turned over and sank. The Boreas was also sunk, and two other vessels, with four of the merchantmen, disappeared in the surf; and seven traders, together with the armed mistico, fell into the hands of the British. The felucca, one gun-boat, and a single merchant-vessel were all that escaped. Redwing had her foremast crippled by two 24-pounder shot, another passed through her mainmast, and the gammoning of her bowsprit was shot through. Her losses were confined to one man killed, and three wounded.

On 1 June 1808, Redwing pursued a mistico and two feluccas into the Bay of Bolonia, near Cape Trafalgar. She silenced a battery of six long 24-pounders, before her boats under Lieutenant Ferguson destroyed the mistico and took possession of the feluccas. Accompanied by the Lieutenant and 40 men, Ussher then landed, stormed the battery, rendered its guns unserviceable, and destroyed the magazine. Up to this period the Redwing had lost 7 men killed and 32 wounded.

On his return to Gibraltar, Ussher found that he had been promoted to post-captain, with seniority dating from 24 May 1808. However his health again broke down and he returned to England to recuperate in the sloop Bittern, arriving there in September 1808. At a public dinner given to him by the nobility and gentry Ussher was presented with the Freedom of the City of Dublin.

=== Walcheren ===
On 6 May 1809, Ussher was appointed to command of the Leyden (64), which was intended to be stationed in the Kattegat for the protection of British trade. For that purpose she had 13 gun-boats with 18 lieutenants and 800 men attached to her. However the abdication of King Gustav IV Adolf of Sweden, altered the plans of Government, and she was not employed in any particular way until the commencement of the Walcheren Campaign in July 1809. She sailed to the Netherlands with a regiment of Guards, returning to England with a contingent of sick soldiers. On being ordered back to the Scheldt, the ship was found so defective that the pilots refused to take charge of her. Ussher was obliged to navigate her himself.

Leyden was paid off in January 1810, and on 15 May 1811 Ussher was given temporary command of the America (74), transferring to the ship-sloop Hyacinth (26) on 24 May to accompany a fleet of merchantmen to the Mediterranean, where he joined the squadron engaged in the defence of Cádiz.

=== The Mediterranean again ===
On the night of 29 April 1812, having assembled the boats of Hyacinth, the sloop Goshawk, the gun-brig Resolute, and Gun-boat No.16, he attacked several privateers, commanded by "Barbastro", lying in the port of Málaga. Ussher led the attack by capturing two 24-pounder batteries guarding the entrance to the port, supported by his Second Lieutenant, Thomas Hastings, then turning the guns of the batteries on the castle of Gibralfaro, while his boats boarded the boats in the harbour. The ship's boats and their prizes were exposed to heavy fire from the castle as well as from troops of the French 57th Regiment of infantry on the mole-wall. The privateers Braave of 10 guns and 130 men (most of whom jumped overboard), and Napoleon, of similar force, were captured — the remainder, before they were abandoned, being damaged as much as possible. The British, out of 149 officers and men, had 15, including Captain James Lilburne of the Goshawk, killed, and 53 wounded. Although not completely successful, the operation was praised by Sir Edward Pellew, the Commander-in-Chief, and the Board of Admiralty.

On 26 May 1812, in co-operation with Spanish guerrilleros, Ussher, with Hyacinth, the sloop Termagant, and the gun-brig Basilisk, attacked the castle of Almuñécar, which was armed with two brass 24-pounders, six iron 18-pounders, and a howitzer, and defended by 300 French troops. In less than an hour fire from the castle was silenced. However, by 7 a.m. the next morning the French re-opened fire, having brought up a howitzer, but by 10 a.m. the castle was again silenced, and the French were driven into the town, taking up positions in the church and houses. At 2 p.m., after having destroyed a privateer of two guns and 30 or 40 men, Ussher ran down to Nerja, to confer with his allies. There he embarked 200 Spanish infantry, and set sail for Almuñécar, while a body of cavalry headed there overland. While Ussher was delayed by a calm, the French learned of the approaching attack and abandoned the town.

=== Blockade of Toulon ===
On 1 October 1812 Ussher was appointed to the 36-gun frigate Euryalus, having also held temporary command of the 74 Edinburgh for a few days at Menorca. Ussher intercepted several valuable American merchantmen during the short time he commanded Euryalus, but was employed chiefly at the blockade of Toulon.

On 2 February 1813 he was transferred to command of the 38-gun Undaunted, and was engaged in a variety of operations on the southern coast of France. On 18 March 1813 Undaunted chased a tartan under the battery of Carry-le-Rouet, about five leagues west of Marseille. Boats under the command of Lieutenant Aaron Tozer landed, and within a few minutes captured a battery mounting four 24-pounders, a 6-pounder field-gun, and a 13-inch mortar. The battery was destroyed and the tartan brought out, with a loss of two men killed and one wounded.

On 18 August 1813 an attack was made upon Cassis, between Marseille and Toulon, by Undaunted, the brig Redwing, and the 16-gun brig-sloop Kite, reinforced by boats from the ships Caledonia, Hibernia, Barfleur and Prince of Wales. Light winds meant that Undaunted could not take up her intended position, but Redwing and Kite, in spite of fire from four batteries that protected the entrance of the bay, swept in, and took up positions to cover the marines as they captured the citadel by escalade, and drove the French out. The boats then entered the harbour, and captured three gun-boats and 24 merchant settees and tartans. Losses sustained by the British were four marines killed and 16 men wounded. In late 1813 Ussher was stationed by Sir Edward Pellew off Toulon with a small squadron under his orders to watch the movements of the French fleet.

In April 1814 while off Marseille, and in company with Euryalus, Captain Charles Napier, Ussher received a deputation, consisting of the mayor and civil authorities of the city, who informed him of the abdication of Bonaparte, and of the formation of a provisional government. He landed and there received orders from Lord Castlereagh in Paris, to prepare to convey Bonaparte to Elba. He embarked Bonaparte and his retinue on the evening of 28 April at Fréjus, arriving at Portoferraio on the evening of the 30th. On 3 May Bonaparte landed, and Ussher remained at Elba until the English transports which had brought Bonaparte's troops, horses, carriages, and baggage were cleared and sent to Genoa. Though requested by Bonaparte to prolong his stay, he also left. Ussher was then given command of the 74 Duncan on 29 June 1814, returning to England in her in August.

=== Post-war career ===
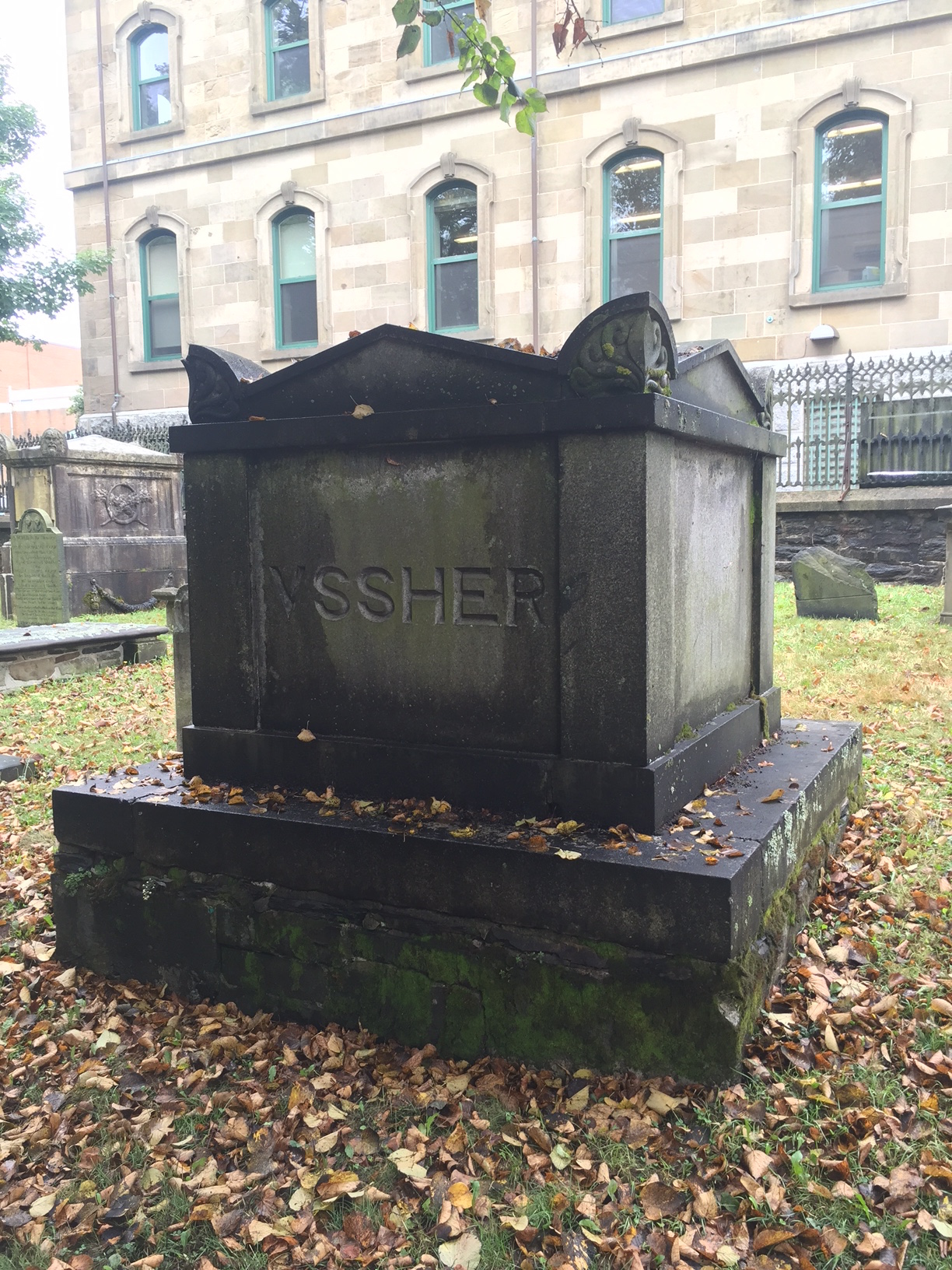
Tomb of Sir Thomas Ussher's wife, Eliza Ussher, d. 1835, Old Burying Ground (Halifax, Nova Scotia)

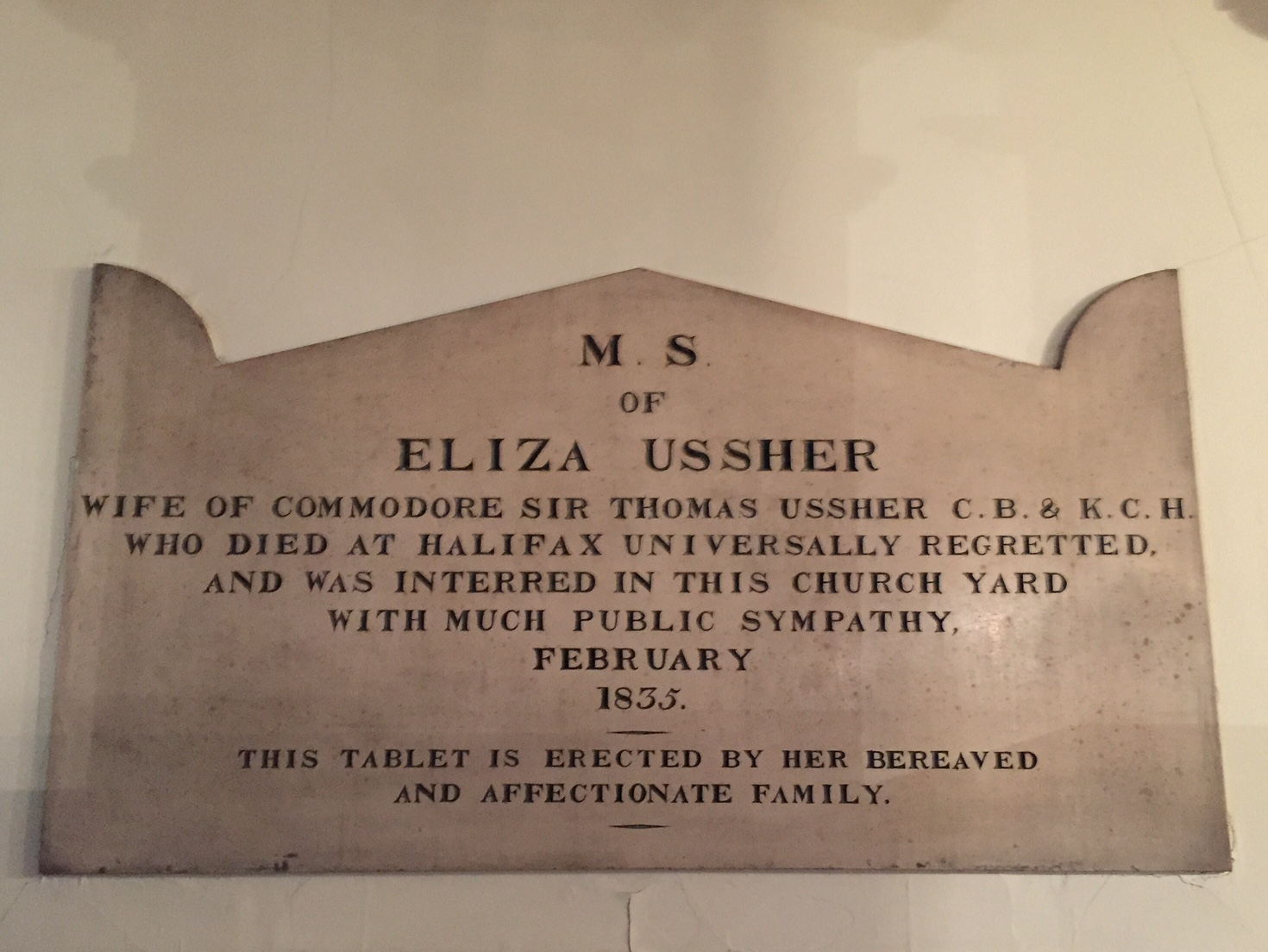
Eliza Ussher Plaque, St. Paul's Church (Halifax), Nova Scotia, Canada

In recognition of his services he was made a Companion of the Bath on 4 June 1815, and on 2 December was awarded a pension for his wounds of £250 per annum. On 24 July 1830 he was appointed equerry in the Household of Her Majesty Queen Adelaide, and was in 1831 created a Knight Commander of the Royal Guelphic Order and a knight bachelor. He served as Superintendent of the Royal Navy Dockyards at Bermuda and Halifax between 1831 and 1838, and was granted the Captain's Good-Service Pension on 12 March 1838. He published his Narrative of the First Abdication of Napoleon in 1840 and on 9 November 1846 was promoted to flag-rank as Rear-Admiral of the Blue. He served as Commander-in-Chief at Cork Station, from 1 July 1847 until his death the following year.

== Personal life ==
On 28 December 1802 at St Marylebone Parish Church, London, Ussher married Elizabeth Deborah Foster, the daughter of Thomas Foster of Grove House, Buckinghamshire, the niece of Frederick William Foster, Bishop of the Moravian Church at Jamaica, and a cousin of the third Lady Holland. They had four sons and three daughters:

- Thomas Neville Ussher, Chargé d'affaires and Consul-General to Haiti
  - Thomas was father to Herbert Taylor Ussher
- Major Edward Pellew Hammett Ussher, Royal Marines
- Captain Sydney Henry Ussher, Royal Navy
- William Henry Bernard Ussher, Army Commissariat
- Caroline Ussher
- Elizabeth Ussher
- Frances Ussher

In his will Ussher left his two surviving daughters, Caroline and Elizabeth, all his property, which included a snuff box presented to him by Napoleon, containing a miniature of the Emperor by Isabey, surrounded by diamonds, for which King George IV once offered him £3,000.

Military offices
Preceded by Hugh Pigot	Commander-in-Chief, Cork Station; 1847–1848	Succeeded by Donald Mackay
