= Nymphe-class frigate =

1781 class of French frigates

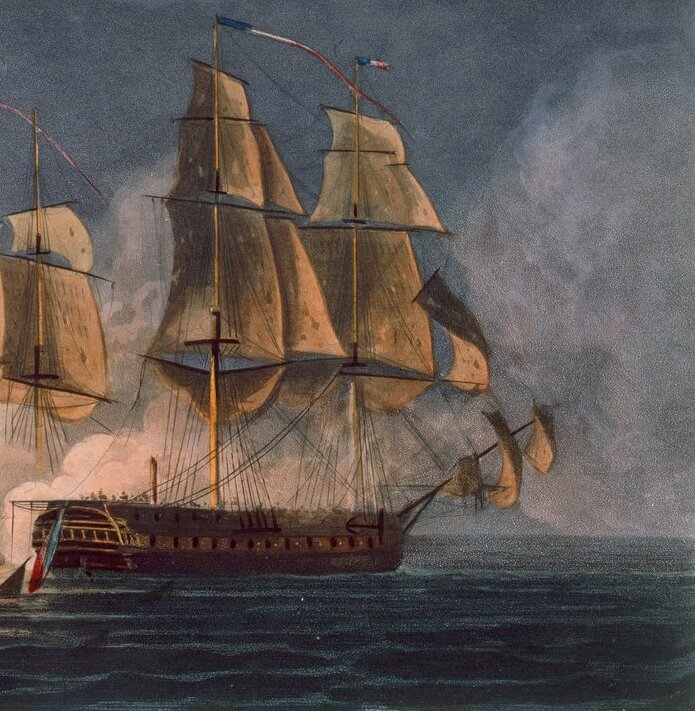
- Thétis at the action of 10 November 1808

Class overview
- Name: Nymphe class
- Builders: Brest, France
- Operators: French Navy; Royal Navy
- Preceded by: Danaé class
- Succeeded by: Minerve class
- Planned: 4
- Completed: 4

General characteristics
- Type: Frigate
- Displacement: 1100 tonneaux
- Tons burthen: 600 port tonneaux
- Length: 46.9 m (153 ft 10 in)
- Beam: 11.9 m (39 ft 1 in)
- Draught: 5.8 m (19 ft 0 in)
- Sail plan: Ship-rigged
- Complement: 297
- Armament: 26 × long 18-pounder guns (later increased to 28); 12 × long 8-pounder guns; 4 × 36-pounder obusiers

The Nymphe class was a class of four 34/44-gun frigates of the French Navy, designed in 1781 by Pierre-Augustin Lamothe. The prototype (Nymphe) was one of the earliest of the frigates to be armed with 18-pounder long guns. The first two - Nymphe and Thétis - carried 34 guns comprising twenty-six 18-pounders on the upper deck and eight 8-pounders on the quarterdeck and forecastle. The latter two - Cybèle and Concorde - carried an increased armament of 44 guns comprising twenty-eight 18-pounders on the upper deck and twelve 8-pounders plus four 36-pounder obuses on the quarterdeck and forecastle. Thétis was retro-fitted by 1794 to carry the same increased armament as the last two; she was rebuilt at Rochefort from October 1802 to September 1803.

The design followed on at Brest from an earlier class of three smaller frigates (armed with 12-pounder long guns) - named Nymphe (1777), Andromaque (1778) and Astrée (1780) - built at Brest to a different design by Lamothe's father.

== Ships in earlier (12-pounder armed) class ==
These three ships were named on 11 April 1777, 29 September 1777 and 4 December 1778 respectively.

- Nymphe (12-pounder armed frigate)

Builder: Brest
Begun: April 1777
Launched: 18 August 1777
Completed: November 1777
Fate: captured by British Royal Navy in 1780 and became HMS Nymphe.

- Andromaque

Builder: Brest
Begun: August 1777
Launched: 24 December 1777
Completed: April 1778
Fate: Scuttled by fire on 22 August 1796

- Astrée

Builder: Brest
Begun: August 1779
Launched: 16 May 1780
Completed: July 1780
Fate: Wrecked in the Atlantic in May 1795

== Ships in (18-pounder armed) class ==
- Nymphe (18-pounder armed frigate)

Builder: Brest
Begun: December 1781
Launched: 30 May 1782
Completed: August 1782
Fate: Wrecked at Noirmoutier on 30 December 1793.

- Thétis

Builder: Brest
Ordered: 4 November 1786
Begun: September 1787
Launched: 16 June 1788
Completed: October 1788
Fate: Captured by the British Navy on 10 November 1808 off Lorient. The British took her into service as HMS Brune.

- Cybèle

Builder: Brest
Begun: June 1788
Launched: 7 July 1789
Completed: May 1790
Fate: Wrecked in action 24 February 1809 off Sables d'Olonne.

- Concorde

Builder: Brest
Begun: April 1790
Launched: 25 October 1791
Completed: February 1793
Fate: Captured by the British Navy off Brazil on 4 August 1800.

== See also ==
- List of sail frigates of France
