= Action of 10 November 1808 =

1808 naval battle of the Napoleonic Wars

Coordinates: 45.139°N 1.496°W

- Part of the Napoleonic Wars
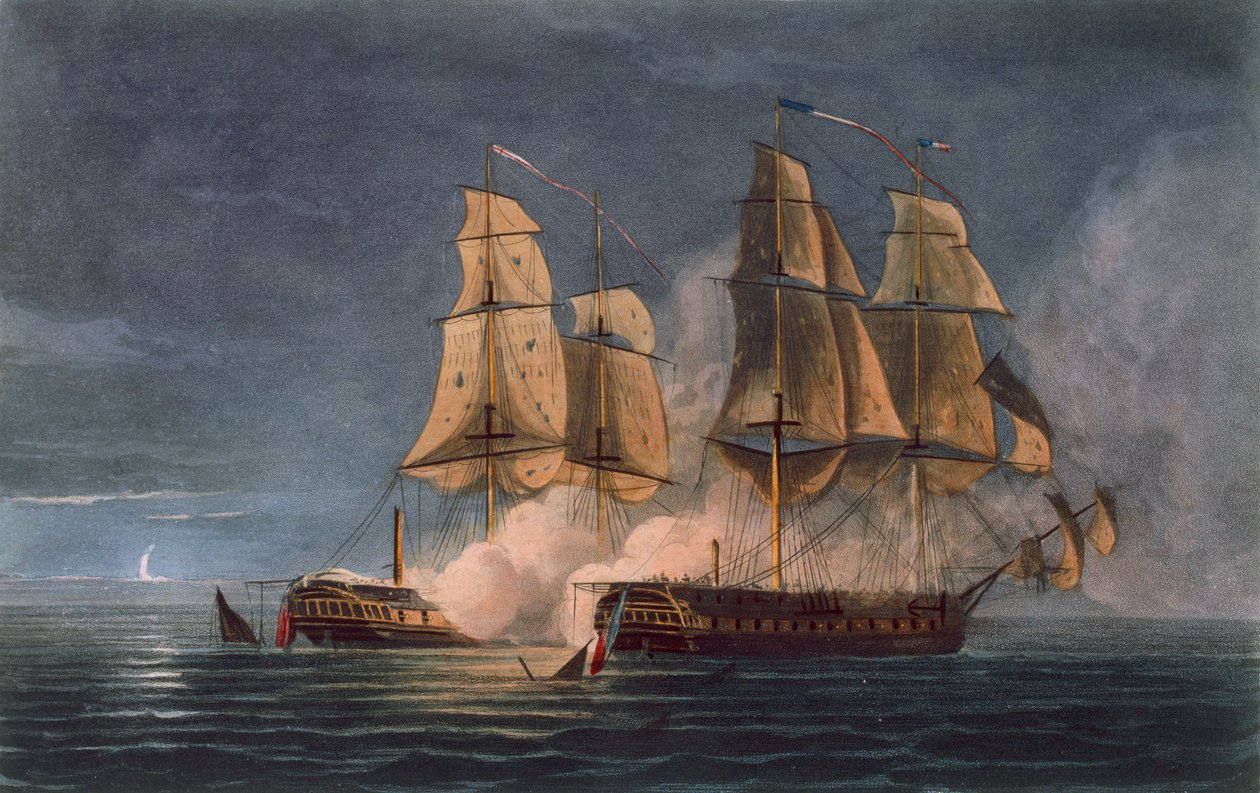
- Capture of la Thetis by Amethyst, Novr 10th 1808, Thomas Whitcombe
Date	10 November 1808
Location	Bay of Biscay
Result	British victory

Belligerents
United Kingdom	France

Commanders and leaders
Michael Seymour	Jacques Pinsum †

Strength
frigate HMS Amethyst, with HMS Triumph and HMS Shannon in support	frigate Thétis

Casualties and losses
19 killed, 51 wounded	135 killed, 102 wounded, Thétis captured

The action of 10 November 1808 was a minor naval engagement of the Napoleonic Wars, in which a British frigate defeated and captured a French frigate in the Bay of Biscay. The action formed part of the blockade of the French Biscay ports during the war by the British Royal Navy, a strategy designed to prevent ships from entering or leaving French harbours, thus eliminating foreign trade with France and damaging the French economy as well as cutting France off from her overseas colonies. The French ship in the action, Thétis, was destined for the French held West Indian island of Martinique with a cargo of flour and military supplies, including over 100 soldiers to reinforce the island's garrison.

Thétis had not even cleared the French coast when she was discovered by a patrolling British frigate of the inshore squadron, a unit tasked with watching the entrance to the French Biscay ports, principally Brest, and intercepting any ships seeking to enter or leave the harbours. This frigate, HMS Amethyst chased Thétis and brought her to battle, closing with the French ship but preventing the soldiers aboard Thétis from boarding the British ship and using their superior numbers to overwhelm her with heavy and accurate gunfire. The battle lasted more than six hours and the French suffered over 130 men killed, including the captain and many of the soldiers aboard, before the crew of Amethyst was able to storm and capture Thétis. Within minutes two additional British vessels arrived, attracted by the sound of gunfire, and helped secure the badly damaged Thétis for the journey to Britain.

The battle was a blow for the French defenders of Martinique, who were isolated from France and suffering from shortages of military and food supplies. Although another supply frigate broke through the blockade and arrived in December 1808, the island was surrounded by British bases and was invaded and captured in January 1809. Other French colonies were seized over the next two years as the blockade cut off French communications with their overseas territories. Amethyst and her captain Michael Seymour were active in this campaign, capturing a second French frigate, Niémen, at the action of 6 April 1809.

== Background ==
By November 1808, the Napoleonic Wars had lasted five years. Although the French had conquered large swathes of mainland Europe, they were unable to exert any significant influence at sea, where the British Royal Navy had been dominant since the Battle of Trafalgar in October 1805. A vital part of Royal Navy strategy was the implementation of a close blockade of the major French seaports by squadrons of frigates and ships of the line, intended to intercept and capture any ships attempting to enter or leave French harbours. The greatest French Atlantic seaport, and consequently the most important target for the Royal Navy, was Brest, situated on the Northern Biscay coast. Watching Brest were a large number of warships, divided into the inshore squadron designed to watch the coast directly and formed principally of frigates and small fast vessels, and the offshore squadron formed from heavy ships of the line and tasked with intercepting French fleets and battle squadrons spotted by the inshore squadron.

The efficiency of the British blockade was such that communication and reinforcement between France and her colonies was dangerous for the ships involved and so was severely limited. This led to shortages and disaffection among the French colonists, especially in the Caribbean, where they were surrounded by hostile British harbours and constantly raided and blockaded by British ships. The island of Martinique was one of the more important French islands in the West Indies, but by late 1808 the island's economy had been crippled by the British blockade, and food stocks, military supplies and morale were all running low. In the summer a French dispatch vessel was intercepted by British warships, warning of the desperate state of the island's defences; similar messages that did reach France safely prompted an urgent response by the French Navy.

The frigate Thétis, stationed to the south of Brest at Lorient, was selected to carry supplies to Martinique and given a full complement of 330 men, 40 cannon and a new captain, Jacques Pinsum. Supplies were loaded, including over 1,000 barrels of flour and 106 soldiers to reinforce the garrison at Martinique. Secrecy was tight: to prevent the British discovering Thétis' mission, even the local shore defences were not informed of the frigate's departure early on 10 November 1808.

The French efforts to hide the frigate's mission and departure were initially successful: the British ships in the area were unaware of Thétis's intentions before she sailed. They were however prepared for any French movement and were launching regular patrols, in particular two ships under the command of captains Michael Seymour and Frederick Lewis Maitland, HMS Amethyst and HMS Emerald respectively. Both captains were experienced and veteran officers: Seymour had lost an arm at the Glorious First of June 15 years earlier, and they had agreed to hunt together, communicating regularly and with an understanding that all prize money won would be shared equally across both crews. After several weeks sailing in tandem, the frigates separated in early November.

== Battle ==
At 18:42 on 10 November 1808, the garrison of a French defensive gun battery on the island of Groix saw a frigate moving rapidly westwards. As they had not been informed of any French movements at that time, the battery fired two warning shots at the ship to establish her identity. The frigate, Thétis, replied with her recognition signal and the firing stopped, but the sound had attracted the attention of HMS Amethyst, then approaching Groix from the west. Within a few minutes, Seymour's lookouts had spotted the French frigate and Amethyst immediately gave chase. Pinsum followed his orders to avoid combat and made all sail south-west, intending to escape into the Atlantic. By 21:00, Amethyst was close enough to fire her bow-chasers, small guns positioned at the front of the ship, at the French frigate and was attacked in turn from the French stern chasers. Certain that his quarry was an enemy, Seymour launched signal rockets in the hope of attracting attention from other ships of the inshore squadron that might intercept the French ship, and he received answering flashes from the north-east as Captain Sir Thomas Hardy joined the chase in HMS Triumph.

By 21:15, Pinsum realised that his heavily laden ship could not outrun Amethyst and reduced his speed, turning sharply in front of the British ship in an attempt to rake her. Seymour was prepared for the manoeuvre and countered it by turning sharply away from Thétis so that the French broadside fell harmlessly into the sea and both frigates performed a complete circle before returning to their previous course. Seymour then swung back towards the French ship, bringing Amethyst alongside and pouring a heavy fire into Thétis, which replied in kind. For 25 minutes, the frigates continued firing on one another from close range as they sailed westwards. At 21:40, Pinsum again attempted to rake Amethyst, trying to cross the British ship's stern as she pulled ahead. Seymour countered by slowing his ship and the French rigging became tangled in the British, the firing continuing as the crews worked to free their ships from one another. Separating a few minutes later, the frigates continued their close-range duel. Amethyst again pulled ahead at 22:05, Seymour successfully crossing the bow of the French ship from port and raking her before swinging back along the starboard side to resume the close range exchange of broadsides.

French fire was taking its toll on the British ship, and at 22:20, Amethyst's mizzenmast was shot through and collapsed on the quarterdeck, smashing the wheel and impeding Seymour's command of his ship. Thétis began to pull ahead and Pinsum attempted to rake Amethyst in her disorganised state, turning sharply to starboard but coming to a sudden halt as her own mizzenmast collapsed. With their ability to manoeuvre severely hindered, Amethyst and Thétis gradually closed on one another, Pinsum ordering the soldiers on his frigate to board the British vessel and capture her, while Seymour prepared for the eventuality by loading his cannon with two roundshot and his carronades with double loads of grapeshot. At 23:00, Pinsum suddenly swung his frigate towards Amethyst, the bows colliding and rebounding and the French stern swinging towards the British. At his signal, the soldiers and sailors crowded onto the deck and railings, ready to leap onto the British ship and engage her crew in hand-to-hand combat. With seconds remaining, Seymour ordered his gunners to fire. The double-shotted broadside, fired at point-blank range, killed or wounded over 100 men, including most of the officers. Only four guns were still serviceable on Thétis, which was set alight in three places due to the proximity of the British muzzle flashes.

== Aftermath ==
Amethyst continued firing on Thétis for the next 80 minutes, almost without reply, until 12:20, when the British were able to board and seize Thétis unopposed, the two frigates tangled together by their rigging. Seymour's most immediate problem was to secure his prize. Many of the unwounded prisoners were transferred to Amethyst under guard and at 01:05, the frigates were cut apart by severing the tangled rigging. Ten minutes later, the 74-gun HMS Triumph appeared out of the darkness and at 01:30 a second frigate, HMS Shannon under Captain Philip Broke, arrived, drawn by the gunfire. Together, the three British ships removed the prisoners from Thétis and effected improvised repairs: Thétis had lost her remaining masts shortly after she had been boarded and Amethyst's were in immediate danger of collapse. British casualties in the engagement were severe, with 19 killed and 51 wounded, but French losses were several times larger, with 135 dead, including Pinsum, and 102 wounded.

In Britain, Seymour's victory was rewarded: Seymour himself was presented with a commemorative medal, £100 (with £625 to share among the wounded) and the freedoms of Cork and Limerick, although there were suggestions that he should receive a knighthood. In addition, first lieutenant Goddard Blennerhasset was promoted to commander, the junior officers were advanced and Thétis was purchased by the Royal Navy as HMS Brune, the crews of Emerald and Amethyst profiting from the prize money. Four decades later the battle was among the actions recognised by a clasp attached to the Naval General Service Medal, awarded upon application to all British participants still living in 1847. Amethyst had been severely damaged in the engagement and repairs took 71 days to complete at Plymouth. Five months later, Seymour and Maitland were specially selected to hunt the Niémen, en route to Île de France, in the Bay of Biscay. Again, Emerald was absent when the frigate was brought to action and again Seymour was able to capture his opponent after a fierce encounter in the action of 6 April 1809. Although Seymour praised the bravery of Thétis' surviving French officer, Lieutenant Joseph Dedé, Dedé later swore in court that Thétis had not surrendered until after Triumph and Shannon arrived, a statement that contradicts not only British testimony, but also Dedé's own insistence on the night of the battle that he had not seen any other ships during the action. Historian William James suggests that this was a deliberate attempt to appeal to the French naval authorities to avoid responsibility for the defeat.

The failure of the supplies and reinforcements carried on Thétis to reach the Caribbean may have had an effect on the outcome of the subsequent invasion of Martinique in January 1809. Except for one reinforcement frigate, Amphitrite, none of the subsequent French efforts to transport supplies or soldiers to Martinique were successful, and a large British expeditionary force was able to overwhelm the island's poorly-supplied defenders in a brief campaign. The tightening blockade also affected other French colonies, preventing the despatch of food and military supplies and contributing to the captures of both Île de France and Guadeloupe in 1810.
