= HMS Hyacinth (1806) =

Sloop of the Royal Navy

- Hyacinth

History

United Kingdom
- Name: HMS Hyacinth
- Ordered: 12 July 1805
- Builder: John Preston, Great Yarmouth
- Laid down: November 1805
- Launched: 30 August 1806
- Completed: 21 November 1806 at Chatham Dockyard
- Commissioned: October 1806
- Out of service: Broken up December 1820
- Honours and awards: Naval General Service Medal with the clasp "Malaga 29 May 1812"

General characteristics
- Class & type: 18-gun Cormorant-class sloop
- Tons burthen: 42423/94 (bm)
- Length: 108 ft 9 in (33.1 m) (overall); 91 ft 1.875 in (27.8 m) (keel)
- Beam: 29 ft 7 in (9.0 m)
- Depth of hold: 9 ft (2.74 m)
- Propulsion: Sails
- Sail plan: Sloop
- Complement: 121
- Armament: Upper deck: 16 × 32-pounder carronades; QD: 6 × 18-pounder carronades; Fc: 2 × 6-pounder guns + 2 × 18-pounder carronades

HMS Hyacinth was an 18-gun ship-sloop of the Cormorant class in the Royal Navy, launched in 1806 at Great Yarmouth. In 1810 she was reclassed as a 20-gun Post-ship (but without being re-armed). She was again re-rated as 24 guns in 1817. Hyacinth took part in some notable actions on the coast of Spain, one of which earned qualified in 1817 for the Naval General Service Medal. She was broken up in 1820.

== Service ==
Hyacinth was commissioned in October 1806 under Commander John Davie.

On 21 April 1807 Hyacinth captured the Frau Justina. Then on 15 August 1807 Hyacinth, under Commander John Davie, captured the Zeenymph. That same day Hyacinth was in company with Forrester and Flora when Flora captured the fishing vessels Hoop, Nepthun and Hoffnung. Nine days later Hyacinth and Vestal were in company with Flora when Flora captured the St. Sylvester.

Hyacinth then sailed for South America on 15 February 1808. In August 1809, Commander John Carter took command while Hyacinth was still in South America. She returned to Britain and spent the period May through July 1811 in Portsmouth undergoing maintenance. At some point in 1812 the Admiralty re-rated Hyacinth as a post ship, and Captain Thomas Ussher took command of her.

=== Attack on the Brave and the Napoleon ===
In the spring of 1812 Hyacinth received the task of stopping several fast vessels that were operating as privateers from Malaga, all under the command of "Barbastro". Unfortunately, Hyacinth was not fast enough to catch the privateers and although Usher disguised her as a merchantman, this ruse too failed. Usher then assembled a small squadron consisting of Goshawk, Resolute and Gunboat No. 16 to attack the privateers in their base.

On the evening of 29 April, Usher sent in his squadron's boats carrying a cutting out party. Hyacinth's gig and pinnace with Usher, Lieutenant Thomas Hastings and 26 men, attacked a battery of fifteen 24-pounder guns. Her barge, with Lieutenant Francis Spilsbury and John Elgar, purser, and 24 men attacked a second battery of four 24-pounder guns opposite the first. Commander Lilburne of Goshawk, with 40 men in Lieutenant Cull's gunboat, attacked the chief privateer ship Brave (or Braave, alias Sebastiani). The remaining boats, under Lieutenant Keenan, attacked the other privateers.

Usher and his party went in ahead and took possession of their target battery in less than five minutes. He fired a rocket that was the signal for the gunboat and the other boats to come in. Midshipman Pierce and 12 men then boarded and captured the Brave despite facing 33 crew men who had remained aboard after Barbastro and the bulk of his crew had jumped overboard. Lilburne followed the plan by attacking the remaining privateer vessels. To assist the attack, Usher turned the guns in the battery that he had captured around and fired on the castle of Gibralfaro; the British kept up the cannonade until they had exhausted the available ammunition.

When the British sought to withdraw, soldiers from the French 57th. regiment lined the mole, firing their muskets as the prize crews brought out their prizes. The castle too fired at the withdrawing British with its cannons. Then the wind died away, which slowed the withdrawal; it was at this time that Lilburne was mortally wounded. The French fire forced the British to leave behind most of the vessels they had captured. Before they did so, they damaged them as much as they could.

The British were able to bring out Brave and Napoleon (alias Diaboloten), both of 10 guns. (Note: Winfield gives the names of these two vessels as Intrepido and Napoleone) The boarding party also retrieved an eagle that Napoleon had presented to Barbastro and that he had left on Brave. The attack had a heavy cost for the British. The gunboat sank during her return passage to Gibraltar and in all, the British lost 15 men killed and 53 wounded. In 1847 the Admiralty authorized the issue of the Naval General Service Medal with the clasp "Malaga 29 May 1812" for this action. (Note: The shift by a month in the date of the action appears to be an error.)

=== Other action on the coast of Granada ===
In May 1812, Hyacinth and Termagant and Basilisk supported Spanish guerrillas on the coast of Granada, against the French. On 24 May with Hyacinth and Termagant, Basilisk took a French privateer of two guns, and a brass cannon. Prize money for the "capture of a brass gun and the destruction of a French privateer, name unknown" was payable in March 1836. (Note: A first-class share was worth £23 18s 6d; a sixth-class share, that of an ordinary seaman, was worth 5s 7½d.)

Hyacinth destroyed the castle at Nerja on 25 May. The British squadron then supported a guerrilla offensive against Almunecar. The British destroyed a privateer of two guns and 40 men under the castle. They the fired on the castle, creating breaches in its walls. The French then retreated to Grenada after having spiked the castle's guns, which consisted of two brass 24-pounders, six iron 18-pounders, a 6-pounder, and a howitzer. The French also left behind a number of deserters, Flemish and German draftees, who had long looked for an opportunity to quit their involuntary service.

In June 1812 Captain William Hamilton was appointed to command Hyacinth. When the War of 1812 broke out, the British captured several American ships in the Mediterranean. Hyacinth shared with San Juan, Sabine, Lavinia, Hindostan and Tuscan in the American droits for Phoenix, Margaret, Allegany and Tyger, captured on 8 August 1812 at Gibraltar after the arrival of the news of the outbreak of the War of 1812. (Note: In May 1816 there was distribution to the sharing vessels of their portions of two-thirds of the first three American vessels and nine-tenths of Tyger. A first-class share was worth £120 16s 0½d; a sixth-class share was worth £1 19s 9¼d.)

Ten days later, Hyacinth and Blossom were in sight when the letter of marque Sir Alexander Ball captured the American ship Grace Ann Green. Nine days after that, Hyacinth and Argo captured the Eliza.

Hamilton's temporary successor in November was Captain John Lampen Manley. In January 1813 Alexander Sharpe replaced Manley.

== Fate ==
Hyacinth remained in the Mediterranean until 1815. Later, in 1817, she sailed to Brazil. Hyacinth was broken up in December 1820.
