= French frigate Nymphe (1782) =

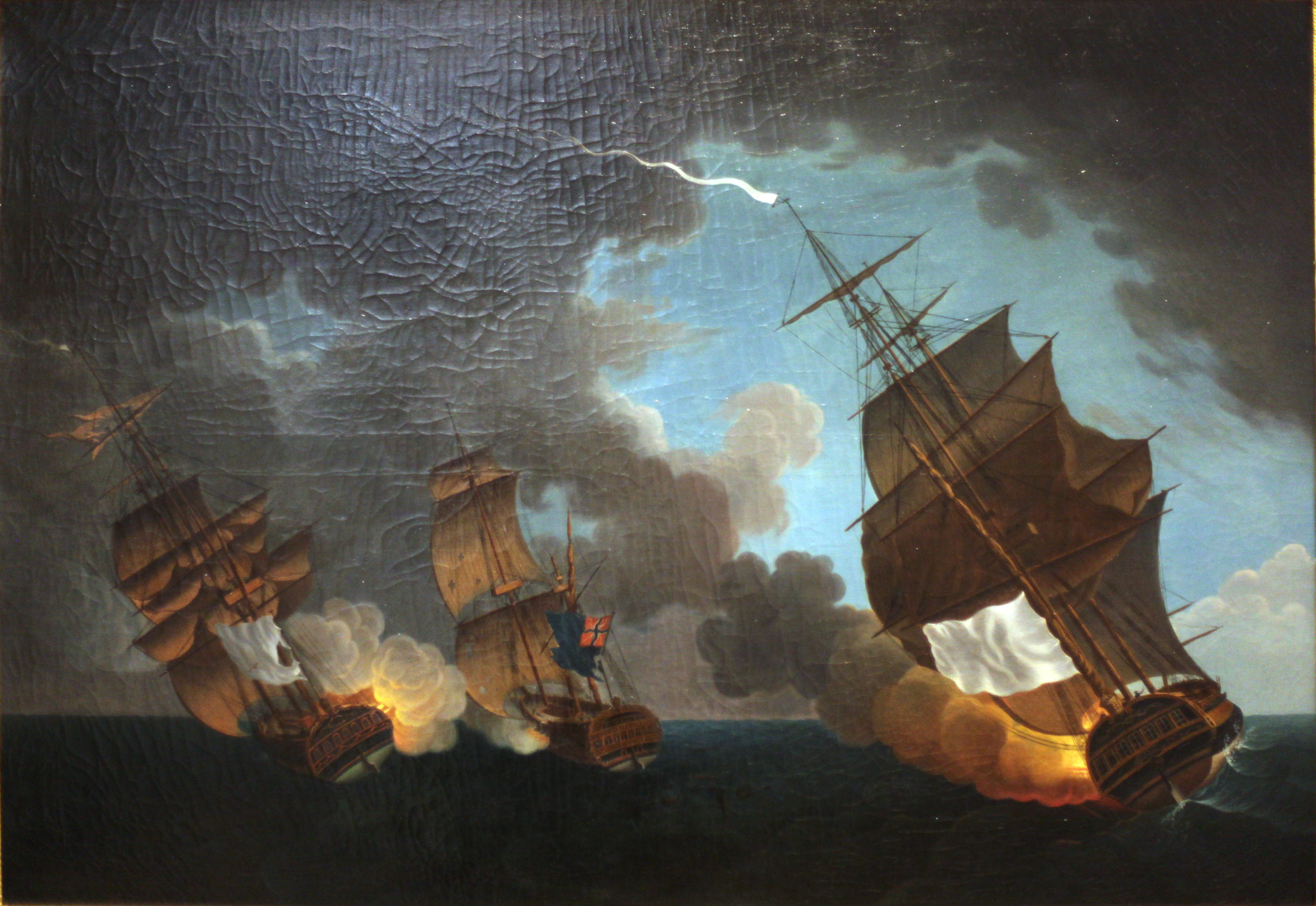
- Battle between the French frigates Nymphe, Amphitrite, and the 44-gun two-decker HMS Argo, 17 February 1783, by Auguste-Louis de Rossel de Cercy.

History

France
- Name: Nymphe
- Namesake: Nymph
- Ordered: 5 December 1781
- Builder: Brest
- Laid down: December 1781
- Launched: 30 May 1782
- In service: August 1782
- Fate: Wrecked at Noirmoutier

General characteristics
- Class & type: Nymphe-class frigate
- Displacement: 1423 tonneaux
- Tons burthen: 744 port tonneaux
- Length: 46.9 m (153 ft 10 in)
- Beam: 11.9 m (39 ft 1 in)
- Height: 5.8 m (19 ft 0 in)
- Sail plan: Full-rigged ship

Nymphe was a 40-gun Nymphe-class frigate of the French Navy.

== Career ==
In January 1783, Nymphe was in the Caribbean, with Concorde. On 7, they captured the corvette HMS Raven. On 17 February of the same year, Nymphe was with the 32-gun Amphitrite when she captured the 44-gun HMS Argo.

On 20 January 1785, Nymphe arrived at Brest, ferrying Lafayette.

In July 1792, she was under Coëtnempren de Kerdournan. Along with Dromadaire and Curieux, she sailed to Cayenne to ferry troops, as well as the new governor, Frédéric Joseph Guillot. She then returned to Lorient and was put in the ordinary.

In July 1793, Nymphe was brought into active again under Lieutenant Pitot to fight the Chouan royalist insurgency.

== Fate ==
On 30 December 1793, Nymphe was wrecked while battling Chouan coastal artillery near Noirmoutier.

== Bibliography ==
- Roche, Jean-Michel (2005). Dictionnaire des bâtiments de la flotte de guerre française de Colbert à nos jours. Vol. 1. Group Retozel-Maury Millau. ISBN 978-2-9525917-0-6. OCLC 165892922.
