= Sir Michael Seymour, 1st Baronet =

Rear-Admiral Sir Michael Seymour Bt KCB
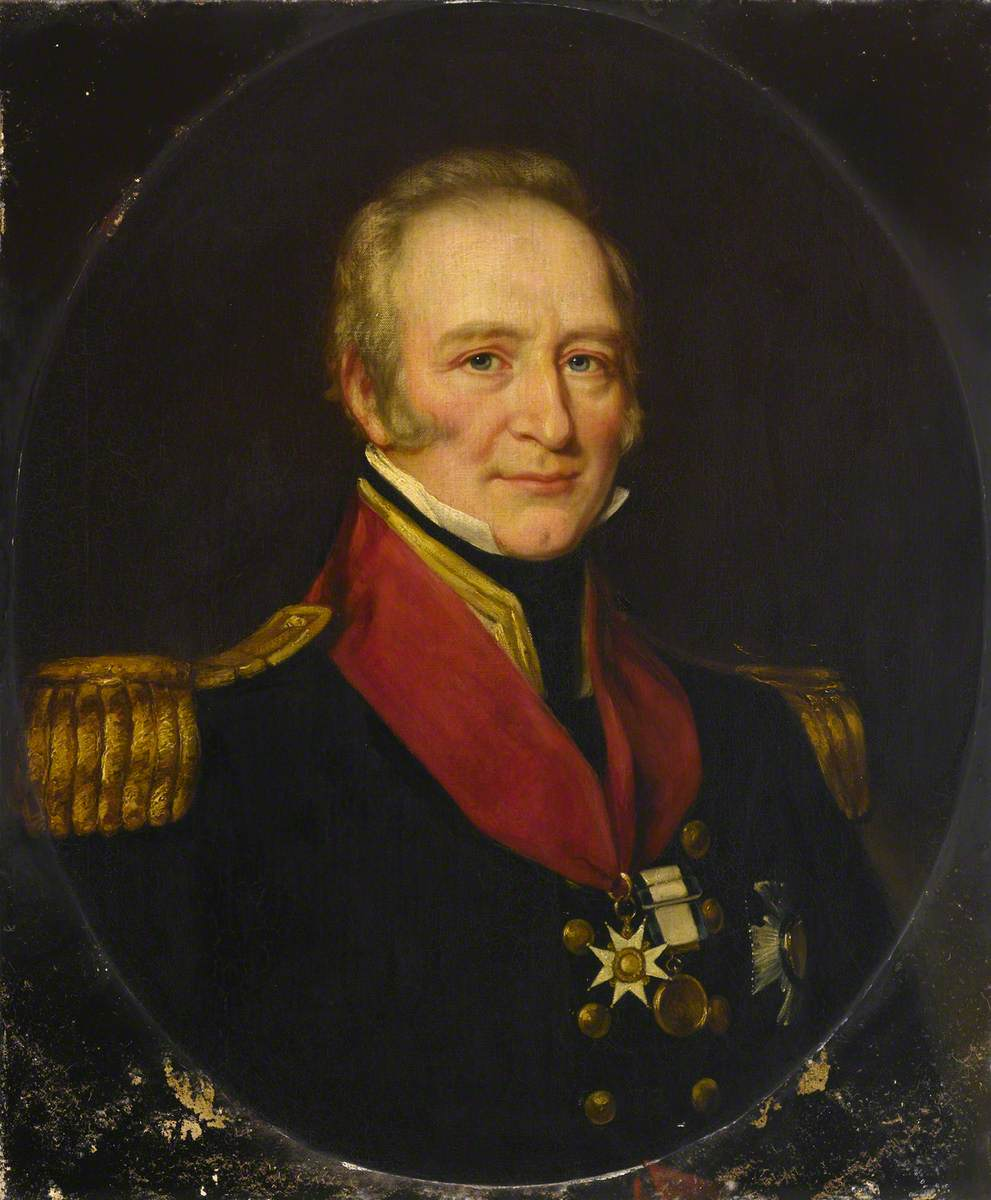
- Born: 8 November 1768; Palace, County Limerick
- Died: 9 July 1834 (aged 65); Rio de Janeiro
- Relatives: Michael Seymour (son)
- Military career
- Allegiance: Great Britain; United Kingdom
- Branch: Royal Navy
- Service years: 1780 – 1834
- Rank: Rear-Admiral
- Commands: HMS Spitfire; HMS Fisgard; HMS Amethyst; HMS Niemen; HMS Hannibal
- Conflicts: Glorious First of June; Walcheren Campaign

Rear-Admiral Sir Michael Seymour, 1st Baronet, KCB (8 November 1768 – 9 July 1834) was an officer of the Royal Navy. He served during the French Revolutionary and the Napoleonic Wars, eventually rising to the rank of rear-admiral.

== Family and early life ==
Seymour was born in Pallas, County Limerick on 8 November 1768, the second son of Reverend John Seymour and his wife Griselda. He joined the navy at the age of 12, serving as a midshipman aboard the sloop-of-war HMS Merlin, in the English Channel, under Captain James Luttrell. Seymour moved with Luttrell to HMS Portland in 1781. The Portland was then serving as the flagship of Rear-Admiral Richard Edwards, then the commander-in-chief at Newfoundland. Edwards was replaced by Vice-Admiral John Campbell in 1782, and both Luttrell and Seymour moved aboard HMS Mediator. The Mediator then returned to Britain to cruise off the French coast.

On 12 December 1782 the Mediator pursued five French frigates in the Bay of Biscay. The French formed a line of battle, confident in their superior numbers, but Luttrell engaged them, breaking their line. He overhauled one and captured her, the 24-gun Alexander, with 120 crew aboard. The remainder then fled, pursued by Luttrell. They then split up, forcing Luttrell to choose to remain with the largest. He eventually caught up with her and brought her to battle. The enemy, the 34-gun Menegere with 212 men aboard, was forced to surrender. Luttrell began the return voyage to England with his prizes, having to deal with an attempted uprising amongst his French prisoners part way through the voyage on 14 December. Despite having only 190 men to deal with 340 prisoners, the rising was quashed without bloodshed. Seymour remained aboard the Mediator until 1783, when he moved to HMS Ganges. He eventually served on a number of different ships, before receiving his commission as a lieutenant in 1790. He joined HMS Magnificent that year, but left when she was paid off in 1791.

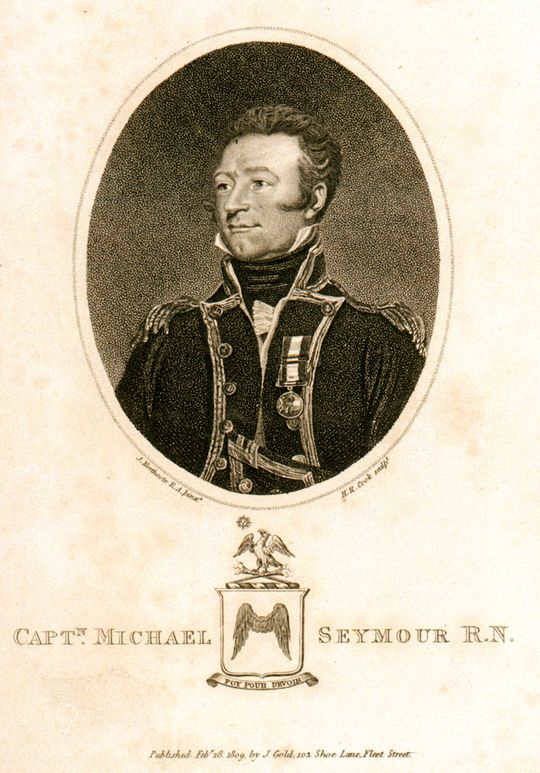
'Captn Michael Seymour R.N., depicting Sir Michael Seymour 1768-1834

== Advancement ==
Seymour returned to service with the outbreak of the French Revolutionary Wars in 1793, serving aboard HMS Marlborough under George Cranfield Berkeley. The Marlborough formed part of the fleet under Lord Howe, and Seymour was thus present at the Glorious First of June, on 1 June 1794. During the battle, the Marlborough came under attack from three French warships, the 78-gun Impétueux, the 74-gun Mucius and the 120-gun Montagne. The Marlborough was heavily damaged but was able to defend herself and resist French attempts to capture her. During the battle Seymour had his left arm shot off.

Seymour recovered from his wound, and was promoted to commander. He received his first command in mid-1796, that of the sloop HMS Spitfire. He spent the next several years cruising in the Channel, and off the French coast, before being promoted to Post-Captain on 11 August 1800, after making representations to the First Lord of the Admiralty George Spencer. During his time in home waters he was able to capture a number of small French ships and privateers. He moved to take command of HMS Fisgard in 1801, at the instigation of Admiral William Cornwallis, but the Peace of Amiens later that year left him without a ship. The resumption of hostilities led to Seymour returning to sea, spending time as acting-captain of a number of ships, before finally being offered command of the 36-gun fifth rate HMS Amethyst in 1806. On 10 November 1808 he came across the 40-gun French frigate Thetis, and after a hard fought battle, captured her. In recognition of this act Seymour received a medal from King George III, a 100 guinea piece of plate from the Lloyd's Patriotic Fund, and the Freedom of the Cities of Cork and Limerick. On 6 April 1809 he engaged, and captured the 44-gun frigate Niemen. For this he was created a baronet the following month.

== Later career ==
Seymour then served on the Walcheren Campaign, and on its conclusion, was appointed to command his prize, HMS Niemen, which had subsequently been taken into the navy. He then command the 74-gun third rate HMS Hannibal, and on 26 May 1814 he captured the 44-gun Sultane. He was nominated a Knight Commander of the Order of the Bath in January 1815 and moved aboard the Royal Yacht several years later. He became Commissioner of Portsmouth Dockyard, but after the post was abolished, was promoted to Rear-Admiral, and appointed to command the South American Station. He received a pension of £300 for the loss of his arm.

== Death ==
Seymour was already in poor health on his departure from England, and died at Rio de Janeiro on 9 July 1834. He was buried at Cemitério dos Ingleses, Gamboa on 15 July in a large funeral attended by English, French, American and Spanish officers, and other civilian officials. As a gesture of respect, the national flags on the ships in the harbour were flown at half-mast, and salutes were fired. A memorial was later erected in his memory at St Anns Church, Portsmouth.

== Family ==
Michael Seymour's younger brother, Richard, also joined the navy, reaching the rank of lieutenant. He served aboard HMS Amazon but was killed in the battle against the French frigate Belle Poule on 13 March 1806. Michael Seymour married Jane Hawker, daughter of captain James Hawker, in 1797, and the couple had five sons and three daughters. His eldest son, John, inherited the baronetcy on his father's death. His third and fourth sons, Michael and Edward, followed their father into the navy. Michael had a distinguished career, rising to the rank of admiral. Edward served briefly as flag lieutenant under his father, but died relatively young, and was posthumously promoted to commander.

== See also ==
- O'Byrne, William Richard (1849). "Seymour, Michael#cite note-Michael Seymour-1" . A Naval Biographical Dictionary . John Murray – via Wikisource.

== Notes ==
Baronetage of the United Kingdom
New creation	Baronet (of Highmount and Friery Park); 1809–1834	Succeeded by John Culme-Seymour
Military offices
Preceded by Thomas Baker	Commander-in-Chief, South America Station; 1833–1834	Succeeded by Graham Hamond
