= Sir Alexander Ball (1809 ship) =

History

United Kingdom
- Name: Sir Alexander Ball
- Namesake: Alexander Ball
- Owner: 1813: G. Sawtell & Co.; 1819: Wyllie & Co.
- Builder: France
- Launched: 1809
- Acquired: By purchase
- Fate: Last listed 1823

General characteristics
- Tons burthen: 391, or 409(bm)
- Propulsion: Sail
- Complement: 35
- Armament: 2 × 6-pounder guns + 18 × 18-pounder carronades; 16 × 18&6-pounder guns

Sir Alexander Ball was a merchant vessel launched in 1809 and built in France. She was a prize that her British owners purchased. On 16 July 1814 the famed American privateer General Armstrong captured her, but HMS Niemen recaptured her. Sir Alexander Ball then continued to trade until approximately 1823.

== Career ==
Sir Alexander Ball first appeared in the supplement to Lloyd's Register for 1812, which gave her master as J. Skinner, her owner as G. Sawtell, and her trade as Bristol — Malta. On 17 April 1812 her master, John Skynner, received a letter of marque.

In 1812, the press in Bristol carried an account that Sir Alexander Ball had made the voyage to Malta and back to Bristol in two months.

Then Sir Alexander Ball again sailed for Malta from Bristol in July. On 18 August 1812, she captured the American ship Grace Ann Green. War between America and Britain had just commenced and the American vessel was sailing from Smyrna to Philadelphia. HMS Hyacinth and HMS Blossom were in sight at the time of the capture. This was the last prize recorded as having fallen to a privateer from Bristol.

In 1813-14 Sir Alexander Ball made a triangular voyage: Bristol to Newfoundland to Jamaica to Bristol.

In mid-1814, Sir Alexander Ball was on a voyage from Bristol to Malta, with a cargo of British manufactures and colonial produce, when she encountered General Armstrong, which captured Sir Alexander Ball. Lloyd's List reported that General Armstrong had been armed with eight guns and had a crew of 65 men. The engagement had taken 15 to 20 minutes and had occurred at 39°45′N 10°39′W, some 80 miles from Lisbon. In the engagement Sir Alexander Ball suffered six wounded, two probably fatally. The crew was taken to Lisbon.

Sir Alexander Ball was on her way to America with a prize crew when on 15 July 1814, Niemen recaptured her. At the time of her recapture Sir Alexander Ball carried six guns and a crew of 35 men. She reached Halifax, Nova Scotia, on 20 July.

Sir Alexander Ball was sold out of Bristol ownership. Lloyd's List reported that on 27 September 1815 Sir Alexander Ball, "Rogers", master, had been "all well" eight days out of Britain while on her was to New Orleans. She was at 38°30′N 14°0′W. Shortly thereafter she was reported as having had to put into "Hayti" in distress and having had to discharge her cargo. On 29 May 1816, Sir Alexander Ball was reported at Cape Henry, Saint Domingue.

The next readily available Lloyd's Register (1819) gave her master as W. Brooke, her owner as Wyllie & Co., and her trade as London—Saint Thomas. This entry continued unchanged until 1823, after which Sir Alexander Ball was no longer listed.
