= Chaugey =

- Commune
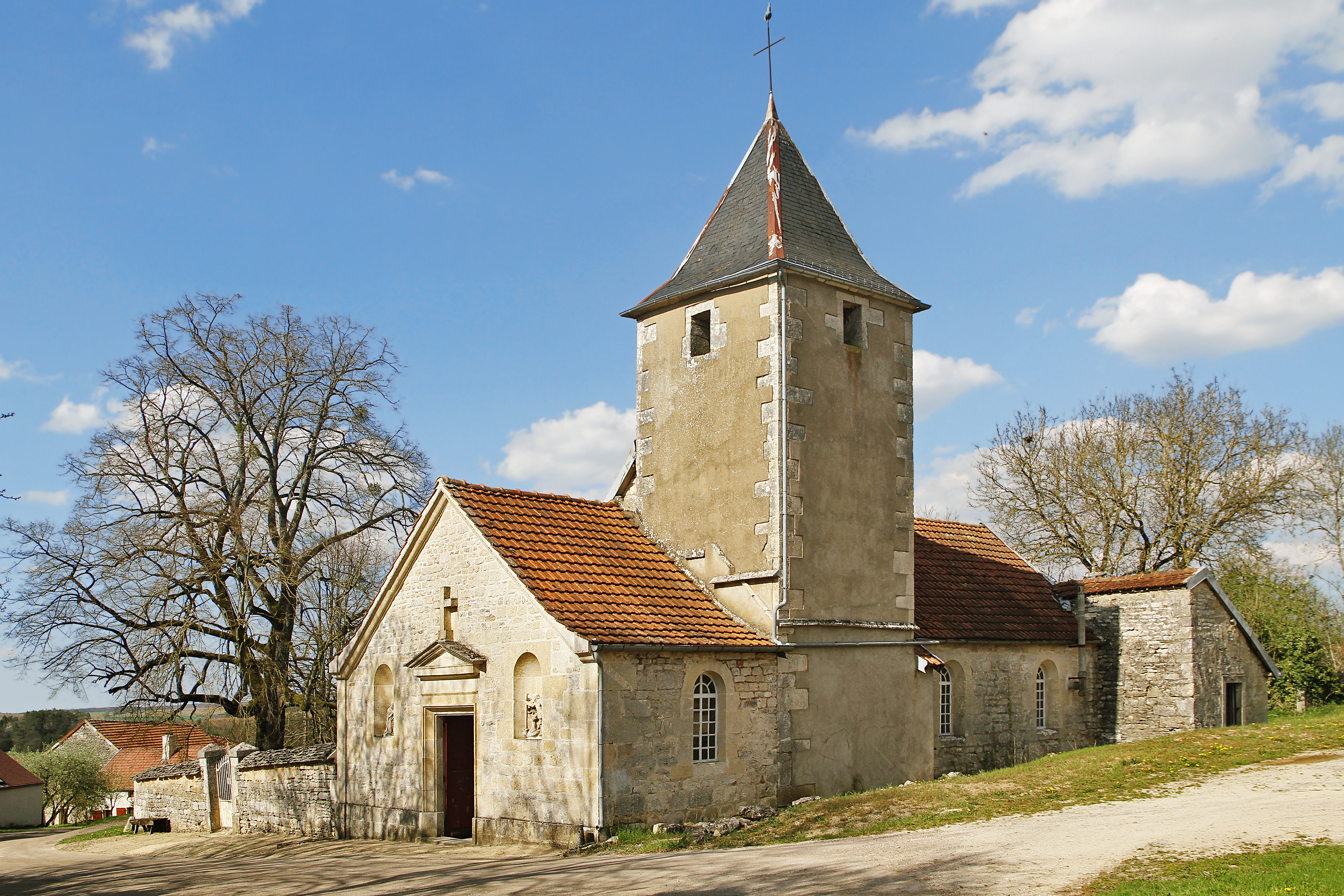
- The church in Chaugey

- Coat of arms
- Location of Chaugey
- Location within France Location within Bourgogne-Franche-Comté
- Coordinates: 47°45′10″N 4°57′05″E
- Country: France
- Region: Bourgogne-Franche-Comté
- Department: Côte-d'Or
- Arrondissement: Montbard
- Canton: Châtillon-sur-Seine
- Intercommunality: Pays Châtillonnais

Government
  - Mayor (2021–2026): Violaine Monmarché
- Area^{1}: 6.89 km^{2} (2.66 sq mi)
- Elevation: 468 m (1,535 ft)
- Highest elevation: 468 m (1,535 ft)
- Lowest elevation: 325 m (1,066 ft)
- Population (2023): 24
  - Density: 3.5/km^{2} (9.0/sq mi)
- Time zone: UTC+01:00 (CET)
  - Summer (DST): UTC+02:00 (CEST)
- INSEE/Postal code: 21157 /21290
- ^{1} French Land Register data, which excludes lakes, ponds, glaciers > 1 km^{2} (0.386 sq mi or 247 acres) and river estuaries.

Chaugey (French pronunciation: [ʃoʒɛ]) is a commune in the Côte-d'Or department in eastern France.

== Population ==
Historical population
Year	Pop.	±% p.a.
1968	52	—
1975	41	−3.34%
1982	25	−6.82%
1990	19	−3.37%
1999	13	−4.13%
2007	18	+4.15%
2012	23	+5.02%
2017	17	−5.87%
2023	24	+5.92%
Source: INSEE

== See also ==
- Communes of the Côte-d'Or department
