= HMS Niemen (1809) =

Frigate of the Royal Navy

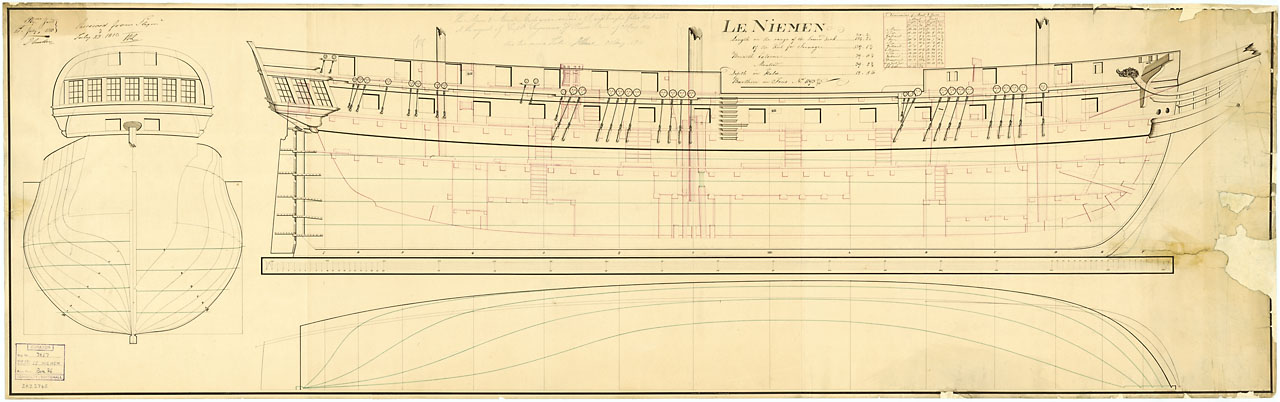
- Niemen

History

France
- Name: Niémen
- Namesake: Neman River
- Builder: Chantier Courau Frères, Bordeaux
- Laid down: May 1807
- Launched: 8 November 1808
- In service: January 1809
- Captured: 6 April 1809, by the Royal Navy

United Kingdom
- Name: HMS Niemen
- Acquired: 5 April 1809
- Fate: Broken up in September 1815

General characteristics
- Class & type: Armide class
- Type: 38-gun fifth-rate frigate
- Displacement: 1430 tonneaux
- Tons burthen: 759 port tonneaux; 1,093 37/94 (bm)
- Length: 154 ft 2 1/2 in (47.0 m) (gundeck); 129 ft 1 3/4 in (39.4 m) (keel)
- Beam: 39 ft 10 3/4 in (12.2 m)
- Draught: 12 ft 5 7/8 in (3.8 m)
- Sail plan: Full-rigged ship
- Complement: 300 (later 315)
- Armament: French service; 28 × 18-pounder guns; 8 × 8-pounder guns; 8 × 36-pounder carronades; British service; Upper deck: 28 × 18-pounders; QD: 14 × 32-pounder carronades; Fc: 2 × 9-pounder guns + 2 × 32-pounder carronades

HMS Niemen was a Royal Navy 38-gun fifth-rate frigate. She began her career as the Niémen, a 44-gun French Navy Armide-class frigate, designed by Pierre Rolland. She was only in French service for a few months when in 1809 she encountered some British frigates. The British captured her and she continued in British service as Niemen. In British service she cruised in the Atlantic and North American waters, taking numerous small American prizes, some privateers but mostly merchantmen. She was broken up in 1815, at the end of the Napoleonic Wars and the War of 1812.

== Construction and capture ==
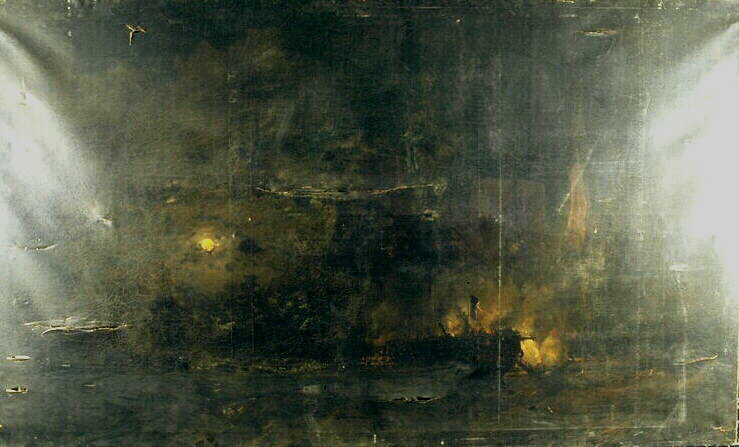
French frigate Niémen fighting against HMS Amethyst and Arethusa at the Battle of Niemen, by Jean-Baptiste Henri Durand-Brager

Chantier Courau Frères at Bordeaux built Niémen to a design by Pierre Rolland, carrying 40 guns. She was launched in 1808 but spent only months in French service. She was commissioned at Bordeaux on 22 November 1808, but not completed until January 1809. On 4 April 1809 she sailed under the command of Commandant Jean Dupotet for Fort-de-France with stores and a substantial crew of 319.

Two days later, as she was in the Bay of Biscay, she encountered three British vessels, including the 36-gun frigate HMS Amethyst, under the command of Captain Sir Michael Seymour. Also sailing in company with Amethyst were the 36-gun HMS Emerald, (Captain Frederick Lewis Maitland), and the 38-gun HMS Arethusa, (Captain Robert Mends).

Seymour, who had previously won fame by capturing the French frigate Thétis the previous November, gave chase at 11am. After a sustained chase lasting all day, the Amethyst lost sight of the Emerald, which could not match the speed of the two others, and had failed to gain on the Niémen. Seymour then wore his ship around and was able to bring himself close to the Niémen at 9.30pm.

The two ships began exchanging fire at 11.30pm, with Amethyst coming alongside at 1am on the morning of 5 April to exchange sustained broadsides. By 3am the Niémen had lost her main and mizzen masts, and her fire was slackening. The Arethusa then arrived on the scene, firing a couple of broadsides at the badly damaged French ship. At this point Niémen surrendered. Other accounts report that during the night, Niémen maneuvered to capture Amethyst, when Arethusa came to the rescue and forced Niémen to strike her colours.

Regardless, Niémen had surrendered, having lost 47 killed and 73 wounded, compared to eight killed and 37 wounded on the Amethyst. Sir Michael brought her in as a prize, and was rewarded with a baronetcy for his actions in capturing the Niémen, and the earlier capture of the Thetis. In 1847 the Admiralty authorized the issue of the Naval General Service Medal with clasp "Amethyst 5 April 1809" to be awarded upon application to all British participants still living in 1847.

== HMS Niemen ==
The Admiralty purchased Niémen for the sum of £29,979 2s 10d in prize money; the Royal Navy took her into service and commissioned her as HMS Niemen. Nieman arrived at Portsmouth on 26 April. There she underwent a Small Repair between August and November. Her captor, Sir Michael Seymour, was appointed to command her in September 1809.

At some point in late 1809 or early 1810 she captured the Portuguese brig Rio Douro and the American ship Orion. On 15 May 1810 she left on a cruise in the Atlantic. On 30 November she captured Betsy.

In 1811 she was on the Irish station, based at Cork. On 3 January Niemen captured Danube, bound from New York to Bordeaux. On 9 January she recaptured the brig Unanimity. Then on 4 March Niemen captured the Charleston packet.

Under Captain Thomas Young, and in company with Fortunee, Niemen captured the American brig Meteor on 26 July.

During the year she took the American gun-vessel Charlestown, and the American schooner Purse, Captain Samuel Turner, sailing from New York to Bordeaux. The cause, at least in the case of Purse, was breach of the blockade of France. However, the crew of Purse recaptured their vessel, after killing Midshipman Sanders, the Prize Master from Niemen. On 29 May 1812 on her return trip to New York with a valuable cargo of brandy, wine, and silks, Purse encountered Armide. After a 14-hour chase during which Purse's fore-top mast was shot away, Armide captured her. Purse's master and crew were brought into Plymouth in irons. (Note: Whether or not they stood trial for the murder of Sanders is not currently known.)

On 4 December Niemen was in company with Armide when Armide captured the brig Female.

On 21 January 1812 Niemen and Medusa captured Arno. Then on 29 January Niemen captured Abigail. Two days later, Niemen was in company with the British privateer Pheasant when they captured the American brig Hannibal. Betsey followed on 18 March, with Medusa in company with Niemen. Next, Niemen captured Vesta on 18 April. Lastly, Niemen captured Lark on 28 April.

In March 1812 Captain Samuel Pym was appointed to command Niemen however he actually took command after April. On 4 January 1813 Niemen sailed with a convoy for Saint Helena. On 19 December Niemen captured the ship Stockholm.

In August or so, while Niemen was off Rochefort, she sent her four of her boats in to attack a convoy lying there. During the night, before the boats arrived, the convoy moved, except for one chasse-marée, which the boats captured. However, the tide turned and a French brig came out of the Loire. She succeeded in recapturing the chasse-marée, as well as the 15-man crew of the British boat that had taken her. Niemen then sailed to North America to join a squadron under Admiral Sir John Borlase Warren, which had already left.

On 19 December Niemen shared with Jaseur in the capture of Rising States. Jaseur shared her prize money, by agreement, with Belvidera and Narcissus.

Niemen escorted a convoy to Bermuda in January 1814, and then spent 1814 on the Bermuda station. Here she took some numerous prizes, most of them small schooners, but a few of greater import.

- 2 January: Lion, of Nantucket, Clarke, master, returning from the Chilean coast with 1000 barrels of whale oil, and sent into Bermuda; Lion was returning from her tenth whaling voyage.
- 8 February: the American 9-gun letter of marque packet Bourdeaux.
- 8 May: the merchantman Hound.
- 23 May: Niemen's boats cut out three American letter of marque schooners at Little Egg Harbour: Quiz, of 214 tons, W. Phillips, master, 28 men, pierced for 14 guns but mounting two, and Clara, James Newman, master, and Model, each pierced for 12. The cutting out expedition suffered two men killed and two men wounded. When captured, Quiz was sailing from St. Iago to Philadelphia with a cargo of sugar, molasses, and coffee. Clara, of 117 tons and 22 men, was armed with four 6-pounder guns. Model, John Austen, master, was of 250 tons and was carrying a cargo of 270 barrels of flour. (Note: A first-class share of the prize money was worth £48 3s 1 1/4d; a sixth-class share, that of an ordinary seaman, was worth 6s.)
- 7 June: sloop Flash, James Barstow, Master. Niemen shared the capture with Saturn.
- 12 July: Niemen captured the American privateer Henry Guilder (or Henry Gilder), Samuel Newson, Master, of 12 guns (eight 12-pounders and two long 9-pounders), and 45 or 50 men. (Note: A first-class share of the prize money was worth £46 3s 7 3/4d; a sixth-class share was worth 5s 6d.) Henry Guilder was sold at the prize court's auction in August at Halifax and became the (unsuccessful) British privateer Sherbrooke.
- 15 July: Niemen recaptured Sir Alexander Ball, which the American privateer General Armstrong had taken as Sir Alexander Ball was sailing from Bristol to Malta with a cargo of British manufactures and colonial produce. She carried six guns and a crew of 35 men.
- 7 August: the Swedish brig Enigheton or Enigheden, sailing from St. Andrews to Philadelphia with a cargo of plaster of Paris and of hardware.
- 30 August: the merchantman Enterprise, sailing from Barnstable to Washington with salt and Glauber salts.
- 2 September: the merchantman Los Dos Ermanos.
- 5 September: the merchantman James, sailing from Washington to New York with a cargo of flour.
- 21 September: the merchantman Swift.
- 30 September: the Baltimore letter of marque Daedalus, off Chincoteague, and the merchantman Hibernia. Daedalus was sailing from Port au Prince to New York with a cargo of coffee. Daedalus, a schooner of 136 tons, was armed with a 9-pounder gun and a 6-pounder gun. She had a crew of 19 men.
- 3 October: the merchantman Tickler, sailing from Philadelphia to Saint Bartholomew with flour, bread, crackers and soap. She was under the command of John Boyd, Master. Niemen shared the capture with Loire. Tickler was of 41 tons and carried a crew of six men.
- 1 December: the merchantman Industry, off Cape Henry.
- Unknown date: the merchantman Janus.

Also between 6 August and October, Niemen captured the following American vessels: the sloop James Phillip and the sloop Regulator. In the period from 9 May to 4 October, Niemen also burnt 17 schooners or sloops ranging between 15 and 60 tons.

== Fate ==
Nieman was broken up at Deptford in September 1815. Her name was perpetuated in a 28-gun sixth rate launched in 1820 as HMS Niemen.

== Postscript ==
In 1843 Jean-Baptiste Henri Durand-Brager made a painting of the battle, Combat de la frégate Niemen contre les frégates Aréthusa et Amethyst. It is at the Bordeaux Museum of Fine Arts but not on display.
