= French ship Charlemagne (1807) =

Ship of the line of the French Navy

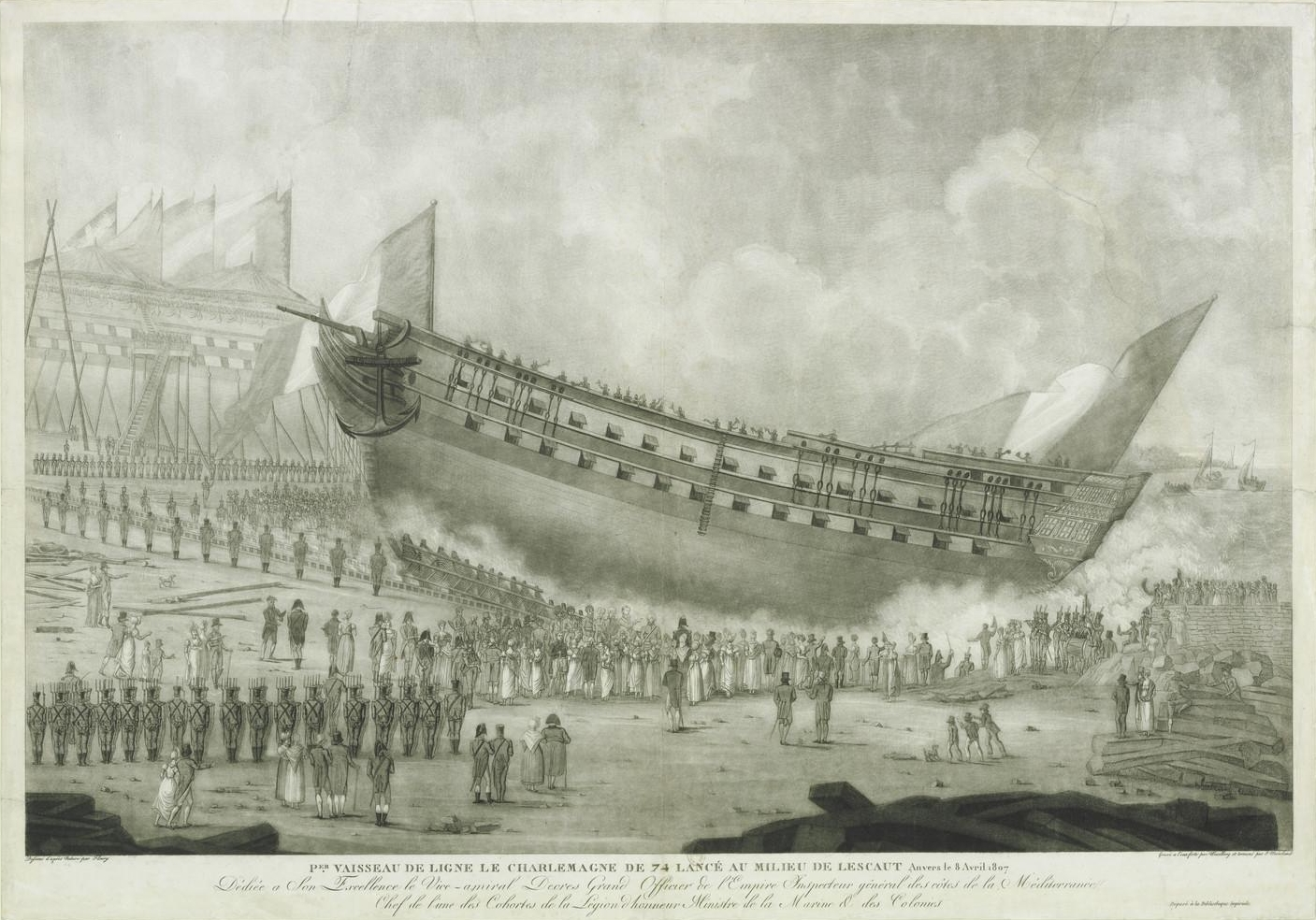
- Illustration of Charlemagne being launched before Napoleon

History

France
- Name: Charlemagne
- Namesake: Charlemagne
- Ordered: 4 January 1803
- Builder: Antwerp
- Laid down: May 1804
- Launched: 8 April 1807
- Stricken: 30 August 1814
- Fate: Ceded to the Netherlands, broken up 1823

General characteristics
- Class & type: petit Téméraire-class ship of the line
- Displacement: 2,781 tonneaux
- Tons burthen: 1,381 port tonneaux
- Length: 53.97 m (177 ft 1 in)
- Beam: 14.29 m (46 ft 11 in)
- Draught: 6.72 m (22.0 ft)
- Depth of hold: 6.9 m (22 ft 8 in)
- Sail plan: Full-rigged ship
- Crew: 705
- Armament: 74 guns: Lower gun deck: 28 × 36 pdr guns; Upper gun deck: 30 × 18 pdr guns; Forecastle and Quarterdeck: 12 × 8 pdr guns & 14 × 36 pdr carronades

Charlemagne was a 74-gun petite Téméraire-class ship of the line built for the French Navy during the first decade of the 19th century. Completed in 1808, she played a minor role in the Napoleonic Wars.

== Background and description ==
Charlemagne was one of the petit modèle of the Téméraire class that was specially intended for construction in some of the shipyards in countries occupied by the French, where there was less depth of water than in the main French shipyards. The ships had a length of 53.97 metres (177 ft 1 in), a beam of 14.29 metres (46 ft 11 in) and a depth of hold of 6.9 metres (22 ft 8 in). The ships displaced 2,781 tonneaux and had a mean draught of 6.72 metres (22 ft 1 in). They had a tonnage of 1,381 port tonneaux. Their crew numbered 705 officers and ratings during wartime. They were fitted with three masts and ship rigged.

The muzzle-loading, smoothbore armament of the Téméraire class consisted of twenty-eight 36-pounder long guns on the lower gun deck and thirty 18-pounder long guns on the upper gun deck. The petit modèle ships ordered in 1803–1804 were intended to mount sixteen 8-pounder long guns on their forecastle and quarterdeck, plus four 36-pounder obusiers on the poop deck (dunette). Later ships were intended to have fourteen 8-pounders and ten 36-pounder carronades without any obusiers, but the numbers of 8-pounders and carronades actually varied between a total of 20 to 26 weapons. Charlemagne had a dozen 8-pounders and 14 carronades.

== Construction and career ==
Charlemagne was ordered on 24 April 1804 and was laid down the following month in Antwerp. The ship was launched on 8 April 1807. She was commissioned the following day and completed in March 1808. Charlemagne was stationed in Vlissingen under Commander Dupotet, in the squadron of Vice-Amiral Missiessy. She participated in the defence of Antwerp against the amphibious raid led by Chatham, and again during the Siege of Antwerp in 1814.

After the Bourbon Restoration, on 30 August 1814, Charlemagne was transferred to the Royal Netherlands Navy, as per the Treaty of Paris. The Dutch renamed her Nassau, and she served for nine years before being decommissioned and broken up in 1823.
