= French ship Charlemagne (1851) =

French ship

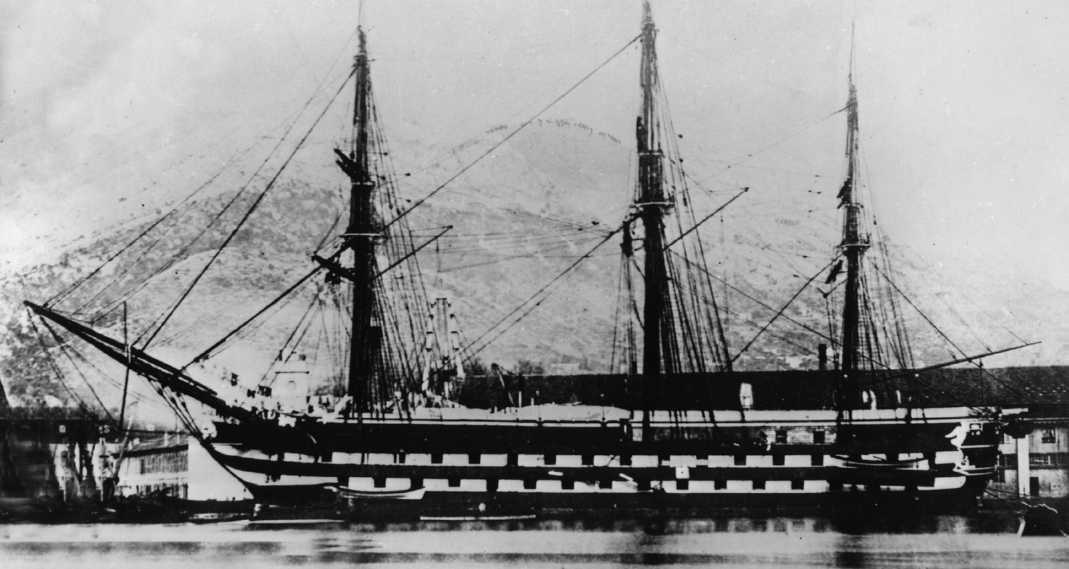

History

France
- Name: Charlemagne
- Namesake: Charlemagne
- Builder: Arsenal de Toulon
- Laid down: April 1834
- Launched: 16 January 1851
- Commissioned: 14 September 1851
- Renamed: From Hector, 2 April 1850
- Stricken: 7 February 1882
- Fate: Scrapped, 1884

General characteristics (as built)
- Type: 3rd rank ship of the line
- Displacement: 4,124 tonneaux
- Length: 59.8 m (196 ft 2 in) (waterline)
- Beam: 16.24 m (53 ft 3 in)
- Draught: 7.9 m (25 ft 11 in)
- Depth: 8.05 m (26 ft 5 in)
- Installed power: 4 × boilers; 1,206 ihp (1,223 PS; 899 kW)
- Propulsion: 1 × shaft; 1 × direct-acting steam engine
- Sail plan: Ship rig
- Speed: 8.5 knots (15.7 km/h; 9.8 mph)
- Complement: 814
- Armament: 24 × 30-pounder long guns (lower deck); 6 × 22 cm (8.7 in) long Paixhans guns (lower deck); 26 × 30-pounder short guns (upper deck); 6 × 22 cm (8.7 in) short Paixhans guns (upper deck); 18 × 16 cm (6.3 in) Paixhans guns (quarterdeck and forecastle)

Charlemagne was an 80-gun steam-powered ship of the line built for the French Navy. She had been laid down as the sailing ship of the line Hector and remained on the stocks until she was chosen for conversion to steam power and renamed in 1850. Completed in 1851, the ship was assigned to the Mediterranean Squadron where she participated in the Crimean War of 1854–1855. After the war Charlemagne was reduced to reserve in 1857. The ship was converted to a transport in 1867–1868, but spent most of the rest of her career still in reserve. She was stricken from the navy list in 1882 and scrapped two years later.

== Description ==
Charlemagne had a length at the waterline of 59.8 metres (196 ft 2 in), a beam of 16.24 metres (53 ft 3 in) and a depth of hold of 8.05 metres (26 ft 5 in). The ship displaced 4,124 and had a draught of 7.9 metres (25 ft 11 in). Her crew numbered 814 officers and ratings. Charlemagne was powered by a direct-acting steam engine that drove the single propeller shaft using steam provided by four boilers. The engine, built by La Ciotat, was rated at 450 nominal horsepower and produced 1,206 indicated horsepower (1,223 PS; 899 kW). The ship stowed 260 t (256 long tons) of coal for her engine. During her sea trials, Charlemagne reached a sustained speed of 8.5 knots (15.7 km/h; 9.8 mph) under steam and 11 knots (20 km/h; 13 mph) under sail. She was fitted with three masts and ship rigged like the 80-gun sailing ships of the line in service.

The armament of the Charlemagne consisted of twenty-four 30-pounder smoothbore long guns and six 22 cm (8.7 in) Paixhans guns on the lower gundeck. On the upper gundeck were twenty-four 30-pound short guns and six 22 cm Paixhans guns. On the quarterdeck and forecastle were eighteen 16 cm (6.3 in) Paixhans guns.

== Construction and career ==
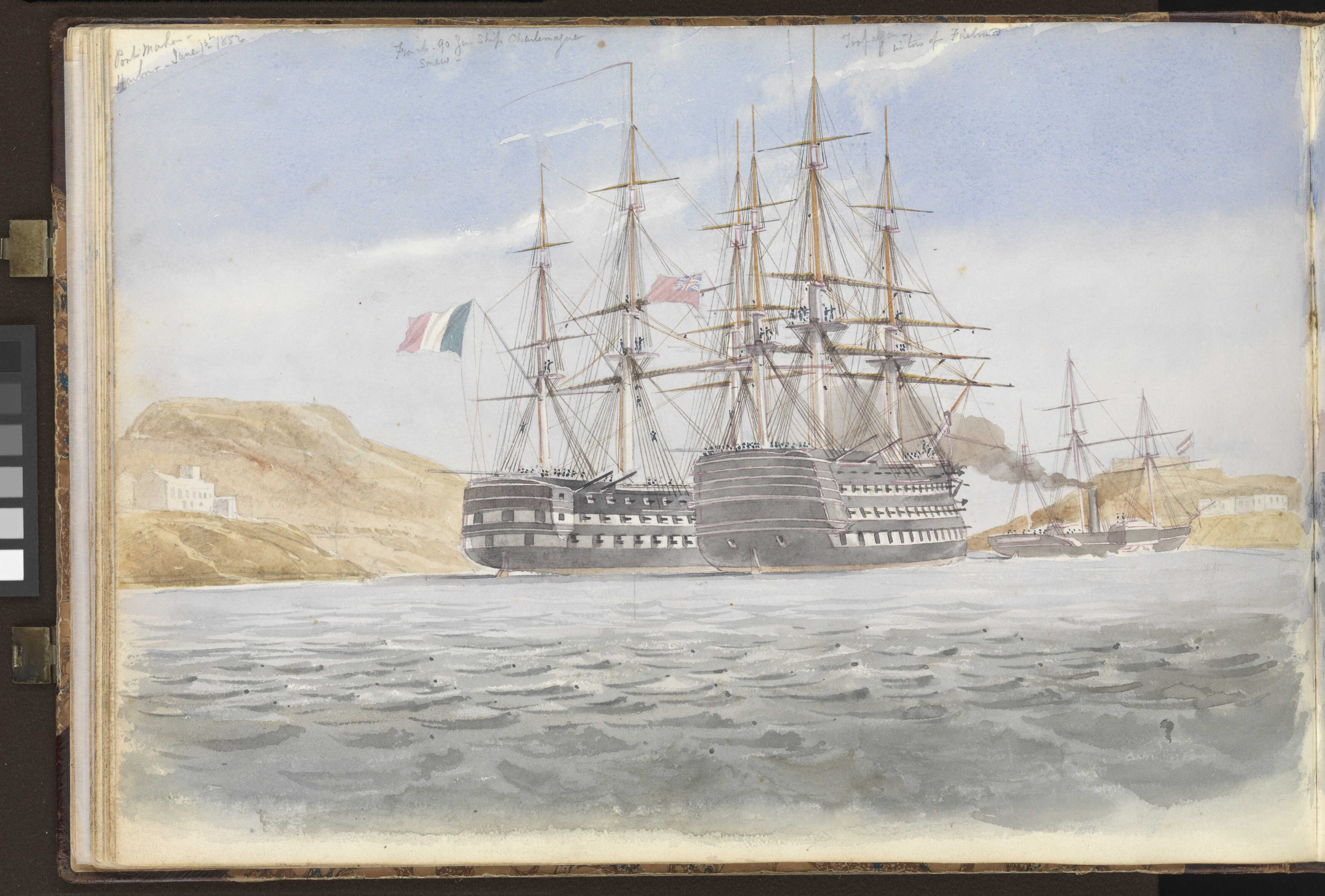
'Charlemagne' (left), with 'HMS Trafalgar' leaving Mahón under tow by 'HMS Firebrand', 1 June 1852

Charlemagne had been laid down as a 90-gun 3rd-rank Suffren-class ship of the line in April 1834 under the name of Hector at the Arsenal de Toulon, but construction was suspended before she was launched. The ship was renamed Charlemagne on 2 April 1850. Her incomplete hull was kept in a covered slipway until she began her conversion into a steam-powered ship in September. Major modifications to her hull were limited to lengthening her 2.6 m (8 ft 6 in) for a hoisting mechanism for her propeller to eliminate its drag while under sail. She was launched on 16 January 1851 and commissioned on 14 September 1851 before being completed in December.

Charlemagne was assigned to the Mediterranean Fleet upon her completion. The ship was sent by Napoleon III to the Black Sea as a show of force in violation of the London Straits Convention in 1854. She participated in the bombardment of the Russian fortifications on 17 October during the Siege of Sevastopol and was damaged by a shell exploding in her engine room. Charlemagne was placed in reserve on 16 September 1857 and was converted into a transport in 1867–1868 with her armament reduced to eight guns. Aside from her trials over the following two years, the ship spent the rest of her career in reserve. Charlemagne was stricken from the navy list on 7 February 1882 and broken up in 1884.
