= HMS Termagant (1796) =

Sloop of the Royal Navy

History

Great Britain
- Name: HMS Termagant
- Ordered: 24 January 1795
- Builder: John Dudman, Deptford
- Laid down: May 1795
- Launched: 23 April 1796
- Honours and awards: Naval General Service Medal with clasp "Egypt"
- Fate: Sold for breaking up on 3 February 1819

General characteristics
- Class & type: 18-gun sloop-of-war (as designed); Re-classed as 20-gun sixth rate in late 1811
- Tons burthen: 4273/94 (bm)
- Length: 110 ft 2 in (33.58 m) (gundeck); 90 ft 8 1/2 in (27.648 m) (keel)
- Beam: 29 ft 9 in (9.07 m)
- Depth of hold: 8 ft 6 in (2.59 m)
- Sail plan: Full-rigged ship
- Complement: 121
- Armament: As built; Gundeck: 18 × 6-pounder guns; QD: 6 × 12-pounder carronades; Fc: 2 × 12-pounder carronades; After rearmament; Gundeck: 18 × 32-pounder carronades; QD: 6 × 12-pounder carronades; Fc: 2 × 12-pounder carronades + 2 × 6-pounder guns

HMS Termagant was an 18-gun sloop of the Royal Navy. She was launched in 1796 and sold in 1819.

== Career ==
Termagant performed convoy duty during the French Revolutionary Wars, shuttling between The Nore and Riga under Commander David Lloyd in mid-1797 in the company of HMS Clyde.

On 28 December 1797 Termagant was four leagues off Spurn Head when she sighted and gave chase to a French privateer. After four hours Termagant succeeded in capturing the schooner Victoire, of 14 guns and 74 men. She had been out ten days during which time she had captured two colliers; she had been in pursuit of a British merchantman when Termagant first sighted her. The Royal Navy took Victoire into service as Victoire.

On 1 September 1800, Termagant, Captain Skipsey, captured the French Navy polacca Capricieuse some 30 leagues west of Corsica after a two-hour chase. Capricieuse was armed with six guns and had a crew of 68 men under the command of enseigne de vaisseau Gandserrand. She was three days out of Toulon and was sailing to Egypt with 350 stands of arms, shot, a French general, and a Chef de Bataillon. She was also carrying dispatches, which however she was able to destroy before the British boarded her. (Note: Capricieuse was the tartane or aviso Caramagnole, launched at Toulon in July 1793 and renamed Capricieuse on 30 May 1795. She had originally been armed with two 12-pounder and two 6-pounder guns, and had an official complement of 35 men.) Three days later and some 10 leagues away, Termagant captured the privateer General Holtz, of two guns and 26 men. Skipsey scuttled and sank the privateer.

On 3 October 1800 an unidentified Royal Navy ship arrived in Algiers with orders to perform a favor for the Dey of Algiers of transporting gifts and personnel to Constantinople. The Day refused use of the ship, and HMS Termagant sailed from Algiers on 10 October.

On 12 January 1801, Termagant, Captain Skipsey, and Port Mahon, Captain Buchanan, captured the French Navy's half-xebec Guerrier. Guerrier was sailing from Toulon to Alexandria, Egypt, with a cargo of arms and ammunition. (Note: French records indicate that Toulon Dockyard had built the 4-gun Guerrier in 1800, and that she was commissioned there on 23 September 1800. When captured she was in the Eastern Mediterranean and under the command of enseigne de vaisseau Vallat.)

Because Termagant served in the navy's Egyptian campaign (8 March to 2 September 1801), her officers and crew qualified for the clasp "Egypt" to the Naval General Service Medal that the Admiralty authorized in 1850 to all surviving claimants. (Note: A first-class share of the prize money awarded in April 1823 was worth £34 2s 4d; a fifth-class share, that of a seaman, was worth 3s 11½d. The amount was small as the total had to be shared between 79 vessels and the entire army contingent.)

Reportedly a "little time" before 15 June, 1803 she was attacked by a Tripolitan xebec 18-20 guns, probably mistaking her for USS Adams, a hot reply caused the xebec to strike her colors.

She was at Gibraltar 22 July, 1804.

23 February, 1805 "Termagant", Lt. Robert Pettet, was at sea in the area of Malta.

In May 1812, Termagant, Captain Gawen William Rowan-Hamilton, Hyacinth, and Basilisk, supported Spanish guerrillas on the coast of Granada. Termagant destroyed the castle at Nerja on 20 May. The British squadron then supported a guerrilla offensive against Almuñécar. On 24 May with Hyacinth and Basilisk, Termagant took a French privateer of two guns and 30 or 40 men under the castle. The British squadron bombarded the castle, breaching the walls. The French then retreated to Grenada. Termagant's only casualty was one man wounded. Prize money for the "capture of a brass gun and the destruction of a French privateer, name unknown" was payable in March 1836. (Note: A first-class share was worth £23 18s 6d; a sixth-class share, that of an ordinary seaman, was worth 5s 7½d.)

== Fate ==
On 3 February 1819 the "Principal Officers and Commissioners of His Majesty's Navy" offered "Termagant, of 28 guns and 427 tons", "lying at Chatham" for sale. Termagant was sold on 3 February 1819 to James Graham, of Harwich, for £1,460. 1819.
