= French frigate Thétis (1788) =

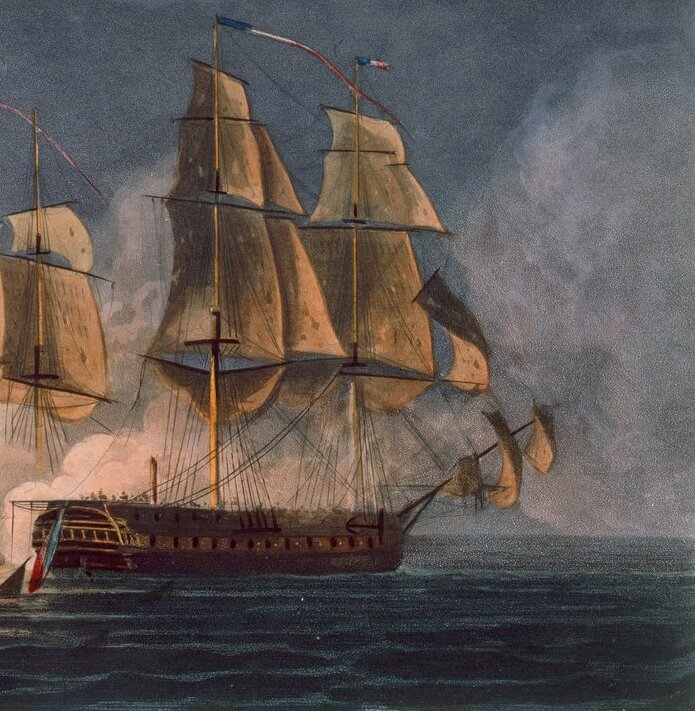
- Thétis at the action of 10 November 1808

History

France
- Name: Thétis
- Ordered: 4 November 1786
- Builder: Brest
- Laid down: September 1785
- Launched: 16 June 1788
- Captured: 10 November 1808

United Kingdom
- Name: Brune
- Stricken: 1838
- Fate: Broken up 1838

General characteristics
- Class & type: Nymphe-class frigate
- Displacement: 1,423 tonneaux
- Tons burthen: 744 port tonneaux
- Length: 46.9 m (154 ft)
- Beam: 11.9 m (39 ft)
- Height: 5.8 m (19 ft)
- Sail plan: Full-rigged ship
- Armament: At capture; Gundeck: 26 × 18-pounder (24-pounder English) long guns; QD: 12 × 36-pounders (42-pounder English; presumably carronades); Fc: 4 × 8-pounder guns

Thétis was a 40-gun Nymphe-class frigate of the French Navy.

== French career ==
From 1790, she served in various diplomatic missions in the Indian Ocean, before returning for a refit in Brest in 1793. From 1795, she was shuttled from France to Guadeloupe. She took part in the Invisible Squadron of Zacharie Allemand, before returning to Martinique along with the 16-gun brig Lynx.

On 17 December 1806, Thétis and the brig Sylphe captured HMS Netley. The French sold Netley and she became the privateer Duquesne. Less than nine months later, on 23 September 1807, HMS Blonde captured Dusquesne. (The Chroniques de la Marine Française report that in 1807, Thétis captured an 18-gun brig named Methly. This may be a slightly garbled reference to the capture of Netley, there being no Royal Navy vessel named Methly.)

HMS Amethyst captured Thétis off Lorient in the action of 10 November 1808. British casualties in the engagement were severe, with 19 killed and 51 wounded, but French losses were several times larger, with 135 dead, including her commander, Capitaine de Vaisseau Jacques Pinsum, and 102 wounded.

== British career ==
The Royal Navy took her into service as HMS Brune. She was intentionally stripped of a portion of her heavy armament to serve - En flûte - as a military troopship and store transport.

On 6 November 1813, Brune arrived at Plymouth, having departed Lisbon. From here, on 18 November she headed to the Motherbank near Spitbank, being quarantined, and moored there on 19 November. On 9 December 1813, Brune arrived at Deal, having departed Portsmouth. She was to embark General Graham and his troops. The Dictator, Grampus, Ulysses and Regulus were assembled. On 15 December 1813 Brune sailed for Holland, escorting eleven transports and two cutters. On 26 March 1814, Brune arrived at Portsmouth, having departed The Downs.

During the War of 1812, Brune was in a flotilla of troopships, ferrying the 3rd Royal Marine Battalion commanded by Major George Lewis. The infantry companies were aboard HMS Regulus, HMS Melpomene and HMS Brune, with the artillery aboard HMS Tonnant. The battalion embarked on 29 March 1814, set sail on 7 April, and disembarked at Bermuda. After a sojourn, they sailed for the Chesapeake on 30 June, and joined Admiral Cockburn's squadron on 16 July. After raiding the coast of Virginia, these forces participated during the Chesapeake campaign from August to September 1814 From January to March, she participated in the operations in Georgia.

The Brune departed Bermuda on 21 April 1815, and arrived at Halifax on 28 April, whereupon 200 Black refugees were disembarked.

On 3 June 1815 Brune arrived at Portsmouth, 24 days after leaving Halifax.

== Fate ==
Brune was broken up in 1838.
