= Coromandel =

Coromandel may refer to:

== Places ==
=== India ===
- Coromandel Coast, India
  - Presidency of Coromandel and Bengal Settlements
  - Dutch Coromandel
- Coromandel, KGF, Karnataka, India

=== New Zealand ===
- Coromandel Peninsula, on the North Island
  - Coromandel, New Zealand, a town on the peninsula
  - Coromandel Range, ridge of hills in the peninsula
  - Coromandel (electorate), spanning the peninsula

=== Elsewhere ===
- Coromandel, Minas Gerais, a Brazilian municipality
- Coromandel, Mauritius, a town in the Republic of Mauritius
- Coromandel Valley, South Australia, a suburb of Adelaide
- Coromandel East, a suburb of Adelaide

== Vessels ==
- HMS Coromandel, one of four former ships of the British Royal Navy
- Coromandel (ship): a number of merchant vessels have also been named Coromandel

== Other ==
- Coromandel International, an Indian corporation
- Coromandel railway station, on the Belair railway line in Blackwood, South Australia
- Coromandel Express, a train service along the Coromandel Coast
- Coromandel!, 1955 historical novel by John Masters
- Coromandel screen, an item of furniture
- Coromandel wood, another name for calamander
- Coromandel, a perfume created for Chanel by Jacques Polge and Christopher Sheldrake
