= Coromandel (ship) =

Numerous vessels have borne the name Coromandel, named for the Coromandel Coast.

- Coromandel (1793 ship) was the French sailing ship Modeste, captured in 1793 and repaired at Chittagong, India (now Bangladesh). She made two convict transport voyages to Port Jackson, the first for the British East India Company (EIC). She foundered in 1821.
- Coromandel (1806) was a sloop of 310 tons (bm), built in Philadelphia. Lloyd's Register for 1813 gives her master's name as E. Hunt, and her owner as Davy & Co. This may have been Coromandel, Messervy, master, that the letter of marque Echo, of Malta, captured on 18 September 1812 while Coromandel was sailing from Mokha, Yemen. Echo may have been the Echo, of 409 tons (bm), James Shaw, master, 35 crewmen, and ten 6-pounder guns, which had received a letter of marque on 4 February 1807. Echo sent Coromandel to Rio de Janeiro, where her own crew recaptured her the next day. They then sailed Coromondel to Salem, Massachusetts, where they arrived on 18 October.
- Coromandel (1820 ship), was launched on the Thames. Notable voyages include two for the British East India Company, and one transporting convicts to Tasmania. For the first 15 years of her career she primarily sailed to India. Thereafter, she primarily sailed to Australia and New Zealand. She was wrecked in 1856 or broken up in 1857.
- Coromandel (1834 ship) was a sailing ship built at Quebec in 1834. She was the first ship to bring settlers to South Australia after it was proclaimed a colony in 1836 (Coromandel Valley was named for her) and one of the early ships bringing New Zealand Company settlers to Wellington, New Zealand in 1840. She next carried passengers from Sydney to Melbourne, then in January 1841 took livestock and goods from Port Phillip (Melbourne) to Swan River Colony, Western Australia, in early 1841 and thence to Calcutta. She was last listed in Lloyds Register in 1855.
- Coromandel (1843 ship) was a 660 tons burthen (bm) wood ship built at Greenock in 1843 for Campbell. Her Captain was G. Poole and she sailed on the Glasgow- Adelaide service.
- Coromandel (1847 ship) was launched at Peterhead and was lost in the second half of 1856 in the China Sea while sailing from Liverpool to Hong Kong.
- Coromandel (1872 ship), of 1,986 grt (5,620 m^{3}), was an iron, compound steam-engined merchant vessel built by Pile, William & Co., of Sunderland, and owned by J. & J. Wait. She foundered on a voyage to Liverpool after having left Bombay 30 June 1875.
- Coromandel (1875 ship) was an 849-ton barque built at Glasgow in 1875 for John Fairlie. Shaw Savill Co chartered the boat to bring immigrants to New Zealand. She made seven voyages and was then sold in 1884 for use on the intercolonial trade. After being retired she was damaged and sank at the Railway Wharf in Wellington. The ship was refloated after 12 months by Thomas Carmichael and converted to a coal hulk.
- Coromandel (1885 ship), was a 4,016-ton passenger liner built by Caird & Company Ltd, Greenock in 1885 for the Peninsular and Oriental Steam Navigation Company (P&O company) and used on the United Kingdom India route. She served as a transport and hospital ship in the Ashanti War from 1895 to 1896. She was sold and renamed Shah Noor in 1906, and scrapped in 1908.
- Coromandel (1948 ship) was an 8,720-ton general cargo liner built by Barclay Curle & Co Ltd, Whiteinch, Glasgow for the P&O Company and used on the Europe India route until relocating to the Far East. She was sold and renamed Shun Hing in 1969. She was sold and renamed Hop Sing in 1973. She was scrapped 1973.

== Royal Navy ==
- HMS Malabar was a 56-gun fourth rate of the Royal Navy. She had previously been the East Indiaman Cuvera, which the Navy bought in 1804. The Navy converted her to a storeship in 1806. After being renamed HMS Coromandel she became a convict ship and made a trip carrying convicts to New South Wales in 1819. She spent the last 25 years of her career as a receiving ship for convicts in Bermuda before being broken up in 1853.
- Three other Royal Navy vessels have borne the name: HMS Coromandel
