= List of British prison hulks =

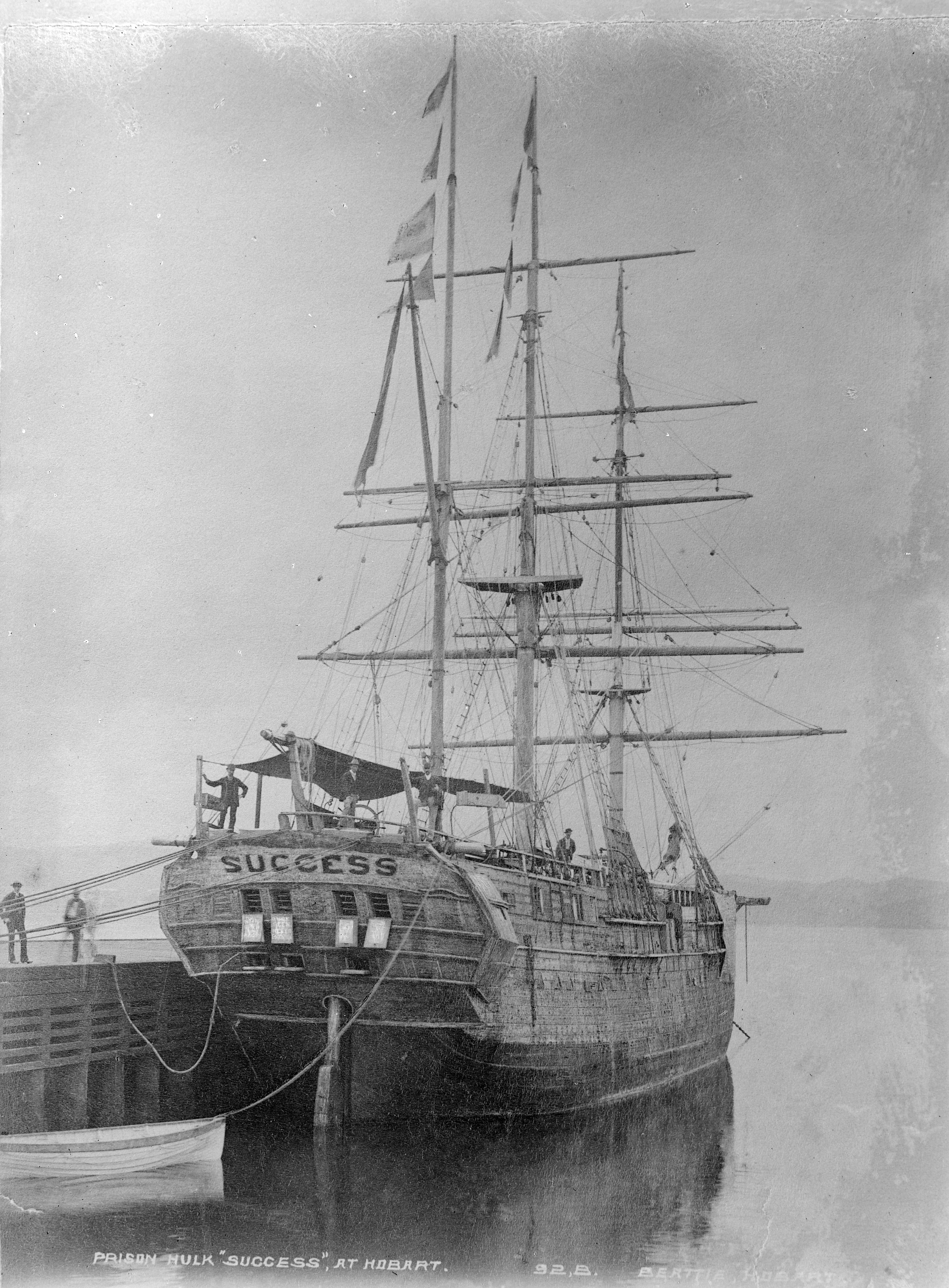
Prison hulk Success at Hobart, Tasmania, Australia

Prison hulks were decommissioned ships that authorities used as floating prisons in the 18th and 19th centuries. They were extensively used in England. The notorious hulks played a crucial role in detaining criminals. The term "prison hulk" is not synonymous with the related term convict ship. A hulk is a ship that is afloat, but incapable of going to sea, whereas convict ships are seaworthy vessels that transport convicted felons from their place of conviction to their place of banishment.

== Initial authorization and later expansion of use ==
Parliament initially intended to use the hulks as a temporary measure and so the first authorization, in the Criminal Law Act 1776 (16 Geo. 3. c. 43), for their use was only for two years. Although some Members of Parliament deplored the hulks the 1776 act lasted for 80 years. Parliament regularly renewed the act and even extended its scope "for the more severe and effectual punishment of atrocious and daring offenders". The American Revolutionary War, the French Revolutionary Wars, and the Napoleonic Wars resulted in the availability of superannuated vessels suitable for conversion to prison hulks. Ships-of-the-line were particularly suitable because of their size; in active service they had accommodation for hundreds of crewmen.

Hulks ceased to be used in Great Britain on the final expiry of the act in 1857.

== Conversion of decommissioned ships ==
Converting the ships to prison hulks involved removal of the rigging, masts, rudders, and various other features required for sailing. Some hulks retained some of these features, but all were rendered inoperable or unseaworthy in some way. The internal structure was also reconfigured with various features, including cells, in order to accommodate convicted criminals or occasionally prisoners of war.

The hulks, which retained only their ability to float, were typically located in harbours. This made them convenient temporary holding quarters for convicts awaiting transportation to Australia and other penal colonies within the British Empire. In 1798 the hulks held more than 1,400 out of about 1,900 people waiting for transportation to Australia. Most British prison hulks were decommissioned in the 19th century, although suspected and convicted criminals are still confined aboard ships on occasion for various reasons.

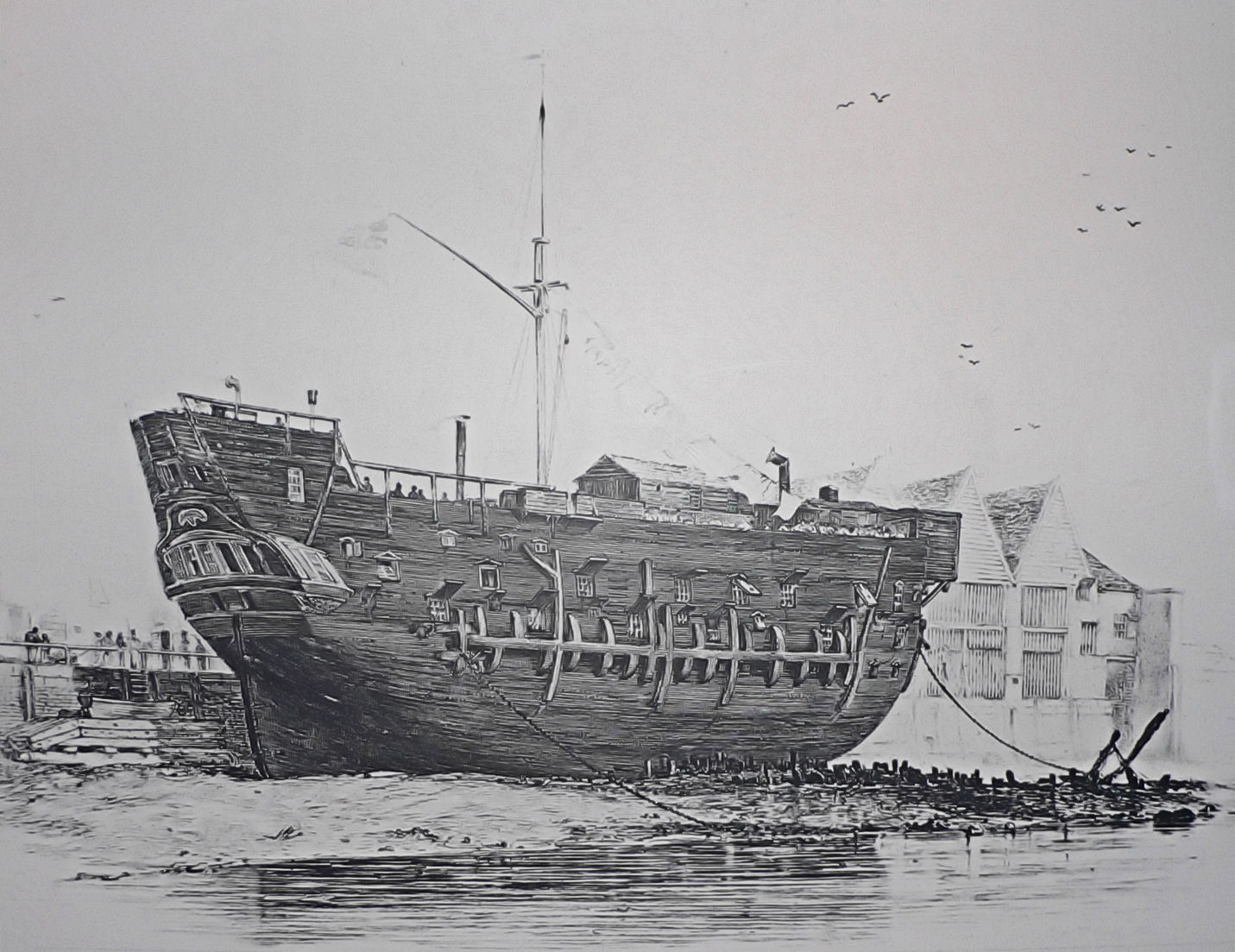
The forbidding form of the beached convict hulk HMS Discovery at Deptford. Launched as a 10-gun sloop at Rotherhithe in 1789, the ship served as a convict hulk from 1818 until scrapped in February 1834.

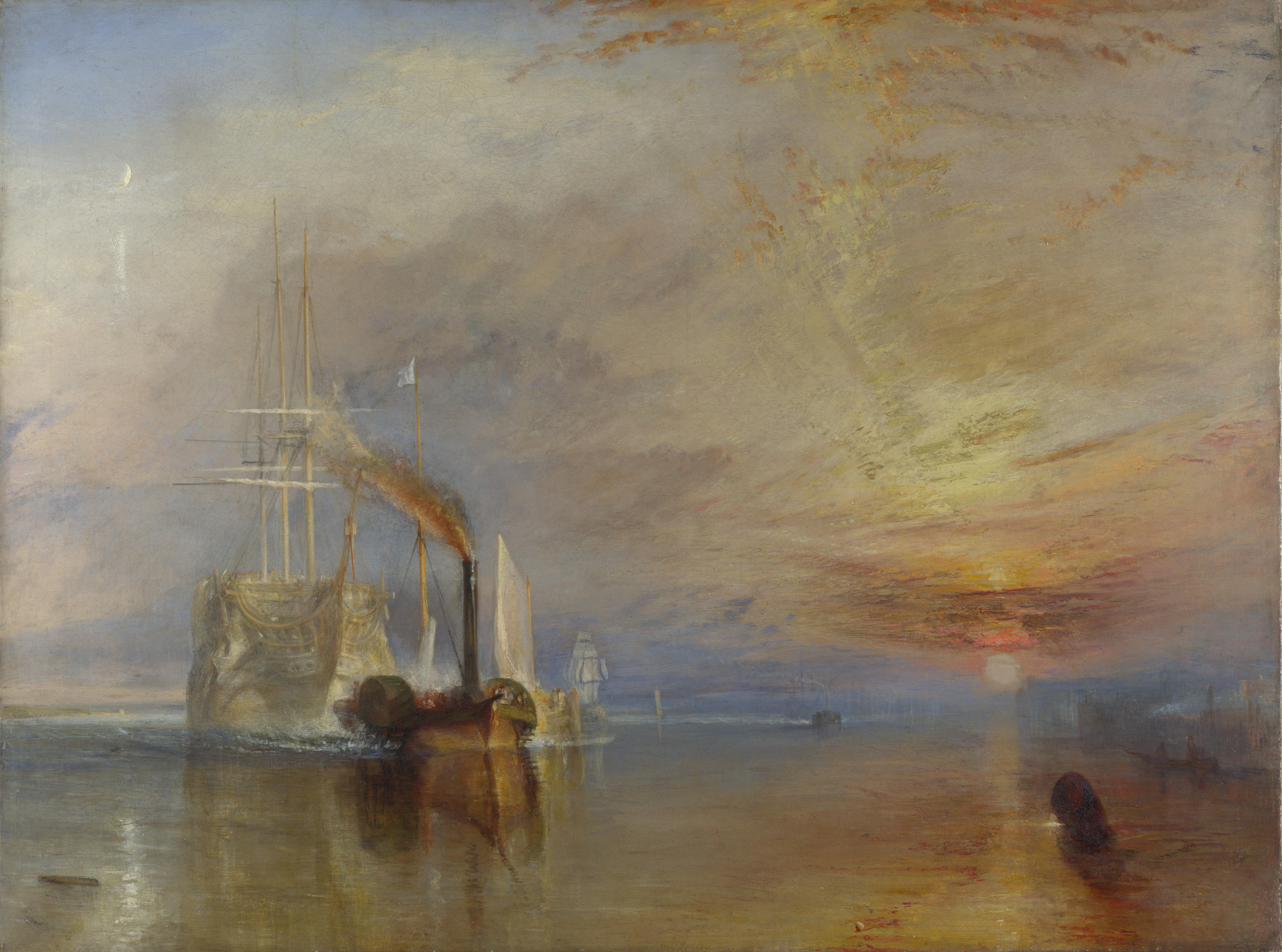
The Fighting Temeraire tugged to her last berth to be broken, J. M. W. Turner, 1838, National Gallery, London

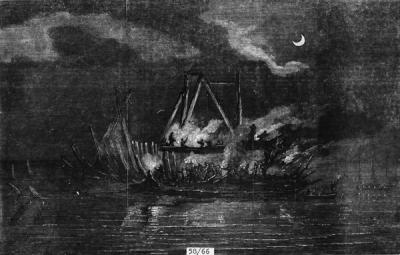
Convicts breaking up the prison hulk York (1807), from the Illustrated London News, c. 1848, National Maritime Museum, Greenwich

Name	Years in service	Location	Comments
HMS Antigua	1804–1816		Antigua was the former French privateer Egyptienne, which Hippomenes captured in 1804.
HMS Antelope	1824–1845	Bermuda	Antelope was a 50-gun Fourth-rate launched in 1802. She was used as a troopship from 1818, was placed on harbour service from 1824 and was broken up in 1845.
HMS Argenta	1919–1925	Belfast Lough Northern Ireland	Argenta was a U.S. cargo ship purchased as a hulk to intern Irish Republicans as part of Britain's 1922 Special Powers Act internment strategy following the events of Bloody Sunday (1920). HMS Argenta was scrapped in 1925.
HMS Bellerophon	1815–1824	Sheerness	Bellerophon was a 74-gun Third-rate launched in 1786. Having taken part in the Battle of Trafalgar, she became a prison hulk in 1815, was renamed Captivity in October 1824 and was sold out of service in January 1836.
HMS Belliqueux	1814–1816		Belliqueux was a 64-gun Third-rate launched in 1780 at Blackwall. She was used as a prison hulk from 1814 and broken up in 1816.
HMS Briton	1841–1856	Portsmouth	Briton was built in 1812, Chatham.
HMS Canada	1810–1834	Chatham	Canada was a 74-gun Third-rate launched in 1765. She became a prison hulk in 1810 and was broken up in 1834.
HMS Captivity	1796–1816	Gosport and Devonport	The first Captivity was a former 64-gun Third-rate launched in 1772 as HMS Monmouth. She became a prison hulk and was renamed Captivity in 1796. She was broken up in 1816.
HMS Captivity	1824–1836	Gosport and Devonport	The second Captivity was a former 74-gun Third-rate launched in 1786 as HMS Bellerophon. She became a prison hulk in 1815 and was renamed HMS Captivity in 1824. She was sold in 1836.
Censor	1776–?	Woolwich	Censor was a former French Navy frigate of 731-tons. With Justitia I and Justitia II, she was one of the first prison hulks, and supplied by ship owner and merchant Duncan Campbell.
HMS Ceres	1787–1797	Woolwich	Ceres was a 32-gun Fifth-rate launched in 1781 and broken up in 1830.
HMS Chatham	1793–1805	Plymouth	Chatham was a 50-gun Fourth-rate launched in 1758. She was used for harbour service from 1793 and was a powder hulk from 1805. She was renamed Tilbury in 1810 and was broken up in 1814.
HMS Coromandel	1827–1853	Bermuda	Coromandel was a 20-gun storeship, formerly an East Indiaman that the Admiralty purchased in 1804, commissioned as a 56-gun Fourth-rate, and named HMS Malabar. She was refitted as a storeship in 1805 and renamed Coromandel in 1815. She became a prison hulk in 1827 and was broken up in 1853.
HMS Crown	1798–1802; 1806–1815	Portsmouth	Crown was a 64-gun third rate ship launched in 1782. She was converted to serve as a prison ship in 1798, used as a powder hulk from 1802 until 1806, and then restored to a prison ship until being put in ordinary in 1815. She was broken up in 1816.
HMS Cumberland	1830–1833	Chatham	Cumberland was a 74-gun Third-rate launched in 1807, Northfleet. She was converted to a prison hulk in 1830 and was renamed Fortitude in 1833. She was put on the sale list in 1870 and was subsequently sold.
HMS Dasher	1832–1838	Woolwich	Dasher was an 18-gun sloop launched in 1797. She became a prison hulk in 1832 and was broken up in 1838.
HMS Defence	1850–1857	Woolwich and Portsmouth	Defence was a 74-gun Third-rate ship of the line, built in 1815 and accidentally burnt in 1857. Wreck broken up in 1857.
HMS Defiance	1813–1817		Defiance was a 74-gun Third-rate launched in 1783 Rotherhithe. She was used as a prison hulk from 1813 and was broken up in 1817.
HMS Discovery	1818–1834	Woolwich and Deptford	Discovery was a 10-gun sloop launched and purchased in 1789. She was commanded by Captain George Vancouver on his voyage of exploration from 1791 to 1795. She was converted to a bomb vessel in 1799, a prison hulk in 1818 and was broken up in 1834 at Deptford.
HMS Dolphin	1824–1830	Chatham	Dolphin was originally launched as an East Indiaman named Admiral Rainier, which the Navy bought and renamed HMS Hindostan. The Admiralty purchased her in 1804 for service as a 50-gun Fourth-rate. She was converted into a 20-gun storeship in 1811. She was renamed again in 1819 as Dolphin, and once more in 1831 as Justitia, when she became a prison hulk. She was finally sold in 1855.
HMS Dromedary	1825–1864	Woolwich and Bermuda	Dromedary was an East Indiaman that the Navy purchased in 1805. First named Howe and then renamed Dromedary in 1808. She was converted to a convict ship in 1819, became a prison hulk at Bermuda in 1825, and was broken up there in August 1864.
HMS Dunkirk	1782–1792	Plymouth	Dunkirk was a Fourth-rate, built in 1754 at Woolwich. Converted to guardship in 1782, at Plymouth. Sold in 1792.
HMS Edgar	1814–1835		Edgar was a 74-gun Third-rate launched in 1779. She was converted to a prison hulk in 1813, renamed Retribution in 1814, and broken up 1835.
HMS Essex	1824–1834	Cork	HMS Essex was originally the USS Essex of the United States Navy, a sailing frigate that participated in the Quasi-War with France, the First Barbary War, and in the War of 1812. The British captured her in 1814 and she then served as HMS Essex until she was sold at public auction in 1837.
HMS Euryalus	1825–1847	Chatham and Gibraltar	Having taken part in the Battle of Trafalgar and briefly served as Admiral Collingwood's flagship, Euryalus was decommissioned in 1825 and converted into a prison hulk for boys at Chatham. In 1847 she was moved to Gibraltar, and was sold for breaking up in 1860.
HMS Fortitude (Formerly HMS Cumberland)	1833–1844	Chatham	HMS Cumberland was a 74-gun Third-rate launched in 1807. She was converted to a prison hulk in 1830 and was renamed Fortitude in 1833. She was put on the sale list in 1870 and was subsequently sold.
HMS Fortitude (1780)	1795–1820	Chatham	Fortitude was a 74-gun Third-rate ship of the line launched in 1780. She served as a prison hulk from 1795 and was broken up in 1820.
HMS Ganymede	1819–1838	Chatham and Woolwich	Ganymede was the French frigate Hébé captured in 1809. She was converted to a prison hulk in 1819 and broken up in 1838.
HMS Gelykheid	1807–1814	Gillingham	Equally Gelijkeidt, Gelykheidt, or Gelikheid. On 8 May 1800 a court martial was held at Sheerness, on board HMS Savage on Lieutenant Wheatly and his Clerk, of the Gelykheid prison ship, at Gillingham, for drunkenness and neglect of duty, ungentlemanlike conduct, embezzlement of stores, tyranny, and oppression, but the charges being malicious and ill founded, they were acquitted. In 1803 was stationed in the Humber as Guardship and in 1807 she was fitted out as sheer hulk at Falmouth. She was disposed of in 1814.
HMS Glory	1809–1814		Glory was a 90-gun Second-rate launched in 1788. She was converted to a prison hulk in 1809, a powder hulk in 1814, was and broken up in 1825.
HMS Goree	1814–1817	Bermuda	Goree was the 16-gun sloop of war HMS Favourite launched in 1794. The French captured her in 1806 and renamed her Favorite; the British recaptured her in 1807 and renamed her HMS Goree. She became a prison hulk in Bermuda in 1814 and was broken up in 1817.
HMS Hardy	1824–1833		Hardy was a 14-gun gun-brig launched in 1804. She was used as a storeship from 1818 and a hospital ship from 1821, before being sold in 1835.
HMS Hebe	1839–1852	Woolwich	Hebe was a 46-gun Fifth-rate launched in 1826, made a receiving ship in 1840, hulked in 1861, and broken up in 1873.
HMS Hector	1808–1816		Hector was a 74-gun Third-rate launched at Deptford in 1774 and converted to a prison hulk in 1808, and broken up in 1816.
HMS Justitia	1812–1830	Sheerness	Vice Ad. Richard Onslow seized the Zeeland from the Dutch at Plymouth on 4 March 1796. She was renamed Justitia in 1812 and broken up in 1830, when her name was transferred to Dolphin.
HMS Justitia	1830–1855	Woolwich	Justitia was originally launched as an East Indiaman named Admiral Rainier. The Admiralty purchased her in 1804 to use as a 50-gun Fourth-rate, and named her HMS Hindostan. She was converted into a 20-gun storeship in 1811. She was renamed again in 1819 as Dolphin, and once more in 1830 as Justitia, when she became a prison hulk. She was finally sold in 1855.
HMS Jersey	1776–1783	New York	Jersey was a 60-gun Fourth-rate, built in 1736 as Plymouth. She was used as a prison hulk in New York during the American Revolutionary War, and subsequently burned by the British before they abandoned New York in 1783.
HMS Laurel	1798–1821	Portsmouth	Laurel was the Dutch sloop Sireene captured at the capitulation of Saldanha Bay in 1796. She was initially named HMS Daphne, but in 1798 was converted to a convict ship under the name of HMS Laurel. She was sold in 1821.
HMS Leven	1827–1848	Woolwich and Deptford	Leven was launched in 1813 at Ipswich. She became a hospital ship in 1827 and then a prison hulk at Chatham. She became a receiving ship at Limehouse in 1842 and was broken up in 1848.
HMS Leviathan	1816–1848	Portsmouth	Leviathan was a 74-gun Third-rate ship of the line launched in 1790 at Chatham. She fought at the Battle of Trafalgar, was used as a prison hulk from 1816. In October 1846 she was used as a naval target, and was sold out of service in 1848.
HMS Lion	1816–1837	Gosport	Lion was a 64-gun Third-rate launched in 1777. She was used as a sheer hulk from 1816 and was sold for breaking up in 1837.
Lord Stanley	1777	Halifax, Nova Scotia	Lord Stanley was a mercantile snow of 150 tons (bm) that a Massachusetts privateer captured and the Royal Navy recaptured. She transported prisoners from the American colonies to Halifax and then remained there as a prison ship.
HMS Medway	1850–1862	Bermuda	Medway was a 74-gun Third-rate launched in 1812. She was used as a prison hulk after 1847 and was sold in 1865.
HMS Menelaus	1832–1897		Menelaus was a Royal Navy 38-gun Fifth-rate frigate, launched in 1810 at Plymouth. In 1820 she moved to Chatham and in 1832 became a quarantine hulk. On 19 December 1848 she accepted sick from the convict ship Hasemey, which called in at Portsmouth en route from the River Thames to New South Wales with a number of cases of cholera and diarrhoea. She remained with the Quarantine Service until 1890 and was sold in 1897.
HMS Narcissus	1823–1837		Narcissus was a 32-gun Fifth-rate launched in 1801 at Deptford. She became a prison hulk after 1823, and was sold in 1837.
HMS Oiseau	1810–1816		Oiseau was a 36-gun Fifth-rate, originally a French ship called Cleopatre but captured in 1793. She was converted to a prison hulk in 1810, later lent to the Transport Board and sold in 1816.
HMS Owen Glendower	1842–1862	Gibraltar	Owen Glendower was launched in 1808 at Humber. She became a prison hulk in Gibraltar 1842, a receiving ship in 1876, and was sold in 1884.
HMS Pegase	1794–1810	Portsmouth	Pégase was a 74-gun ship of the line of the French Navy, captured in 1782. She served as a prison ship from 1794, a prison hospital ship from 1801, returned to being a prison ship in 1803 and was lent to the Transport Board in 1810. In 1811, she was still a Prison Hospital Ship (death on board of POW Pascal FURIC, a French sailor, "phthisis pulmonalis", on 6 May 1811) ref.: TNA ADM 103/357.
HMS Perseus	1813–1824	Greenwich	Perseus was a prison hulk that was probably formerly a 22-gun Royal Navy frigate launched in 1776. She was used as a prison hulk by 1801. She was drawn at her mooring off the Tower of London by J.M.W. Turner in 1824.
Phoenix	1824–1837	Sydney	Phoenix was a merchant sailing vessel damaged upon the Sow and Pigs Reef within Sydney Harbour and converted to a prison hulk.
HMS Portland	1802–1817	Langstone Harbour	Portland was a 50-gun Fourth-rate launched in 1770 at Sheerness. She was converted to a 10-gun storeship in 1800 and a prison hulk in 1802. She was sold in 1817.
HMS Prothee	1795–1815	Portsmouth	Protée was a 64-gun ship of the French Navy, captured in 1780. She served as a prison ship from 1795 until being broken up in 1815.
HMS Prudent	1779–1814	Woolwich	Prudent was launched in 1768 at Woolwich Dockyard. She was on put on harbour service in 1779 and sold in 1814.
HMS Racoon	1819–1838	Portsmouth	Racoon was an 18-gun sloop launched in 1808 at Yarmouth. She was used as a hospital ship for convicts from 1819 and was sold in 1838.
HMS Resolute	1844–1852		Resolute was a 12-gun gun-brig launched in 1805 in Dover. She was used as a tender from 1814, a diving bell vessel from 1816 and a prison hulk from 1844. She was broken up in 1852.
HMS Retribution	1814–1835	Woolwich and Sheerness	Retribution was a prison hulk launched in 1779 as the 74-gun Third-rate HMS Edgar. Edgar was converted into a prison hulk in 1813, renamed Retribution in 1814 and broken up in 1835.
HMS Royalist	1856		Royalist was originally HMS Mary Gordon of six guns, purchased in China in 1841. Became a hulk in 1856.
HMS Savage	1804–1815	Woolwich	Savage was a 14-gun sloop launched in 1778. She became a hulk in 1804 and was sold in 1815.
HMS Stirling Castle	1839–1861	Plymouth Devonport until October 1844 thenPortsmouth	Stirling Castle was a 74-gun Third-rate ship of the line launched in 1811 at Rochester. She became a hulk in 1839 and was broken up in 1861.
HMS Success	1814–1820	Hobart	Success was a 32-gun Fifth-rate launched in 1781 at Liverpool. She became a prison hulk in 1814 and was broken up in 1820.
HMS Sulphur	1843–1857	Woolwich	Sulphur was a 10-gun bomb vessel launched in 1826. She was used as a survey ship from 1835, and for harbor service from 1843. She was broken up in 1857.
HMS Surprise	1822–1837	Cork	Surprise was a 38-gun frigate, previously named HMS Jacobs and launched in 1812. She became a prison hulk in 1822 and was sold in 1837.
HMS Temeraire	1812–1815	River Tamar	Temeraire was a 98-gun Second-rate launched in 1798 at Chatham. She served as a prison hulk between 1812 and 1815, then as a receiving ship until 1836, and was broken up in 1838.
HMS Tenedos	1843–1875	Bermuda	Tenedos was a 38-gun Fifth-rate launched in 1812. She was used as a prison hulk from 1843 and was broken up in 1875.
HMS Thames	1841–1863	Bermuda and Deptford	Thames was a 46 gun Fifth-rate launched in 1823. She was converted to a prison hulk in 1841, and sank at her moorings in 1863.
HMS Unite	1832–1858	Woolwich	Unite was a 40-gun Fifth-rate captured from the French in 1793. She was taken into service as HMS Imperieuse and was renamed Unite in 1803. She was on harbour service from 1832 and was broken up in 1858.
HMS Vengeance	1808–1816	Portsmouth	Vengeance was a 74-gun third rate launched in 1774. She became a prison ship in 1808 and was broken up in 1816.
HMS Warrior	1840–1857	Woolwich	Warrior was a 74-gun Third-rate ship of the line launched in 1781. She became a receiving ship after 1818, a prison hulk after 1840, and was broken up in 1857.
HMS Weymouth	1828–1865	Bermuda	Weymouth was a 36-gun Fifth-rate, previously the East Indiaman Wellesley. She was purchased in 1804, and by 1811 had been converted into a 16-gun storeship. She was used as a prison hulk from 1828 and was sold in 1865.
HMS York	1820–1852	Gosport	York was a 74-gun Third-rate launched in 1807 at Rotherhithe. She was converted to a prison hulk in 1819 and served as a prison hulk at Gosport and London from 1820 until 1848 when a serious rebellion broke out. Typically she confined about 500 convicts. She was taken out of service and broken up in 1854. Hulks were re-banned in England.

== See also ==
- List of ships of the line of the Royal Navy
- Convict ship
- Prison ship
- Prison Ship Martyrs' Monument
- Transport Board
