= HMS Coromandel =

Four ships of the Royal Navy have borne the name HMS Coromandel, after the Coromandel Coast of India:

- HMS Coromandel (1795) was a 56-gun fourth rate, previously the East Indiaman Winterton. She was purchased on the stocks in 1795, used as a storeship from 1800, was converted to a convalescent ship in 1807 for Jamaica, and was sold there in 1813. She returned to Britain around 1847 and was wrecked at Yarmouth in 1856.
- HMS Coromandel was the East Indiaman Cuvera, which the Admiralty bought in 1804 and converted to the 56-gun fourth-rate HMS Malabar. She was rebuilt as a 20-gun storeship in 1806 and renamed HMS Coromandel in 1815. She transported convicts to Australia in 1819. From 1828 to 1853, when she was broken up, she served as a prison hulk in Bermuda.
- HMS Coromandel (1855) was a wooden paddle dispatch vessel of the Royal Navy. She was built in 1853 for the P&O company as the passenger and cargo steamer Tartar. The Navy purchased her in 1855 and she participated in several battles in Chinese waters, including having been sunk and recovered. The Navy sold her in 1866 and she went through several changes in ownership before she was broken up in 1876.
- HMS Coromandel (1856) was a 4-gun wooden screw frigate launched in 1856 and in service until at least 1870.
