= French frigate Minerve (1794) =

1794 Minerve-class frigate

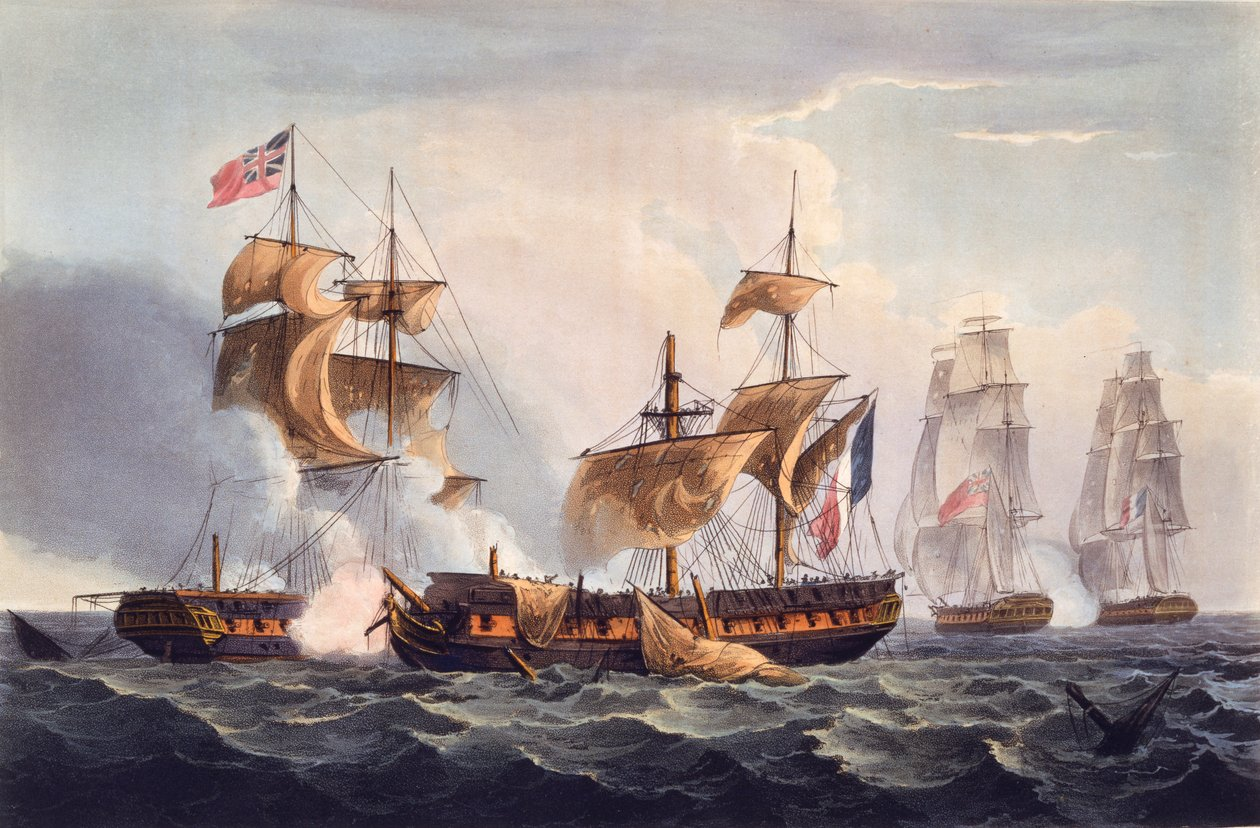
- Minerve heading for the open sea at the mouth of the Tagus in 1797, by Thomas Buttersworth

History

France
- Name: Minerve
- Builder: Toulon
- Laid down: January 1792
- Launched: 5 September 1794
- Captured: 23 June 1795 by the Royal Navy

Great Britain
- Name: Minerve
- Acquired: 23 June 1795
- Captured: 3 July 1803 by the French Navy

France
- Name: Canonnière
- Acquired: 3 July 1803
- Renamed: Canonnière in August 1806; Confiance in June 1809
- Captured: 3 February 1810 by the Royal Navy

United Kingdom
- Name: HMS Confiance
- Acquired: 3 February 1810
- Fate: Struck from navy lists by 1814

General characteristics
- Class & type: Minerve-class frigate
- Displacement: 1450 tonneaux
- Tons burthen: 700 port tonneaux; 1,10179/94 (bm)
- Length: 48.4 m (158 ft 10 in)
- Beam: 12.2 m (40 ft 0 in)
- Draught: 5.6 m (18 ft 4 in)
- Armament: As built: 28 × 18-pounder guns + 12 × 8-pounder guns; Later:28 × 18-pounder guns + 16 × 32-pounder carronades + 6 × 6-pounder guns

Minerve was a 40-gun Minerve-class frigate of the French Navy. The British captured her twice and the French recaptured her once. She therefore served under four names before being broken up in 1814:

- Minerve, 1794–1795
- HMS Minerve, 1795–1803
- Canonnière, 1803–1810
- HMS Confiance, 1810–1814

== French service as Minerve ==
Her keel was laid in January 1792, and Minerve was launched in 1794. On 14 December, off the island of Ivica, she captured the collier Hannibal, which was sailing from Liverpool to Naples. However, eleven days later, HMS Tartar recaptured Hannibal off Toulon and sent her into Corsica. Minerve took part in combat off Noli. At the action of 24 June 1795, she and the 36-gun Artémise engaged the frigates HMS Dido and HMS Lowestoffe. Minerve surrendered to the British, Artémise having fled, and was commissioned in the Royal Navy as HMS Minerve.

== British service as HMS Minerve ==
=== French Revolutionary Wars ===
On 19 December 1796, Minerve, under the command of Captain George Cockburn, was involved in an action with HMS Blanche against the Spanish frigates Santa Sabina and Ceres. Minerve captured the Santa Sabina, which lost 164 men killed and wounded. Minerve herself lost eight killed, 38 wounded and four missing. Minerve also suffered extensive damage to her masts and rigging. Blanche went off in pursuit of Ceres. Early the next morning a Spanish frigate approached Minerve, which made ready to engage. However, two Spanish ships of the line and two more frigates approached. Skillful sailing enabled Cockburn to escape with Minerve but the Spaniards recaptured Santa Sabina and her prize crew.

On the evening of 1 August 1799, at 9 P.M., Minerve's boats came alongside Peterel. Captain Francis Austen of Peterel sent these boats and his own to cut out some vessels from the Bay of Diano, near Genoa. Firing was heard at around midnight and by morning the boats returned, bringing with them a large settee carrying wine, and the Virginie, a French warship. Virginie was a Turkish-built half-galley that the French had captured at Malta the year before. She had provision for 26 oars and carried six guns. She was under the command of a lieutenant de vaisseau and had a crew of 36 men, 20 of whom had jumped overboard when the British approached, and 16 of whom the British captured. She had brought General Joubert from Toulon and was going on the next day to Genoa where Joubert was to replace General Moreau in command of the French army in Italy. Minerve and Peterel shared the proceeds of the capture of Virginie with Santa Teresa and Vincejo.

Then on 8 November, Minerve and the hired armed brig Louisa captured Mouche.

On 15 May 1800, Minerve and the schooner Netley captured the French privateer cutter Vengeance. Vengeance was armed with 15 guns and had a crew of 132 men.

In September 1801 Minerve was in the Mediterranean protecting Elba. Early on 2 September Minerve alerted Phoenix, which was anchored off Piombino, to the presence of two French frigates nearby. Phoenix and Minerve set out in pursuit and Pomone soon came up and joined them. Pomone re-captured Success, a former British 32-gun fifth-rate frigate now under the command of Monsieur Britel. (The French had captured Success in February, off Toulon.) Minerve also ran onshore the 46-gun French frigate Bravoure, which had a crew of 283 men under the command of Monsieur Dordelin. Bravoure lost her masts and was totally wrecked; she struck without a shot being fired. Minerve took off a number of prisoners, including Dordelin and his officers, in her boats. With enemy fire from the shore and with night coming on, Captain Cockburn of Minerve decided to halt the evacuation of prisoners; he therefore was unwilling to set Bravoure on fire because some of her crew remained on board.

=== Napoleonic Wars ===
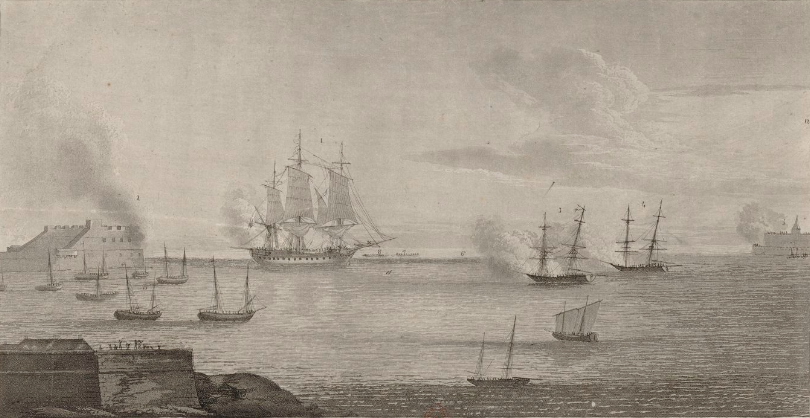
Capture of HMS Minerve by Chiffonne and Terrible.

Shortly after war with France had resumed Minerve was in the Channel and under the command of Captain Jahleel Brenton. On 26 May 1803, she detained the French Navy corvette Naturaliste and brought her into Portsmouth. The British soon released Naturaliste, which arrived at Le Havre on 6 June.

In the evening of 2 July, during a fog, Minerve ran aground near Cherbourg. She had been pursuing some merchant vessels when she hit. The guns of Île Pelée and the gunboats Chiffonne (Captain Lécolier) and Terrible Captain Pétrée immediately engaged her. Minerve's crew attempted to refloat her, but the fire forced Brenton to surrender at 5:30 in the morning, after she had lost 12 men killed and about 15 men wounded.

Brenton attributed his defeat to fire from Fort Liberté at Île Pelée, although the artillery of the fort comprised only three pieces (its other guns had been moved to the fort on the Îles Saint-Marcouf), fired at extreme range, and had ceased fire during the night; on the other hand, the gunboats fired continuously at half-range. The French took Minerve back into their service under the name Canonnière.

== French service as Canonnière ==
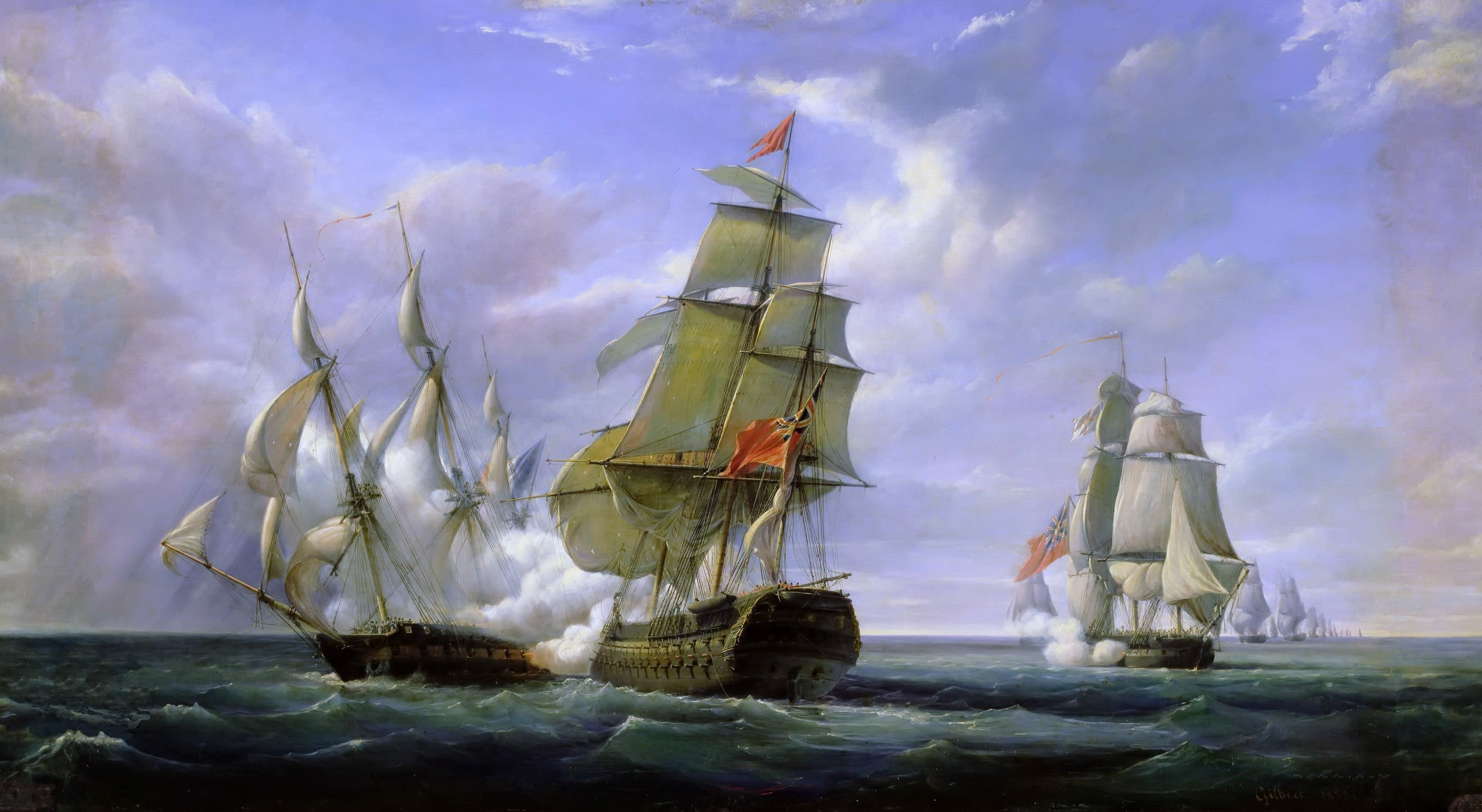
The Action of 21 April 1806 as depicted by Pierre-Julien Gilbert. In the foreground, HMS Tremendous aborts her attempt at raking Canonnière under the threat of being outmanoeuvred and raked herself by her more agile opponent. In the background, the Indiaman Charlton fires her parting broadside at Canonnière. In fact, several hours separated the two events.

In 1806, under Captain César-Joseph Bourayne, she sailed to Isle de France (now Mauritius) to reinforce the frigate squadron under admiral Linois. Failing to find Linois at Isle de France, Canonnière patrolled the Indian Ocean in the hope of making her junction. She fought an inconclusive action on 21 April against the 74-gun HMS Tremendous and the 50-gun HMS Hindostan.

In late 1806, Canonnière was in Manilla, where Bourayne agreed to sail to Acapulco to claim funds on behalf of the Spanish colonies. She arrived at Acapulco in April 1807 and escorted Spanish merchantmen to Luzon. She then returned to Acapulco on 20 July to load three million piastres, ferried them to Manilla, and was back in Isle de France in July 1808.

At that time, the French division of Isle de France, comprising the frigates Manche and Caroline as well as the corvette Iéna, was at sea to conduct commerce raiding. The island was blockaded by the 30-gun HMS Laurel, under Captain John Woolcombe. On 11 September, Canonnière set sail to meet Laurel and force her to retreat or fight. After a day of searching, Canonnière found Laurel and the frigates began exchanging fire around 17:00. Laurel sustained heavy damage to her rigging, hindering her ability to manoeuvers and at 19:00, a gust of wind gave advantage to Canonnière. Laurel struck her colours shortly before 20:00, and Canonnière took her prize in tow back to Port Louis. Her capture strengthened the situation of the island, as Laurel was freshly arrived, provisioned for a five-month cruise, and carried various supplies for the British squadron.

Canonnière returned to Mauritius in late March 1809 . As she required repairs beyond those possible in Mauritius, the French sold her in June and she eventually sent off for France en flûte under the name Confiance.

== Capture and British service as HMS Confiance ==
It was during this transit that HMS Valiant, under Captain John Bligh, recaptured her on 3 February 1810 near Belle Île after a six-hour chase. She was armed with only 14 guns and had a crew of 135 men, under the command of Captain Jacques François Perroud. She had been 93 days in transit when she was captured, having eluded British vessels 14 times. She was carrying goods worth £150,000, General Decaen having made her available to the merchants of Île de France to carry home their merchandise. Amongst her passengers was César-Joseph Bourayne.

Confiance then briefly re-entered the Royal Navy as HMS Confiance. She never returned to active service however, and was deleted from navy lists in 1814.
