= HMS Howe (1805) =

British sailing ship

History

Great Britain
- Name: Kaikusroo
- Builder: Bombay
- Launched: 1799
- Fate: Sold to the Royal Navy in 1805

United Kingdom
- Name: HMS Howe
- Acquired: 1805
- Renamed: Dromedary, 1806
- Fate: Sold out of service 1864

General characteristics
- Class & type: Storeship or convict ship
- Tons burthen: 1045, or 104816/94(bm)
- Length: 150 ft (45.7 m) (overall); 124 ft 3 7/8 in (37.9 m) (keel)
- Beam: 39 ft 9 3/4 in (12.1 m)
- Depth of hold: 16 ft 11 3/4 in (5.2 m)
- Propulsion: Sails
- Sail plan: Full-rigged ship
- Armament: As storeship; Upper deck: 20 × 9-pounder guns; QD: 4 × 6-pounder guns

HMS Howe was originally the teak-built Indian mercantile vessel Kaikusroo that Admiral Edward Pellew bought in 1805 to serve as a 40-gun frigate. In 1806 the Admiralty fitted her out as a 24-gun storeship and renamed her HMS Dromedary. She made numerous trips, including one notable one to Australia when she brought out Lachlan Macquarie and his family to replace William Bligh as governor of New South Wales. Later, she became a prison hulk in Bermuda. Her most recent contribution, however, is as the source of a rich archaeological site.

== East India Company service ==
Built in 1799 in Bombay, Kaikusroo was a so-called Bombay "country ship". As such she engaged in trading voyages on the Malabar Coast and to the Malacca Straits. (Note: Her name is also given as Sha(w) Kai Kusseroo, Shah Kai Kusroo, Shaw Kai Kuperoo, Shah Kaikisroo, or Kaikusroo. Parkinson gives her name as Shah Kaikuseroo. Bulley gives her name variously as Shaw Kai Kusroo, Kaikusroo and Shah Kaikusroo.)

Between 1801 and 1802 she served under charter from the East India Company to the British Government as a transport ship in the British military expedition from India to Egypt and the Red Sea. Captain Thomas Hardie was appointed commodore of the fleet of country ships.

During the period of the charter her owner was the Parsi shipbuilder Sorabjee Mucherjee. His guarantor was the Bombay merchant Charles Forbes, who served also as Kaikusroo's agent); her captain was Colin Mackenzie. At the time of her charter, Kaikusroo was valued at Rupees 275,000.

== Royal Navy service ==
Admiral Pellew purchased Kaikusroo from Sorabjee Mucherjee in Bombay in April 1805 for £43,000. His aim was to use her as a 40-gun frigate. Pellew commissioned her as the Howe under Lieutenant Edward Ratsey (acting). Captain George Cockburn replaced Ratsey and she sailed from India in May with Marquis Wellesley, the departing Governor-General of India, and his suite embarked. Howe and Wellesley, coincidentally, stopped at Saint Helena and stayed in the same building to which Napoleon I of France would later be exiled. Howe arrived at Portsmouth on 7 January 1806. She then moved to the Downs en route to Woolwich Dockyard. She was paid off in February.

There, on 24 February, the Admiralty ordered her converted into a storeship of 24 guns. By March 1806 Howe was embarking stores and she sailed from Portsmouth 14 May under Captain Edward Killwick for the Cape of Good Hope. While she was away the Admiralty recommissioned her on 6 August 1806 and renamed her Dromedary. (Note: In January 1806 the Admiralty had commissioned the construction of a new 100-gun First Rate. This would be HMS Howe. The Admiralty may have ordered the name change on Howe/Dromedary when it assigned the name Howe to the new vessel.) However, the order to rename her Dromedary seems to have taken a long while to take full effect. (Note: In September 1806 William Marsden (Secretary to the Admiralty) was referring to the stores shipped out in the Dromedary. There is a report to the Admiralty, dated 19 November 1806, from Mr Howitson, the Naval Storekeeper at the Cape of Good Hope, in which he states that "… the Howe Storeship, now called the Dromedary, is ordered to proceed to Buenos Aires." However, Steel’s Navy List of December 1806 still lists her as the Howe storeship. Furthermore, when she returned to England in July 1807, local newspapers report the arrival of Howe at Portsmouth 28 July - "from the Plate", and in the Downs in August - "from Montevideo". Thereafter the name Howe disappears and she finally becomes Dromedary - almost a year after the order to change the name.)

She was ordered to sail from the Cape of Good Hope to Buenos Aires where she met up with Sir Home Popham's forces on 28 September. On 3 February 1807 took part in the Battle of Montevideo where she had four men lightly wounded.

Howe, under Captain Killwick, returned to Great Britain in August 1807. She brought with her the prize Diana. Diana had been built in Boston and sold to a Spanish merchant in Monte Video who had planned to use her as a privateer against the British. Diana was carrying hides, copper, tallow, Peruvian bark, furs, horns, ostrich feathers, Vigonia wool, Spanish wool, ebony, goat skins, deer skins, etc. The newspaper report valued the vessel and cargo at £40,000.

At some point William Scott took command of Dromedary. Dromedary then embarked on a number of cruises, taking naval stores wherever the Admiralty sent her. In April 1808 Commander Henry Bouchier was her captain, in the West Indies. She was recommissioned in November under Lieutenant Hayes O'Grady.

=== Bringing a Governor to New South Wales ===
In 1809 Dromedary, under the command of its master, Samuel Pritchard, carried Lachlan and Elizabeth Macquarie to New South Wales. Macquarie was to take over as governor from William Bligh. To enforce the change should the New South Wales Corps oppose it, Macquarie brought with him the 1st Battalion of the 73rd Regiment of Foot, his own regiment.

When the Macquaries boarded Dromedary, lying off the Isle of Wight on 19 May 1809, they found the vessel critically overcrowded, with insufficient provisions for the voyage, and conditions so cramped that additional wooden berths or cradles had been erected to try to accommodate all the passengers. On board, in addition to the crew of 102 sailors, there were 15 officers, 451 rank and file, 90 women and 87 children. Pritchard took with him his wife, two-year-old son, and their servant "Black Tom".

Macquarie immediately transferred 39 men from Dromedary to Hindostan. Hindostan was a former East Indiaman now in service with the Royal Navy as a transport. She would accompany Dromedary on the trip while also carrying troops. Macquarie sent ashore two officers, 50 privates and 41 women and children who were instructed to follow in the next available convict transport. The Dromedary sailed on 22 May.

On 29 May, while Dromedary was in company with Hindostan, Hindostan recaptured the Swedish ship Gustavus.

Dromedary arrived at Port Jackson on 28 December 1809. Macquarie assumed the governorship on New Year's Day, 1810. At 5 pm on 7 March 1810 a fire was discovered to have broken out on Dromedary's lower tier; it was finally extinguished by midnight. In May Dromedary and Hindostan sailed for Britain. They took with them some 22 officers and 345 men of the New South Wales Corps, renamed to the 102nd Regiment of Foot, as well as 105 women and 98 children. On the voyage, Colonel William Paterson, the former Lieutenant Governor of New South Wales, died off Cape Horn. Dromedary arrived at Spithead on 25 October.

== Storeship ==
Dromedary returned home in 1811. S P Pritchard was still her master from 1811 to 1812. His replacement, in 1814, was Edward Ives. She then sailed to the West Indies. Ives remained her master in 1815.

== Convict ship ==
In 1819 Dromedary and Coromandel were fitted out as convict transports. On 12 September under Captain Richard Skinner Dromedary sailed for Australia with 370 convicts.

After delivering the convicts she was to proceed to New Zealand and Norfolk Island to procure timber for the home Dockyards. She arrived in Van Diemen's Land on 10 January 1820, after a voyage of 121 days. She landed 347 convicts at Hobart, and another 22 at Sydney. She also carried a detachment of the 84th Regiment of Foot, and some passengers. At Sydney both Dromedary and Coromandel were fitted out to carry lumber. They then went their separate ways, Dromedary to Whangaroa and Coromandel to the river Thames (Waihou). Among the passengers aboard was Commissioner John Bigge.

From 20 February to 25 November Dromedary was in New Zealand collecting wood for the Navy to see if it would be useful for spars. It would take almost a year to complete loading. Dromedary unloaded her timber at Chatham in June 1821.

On Dromedary's return to England she was refitted at Woolwich 1822-23 and then in 1825, with Richard Skinner as Master, she sailed for Bermuda with 100 convicts. She arrived in 1826 where the convicts were put to hard labor building the Dockyard.

== Prison hulk ==
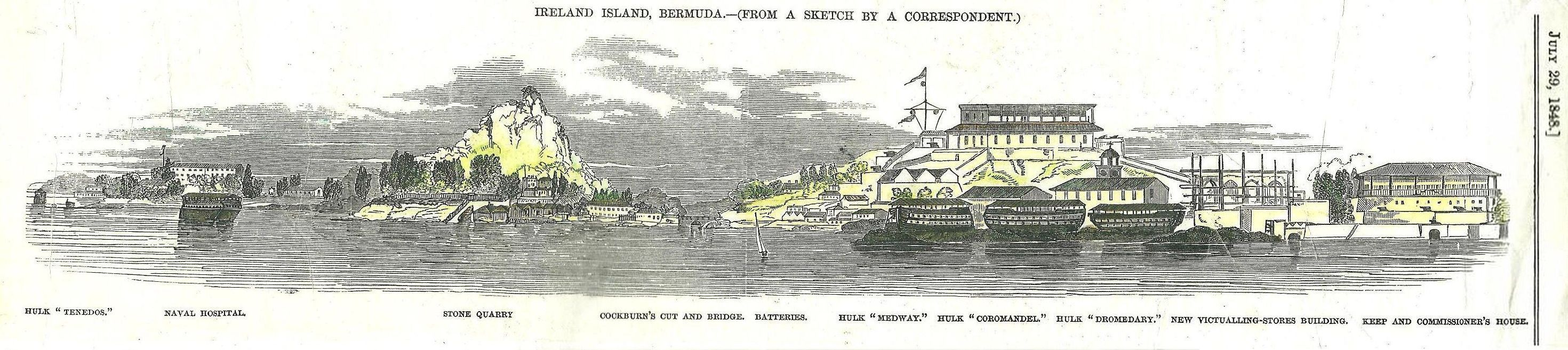
1848 Woodcut of HMD Bermuda, Ireland Island, Bermuda showing prison hulks.

In 1826 Dromedary became a prison hulk for 400 newly arriving convicts. In May 1830 her master was J. Hayes, on the Africa station. His replacement, in 1834, was R. Skinner, in North America and the West Indies. At some point she returned to Bermuda, for good. She then spent her remaining years at one spot close to the quarries and construction sites where the convicts labored. In 1851, after the convicts had built a bridge to Bows Island and a new barracks there, 600 convicts moved from the hulks Coromandel and Dromedary to the island. For the next 12 years Dromedary served as a kitchen for the working prisoners and those who guarded them. Convicts accommodated on her included John Mitchel.

== Fate ==
Dromedary was sold for breaking up in August 1864.

== Postscript ==
Dromedary sat at the same spot for several decades with the result that where she lay became a midden. In 1982 the Bermudian government gave permission for divers to conduct an underwater archaeological dig at the Dromedary anchorage site.

The dig recovered a large collection of 19th-century material directly associated with convict life on the hulks. The archaeologists recovered thousands of artifacts: whale oil lamps, pewter mugs, engraved spoons, clay pipes, bottles, buttons, seals, coins, trinkets, charms, rings, beads, gaming pieces, religious items, knife handles and gaming boards. Plotting the location of the artifacts enabled archaeologists to link items either to the guards or to the convicts. Clearly, the hulks housed an economy in which convicts carved bone, shell, metal and stone to produce items that they sold to guards, visiting sailors and settlers for tobacco, alcohol, food and money.

== In popular culture ==
HMS Dromedary, described as a "slab-sided transport," appears in Patrick O'Brian's 1983 Napoleonic naval adventure novel Treason's Harbour.
