= César-Joseph Bourayne =

French Navy officer

César-Joseph de Bourayne
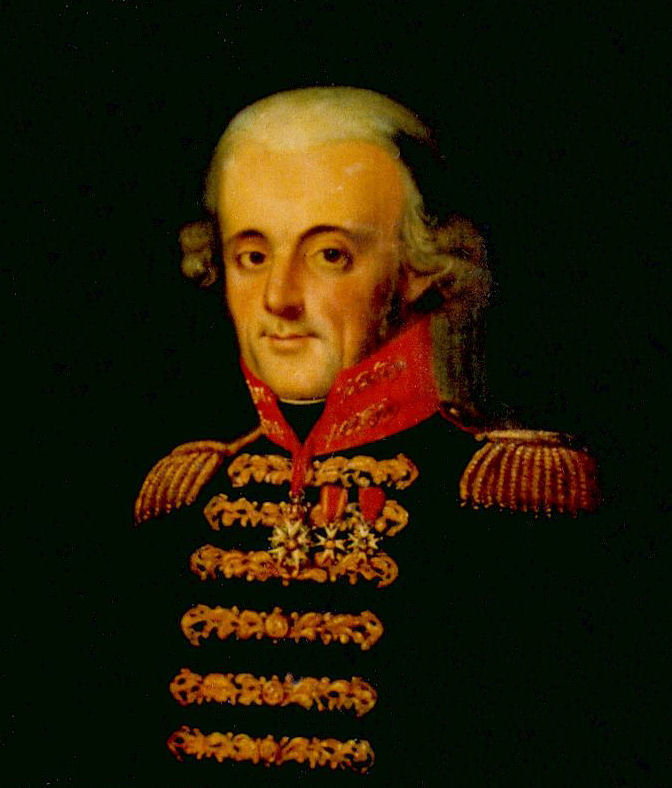
- Born: 22 February 1768; Brest, France
- Died: 5 November 1817 (aged 49); Brest, France
- Military career
- Allegiance: Kingdom of France; Kingdom of France; First French Republic; French First Empire
- Branch: French Navy
- Service years: 1781–1814
- Rank: Counter-Admiral
- Conflicts: American Revolutionary War; Battle of Fort Royal; Battle of the Chesapeake; Siege of Yorktown; Battle of Saint Kitts; Battle of the Saintes; War of the First Coalition; Action of 7 May 1794; War of the Third Coalition; Action of 21 April 1806

Counter-Admiral César-Joseph de Bourayne (22 February 1768 – 5 November 1817) was a French Navy officer who served in the American Revolutionary War and the French Revolutionary and Napoleonic Wars. He was appointed counter admiral in 1815, having been made a Baron of the Empire in 1811. A street in Brest, France was named after him, as was a bay and port of the island of Huahine in French Polynesia.

== Career ==
=== Origins and youth ===
Born in Brest on 22 February 1768, Caesar Bourayne was the 5th child of a family of 13, including two naval officers and two navy commissioners, which earned their mother the nickname "the mother to the seamen”. In 1781, at 13 years old, he embarked on the 80-gun ship of the line Auguste, commanded by Louis Antoine de Bougainville. Auguste was part of the fleet of the Comte de Grasse, which operated in the Atlantic against the Royal Navy during the American Revolutionary War. He participated in the various actions of this campaign including the victory at the Battle of the Chesapeake and the defeat at the Battle of the Saintes. In the 10 years that followed, he continued his training in many engagements in the Caribbean, Africa, Red Sea, Indian Ocean and Southeast Asia.

=== Early career as an officer ===
In 1791, Bourayne was commissioned as an officer and served aboard the 38-gun frigate Venus during the scientific expedition of Rosily. In August 1792 he was commissioned as an officer serving on the frigate Méduse.

By 1793 he had been promoted to lieutenant and served under Charles Linois on the 36-gun frigate Atalante. On 7 May 1794, while hunting for British merchantmen off the coast of Ireland, Atalante and accompanying corvette Levrette came across a convoy protected by two British ships of the line, Swiftsure and St Albans. The British warships moved to intercept, and though Levrette escaped, Atalante was captured after a 48-hour chase. Bourayne was wounded in the action of 7 May 1794 and taken prisoner. He was paroled in the Bantry Bay area for 19 months before he was returned to France in October 1795.

Borayne went on to serve under Louis Thomas Villaret de Joyeuse in the Irish Sea and Caribbean. In 1800 Bourayne was promoted to Capitaine de frégate, and appointed first officer on Redoutable, and later on Républicain, before commanding the frigate Fidèle from June of that year. On 18 July 1803 he received his promotion to ship-of-the-line captain, on taking command of the recently recaptured 40-gun frigate Minerve, which was now renamed Canonnière.

=== As captain ===
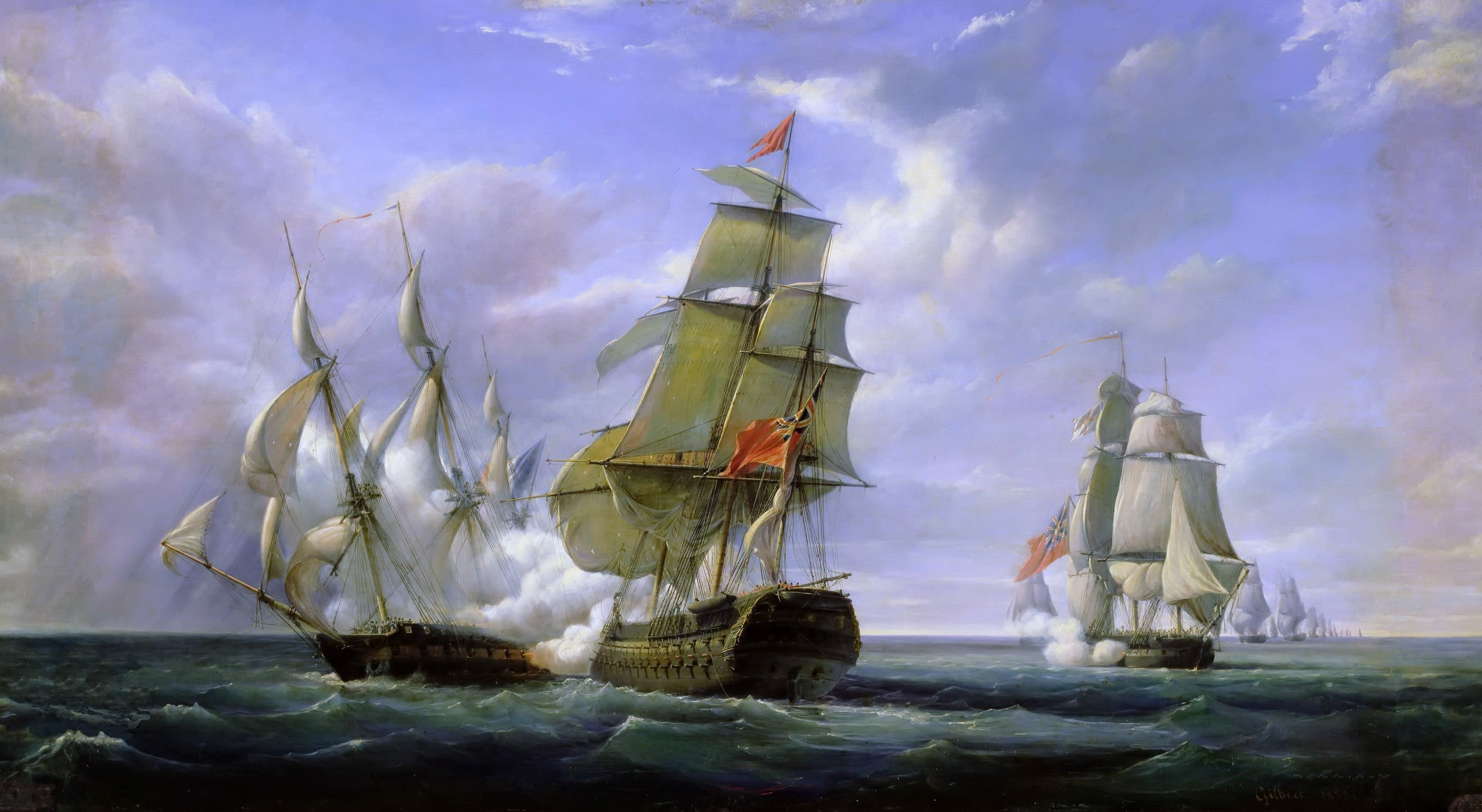
The action of 21 April 1806

On 14 November 1805, Canonnière sailed from Cherbourg to reinforce Linois at Isle de France in the Indian Ocean. When Linois was not to be found there, Bourayne sailed in search of him off the Cape of Good Hope. It was here that he fell in with a fleet of British East Indiamen, resulting in the action of 21 April 1806.

After effecting as much repairs as possible at sea, Bourayne steered for Simon's Town in the Dutch Cape Colony. Unknown to him however, it had recently been captured by the British. In a ruse de guerre, the British forts and ships at the bay flew Batavian colours, and so Bourayne sent a boat to shore. At this point the forts raised British colours and began to bombard the frigate. Canonnière escaped to sea, escaping major damage, but the lieutenant and men aboard the boat were taken prisoner.

Bourayne then set off for Manila, where he could properly repair his ship. He was asked there by Mariano Fernández de Folgueras, the Governor-General of the Philippines, to fetch a large sum of money from Acapulco, across the Pacific Ocean in the Viceroyalty of New Spain. This mission was carried out over a six-month round trip, and he continued to operate in the Pacific until making a return to Isle de France in 1808.

In September 1808, the British 22-gun post-ship Laurel arrived off Isle de France, and soon after recaptured a Portuguese ship which had been taken as a prize by the French. Under a flag of truce, the captain of Laurel requested a boat to be sent out from Port Louis to retrieve French women captured on board the Portuguese prize. On board the boat went an officer of Canonnière, to reconnoitre the capabilities of Laurel. Bourayne was satisfied she was no match for Canonniere, and so set out to capture her. This he did, after a notably spirited defence from Laurel.

Bourayne continued to cruise the Indian Ocean, capturing Discovery, before returning to Isle de France in 1809. Canonnière was found there to be now in such a state of disrepair that she was renamed Confiance and sent back to France as an armed merchantman, with Bourayne aboard as a passenger. Very near to her destination however, she was spotted and taken by the 74-gun Valiant, and so Bourayne found himself a captive for the second time.

=== Later years ===
On 2 May 1811, while still in captivity, Napoleon awarded him the title of Baron of the Empire. In spring 1814, he was finally released and returned to France. He was now 46, and his sailing career was over – however he was further promoted to counter admiral in 1815, and made prefect of Brest during the Hundred Days. He died on 5 November 1817 in Brest at the age of 49.

== Notes and references ==
=== Bibliography ===
- Levot, Prosper (1866). Les gloires maritimes de la France: notices biographiques sur les plus célèbres marins (in French). Bertrand.
