= HMS Ganymede =

British prison ship

HMS Ganymede was a British prison hulk which was moored in Chatham Harbour in Kent, England. HMS Ganymede was the former French 450 ton frigate Hébé (20 guns, pierced for 34), which, under command of Lieutenant Bretonneuire, was captured by the British frigate Loire on 6 February 1809 while en route from Bordeaux to San Domingo, carrying 600 barrels of flour.

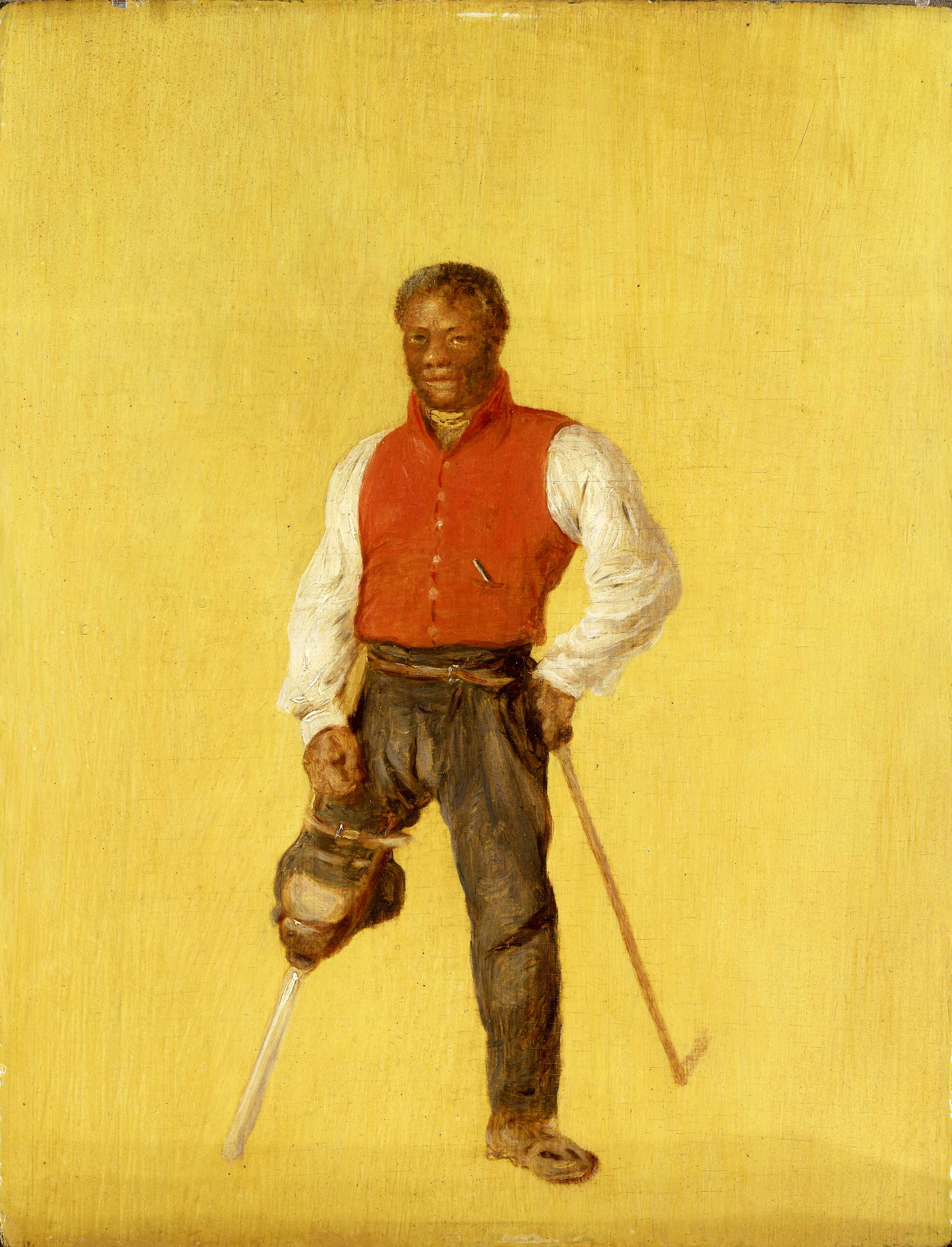
Billy Waters, a member of the crew who lost his right leg as a result of falling from the topsail yard, unable to work he became a famous London street entertainer and was elected ‘king of the beggars’ shortly before his death in 1823

A chart of the Mediterranean with the tracks of Ganymede while bearing the flag of the Rear Admiral Penrose, 2 January to 15 March 1818

Renamed Ganymede, she served with the Royal Navy before being decommissioned. She was converted to a prison hulk in 1819 and later broken up in 1838.

== See also ==
List of British prison hulks
