= Coromandel, KGF =

Coromandel
- Coromandel
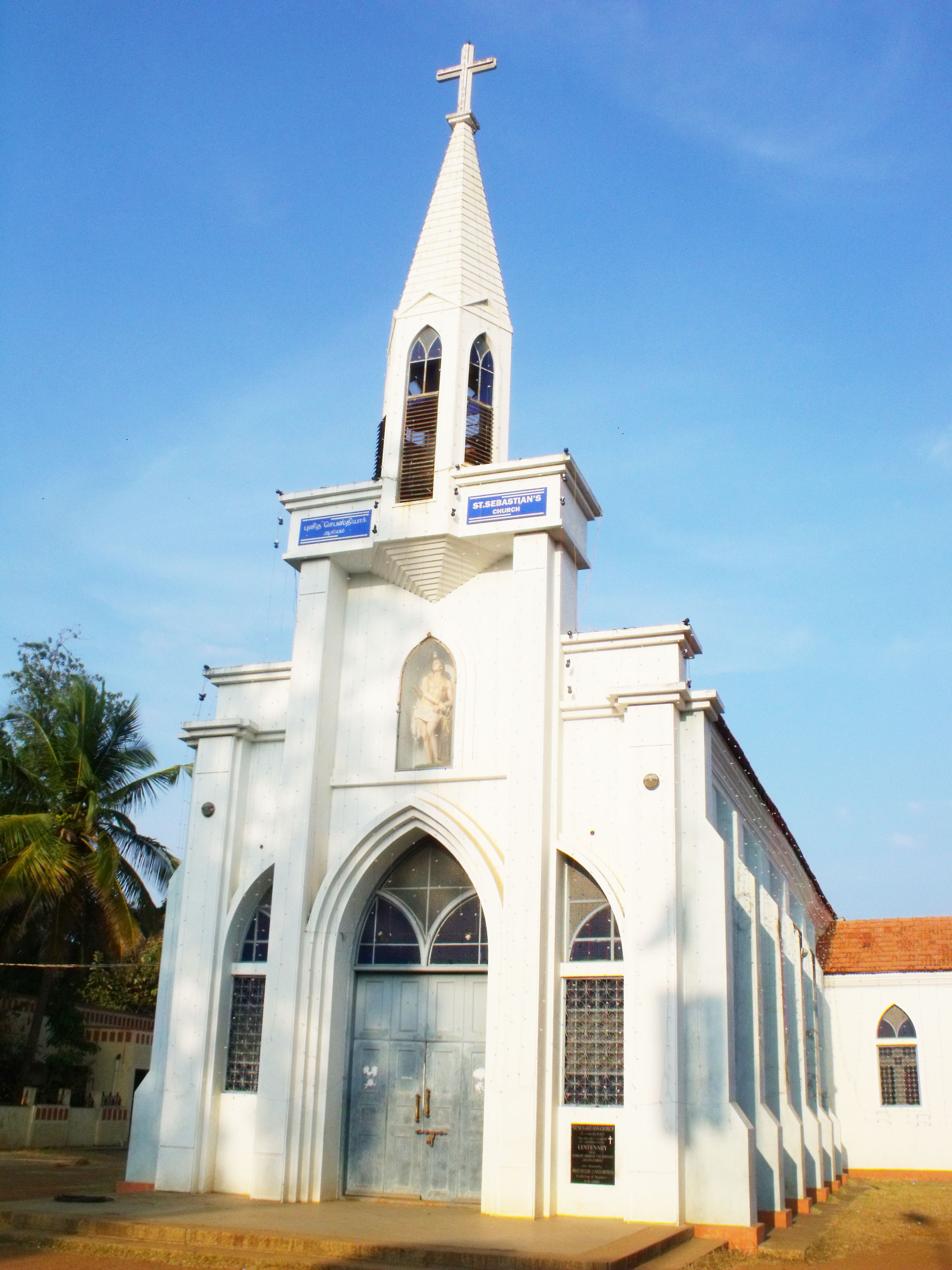
- St Sebastian Church Coromandel KGF

- Location in Karnataka, India
- Coordinates: 12.961736°N 78.270721°E
- Country: India
- State: Karnataka
- District: Kolar district

Languages
  - Official spoken: Kannada, Tamil, Telugu
- PIN: 563118
- Nearest city: Bangalore, Kolar
- Vidhan Sabha constituency: K.G.F
- wards: 04

Coromandel is a mining area in Kolar Gold Fields (KGF), Karnataka, India. Where major mining units are located.

== History ==
Before the arrival of British this land was vast plains with ups and downs. The people were in a few numbers in this semi-arid landscape, British later took rights from the Maharaja of Mysore and started mining in small scale and later they imported machinery and equipment from London. Mining started in massive production of gold in the depths of gold pits.

== Population ==
The majority of people came from Tamil Nadu. The British brought them here to work in the gold mine around the 1860s, because near by villagers refused to work in depth of gold pits and only few Telugu speaking people came from Chittor, Kuppam which is near to Kolar Gold Fields.

== Mining shaft ==
During the British rule Coromandel is the major part in exaction of gold. In the early 1990s there were around 10 to 12 shafts. Some of the major shafts are. Golconda shaft new &old, Balaghat shaft, Henry's shaft, Road block, commercial shaft. After the end of British rule some of the shafts were abandoned, BGML is undertaken by Government of India. In the early 1900s they was only huts, between 1940 and 1950's they build the concrete houses all over the coromandel. It was the time of a golden era, they paid good salary at time. The cost of living is very high compared to the nearby villagers, only the mining area as power supply with street lights, they were no power around of Kolar gold fields. It's believed once that the light source from the Kolar gold fields is seen from kolar during the night. In the 2000s the government of India announced to close BGML due to the exhaust of gold deposit. It was the time of sorrow many worker lost they jobs, without any settlement, all sorts of strikes were went down.

== Colonies ==
1. Balaghat colony
2. Model house
3. Telugu colony
4. Fitter blocks
5. North and south tank block Centre tank block
6. Wesliyan block
7. North and south oriental colony
8. Police quarters
9. Bungalow section
10. Henry's.

== Education Institute ==
Coromandel has educational institutions from the lower to higher education, but many schools are in a critical position due to lack of students. Some school have shut in the past 10 years like government Tamil medium school NTM school in Balaghat, Tank block.

School's

1. St Sebastian Tamil medium school.
2. St Dominic Savior primary school.
3. Dr BR Ambedkar primary school.
4. Dr BR Ambedkar boys high school.
5. Dr BR Ambedkar girls high school

    Good shepered school.
    NTM School (closed)
    Golden Hills school (closed)

Technical Institution's

1. Government Industrial Training Institute.
2. Government polytechnic Institute.
3. Government School of mines.
4. Vinayaka groups of institute.
5. Community college.

== Government office ==
1. Regional Transport office
2. Food Corporation of India
3. Sub-post office
4. KEB supply office
5. BEML.

== Wildlife ==
Coromandel is covered with mining quarters, so there is little wildlife. But there are wild animals in the outskirts. In the edges of Balaghat colony there is an immense landscape - a square mile of mining area. This is called "Balaghat Black Bucks Reserve" (BBR), which is inhabited by Black deer. Blacks bucks are protected by the Government of India due to the illegal poaching for their valuable skin, antler's and meat. The black deer is being threatened with extinction in the conservation ranking. Hunting of black bucks is an illegal act with punishment of imprisonment of up-to 10 years under the wildlife protecting act of 1972. In BBR there are more than 50- 70 deer but that number is declining due to wild dogs that hunt in pack's, targeting the fawns. There are also wild boar’s which are nocturnal animals.

Mammals

1. Fox
2. Mongoose
3. Rabbit
4. Wild Boar
5. Black Deer
6. Wild Dogs

Birds

1. Lapwing.
2. partridge.
3. Cormorant.
4. spotted dove.
5. great owl.
6. myna.
7. crane. and some land nesting birds.

Reptiles

1. Spectacle Cobra (venomous)
2. Saw scaled viper (venomous)
3. Russel viper (venomous)
4. Common krait (venomous)
5. Green vein snakes (venomous)
6. Rat snakes (non-venomous)

Insects

1. Bullet ants (venomous)
2. scorpion (venomous)
3. centipede
4. millipede
5. dung betel, etc.

== Other place ==
1. Kottilingaishwara huge linga temple
2. Bethamagalam dam major water supply to KGF
3. Murgan temple in BEML nagar
4. Golf club in ooragam
