= Action of 21 April 1806 =

1806 action of the Napoleonic Wars

Coordinates: 30°45′S 30°05′E

- Part of the Napoleonic Wars
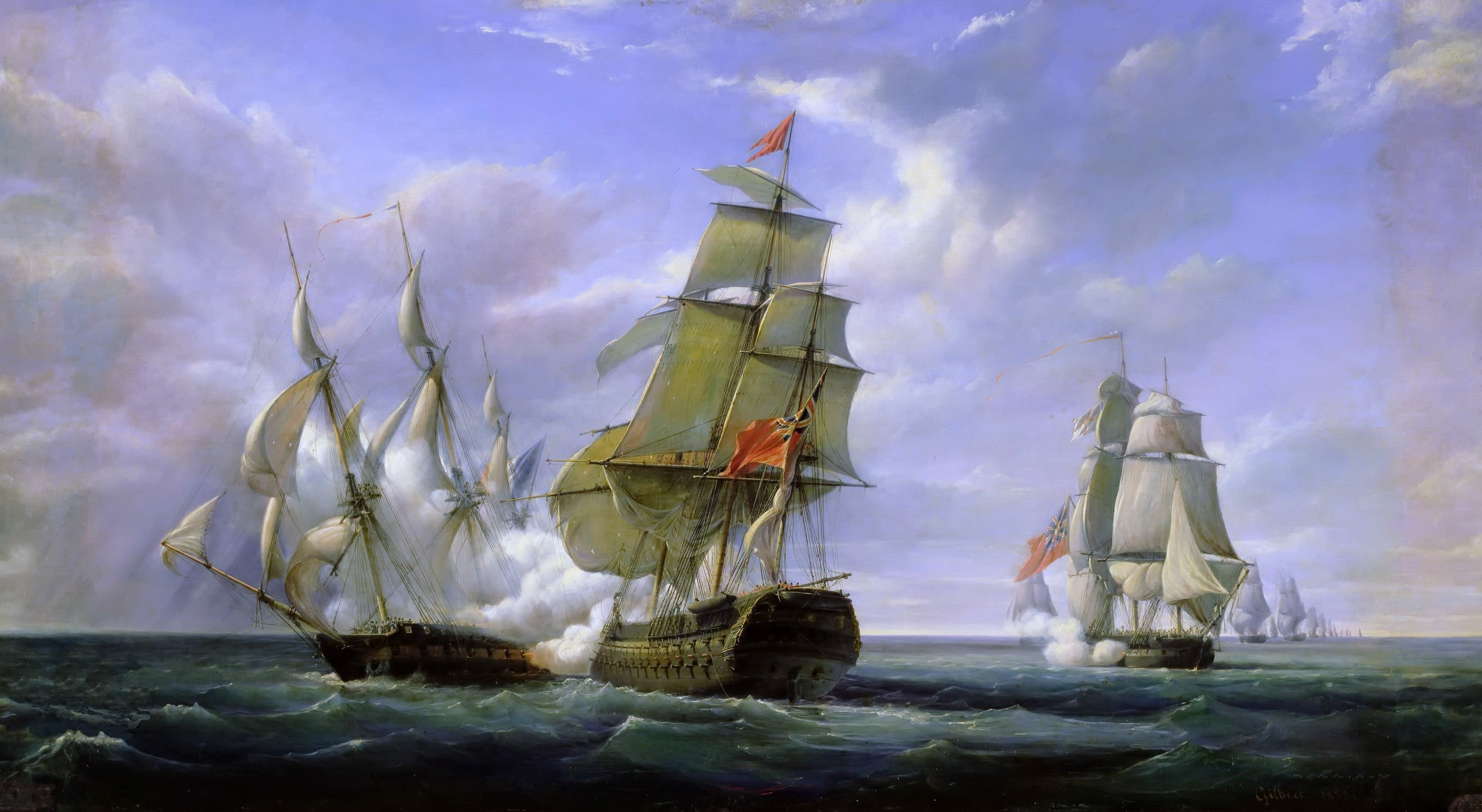
- 1835 painting of the action
Date	21 April 1806
Location	Off the Cape of Good Hope, Indian Ocean
Result	Inconclusive

Belligerents
France	United Kingdom

Commanders and leaders
César-Joseph Bourayne	John Osborn

Strength
1 frigate	2 ships of the line

Casualties and losses
7 killed 25 wounded	None

The action of 21 April 1806 was a minor engagement between the French and British navies off the Cape Colony during the Napoleonic Wars. The Isle Bonaparte and Isle de France were two French colonies in the Indian Ocean, from which privateers and frigate squadrons could engage in commerce raiding and disrupt British shipping. After encountering a strongly escorted British convoy, the 40-gun Cannonière attempted to flee, but was rejoined by the 74-gun HMS Tremendous. In the ensuing battle, Captain Bourayne displayed superior sailmanship and managed to fend off his much stronger opponent by a combination of manoeuvers that rendered the batteries of Tremendous ineffective, and threatened her with sustaining raking fire. The French frigate thus managed to evade and escape.

== Background ==
In 1806, a French squadron under Counter-admiral Charles-Alexandre Léon Durand Linois operated in the Indian Ocean. In addition to the usual frigates and corvettes, in this case the Belle Poule, Sémillante, Berceau and Aventurier, the flaghip of the squadron was a 74-gun ship of the line, the Marengo. On 14 November 1805, the 40-gun Canonnière sailed from Cherbourg under Captain César-Joseph Bourayne in order to reinforce and resupply Linois's squadron. She arrived at Ile de France in April, but failed to find Linois's forces; unbeknownst to Bourayne, the squadron had been destroyed in the action of 13 March 1806. Hoping to join Linois, Canonnière sailed to patrol the Indian Ocean.

== Battle ==
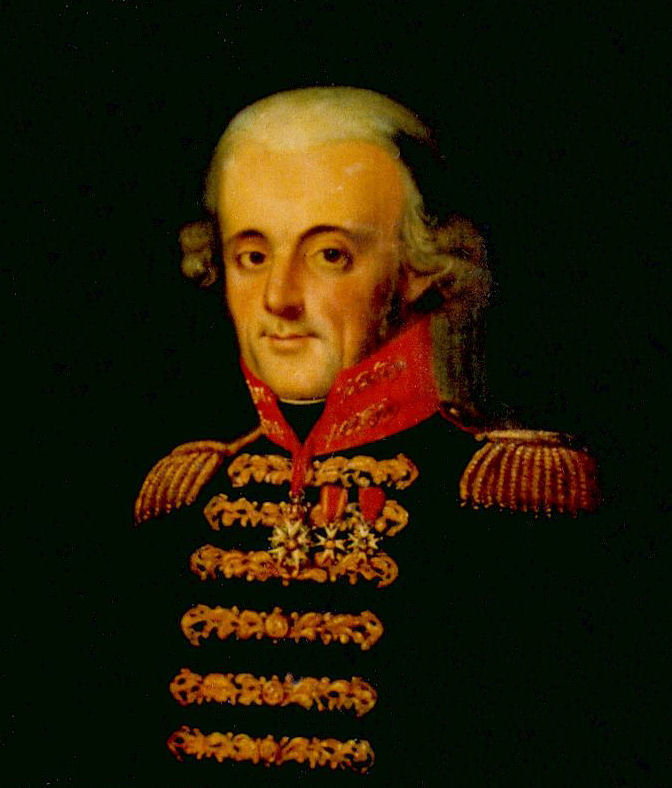
César-Joseph Bourayne, the French commander at the action

On 20 April, as she cruised off Natal, Canonnière spotted an 11-Indiamen convoy, escorted by the 74-gun HMS Tremendous, under Captain John Osborn, and the 50-gun HMS Hindostan, under Captain Alexander Fraser. Tremendous gave chase, and Canonnière attempted to flee the much stronger opponent. The light wind favoured the frigate, which would have escaped had she not been forced to adjust her course to avoid the land. The wind then strengthened, favouring Tremendous. At 15:30, Canonnière and Tremendous began exchanging fire from their chase guns. After a 7-hour chase, Tremendous had closed in enough to make the battle inevitable, and Canonnière turned hard to starboard and opened fire, Tremendous responding in kind. However, Canonnière had the initiative and had prepared her rigging before the manoeuver, while Tremendous had had to imitate the frigate in haste and was still sailing full sail, including her studding sails.

This induced a pronounced heel in Tremendous, hindering the efficiency of her artillery. The British had to adjust their sails in haste, which gave an advantage to Canonnière. At 17:15, the rigging of Tremendous had suffered from the fire of the frigate, and she was in danger of losing her mizen. Osborn then attempted the rake Canonnière, but the frigate outmanoeuvred the 74-gun and took the position which would put the bow of Tremendous in her broadside at the end of her evolution, which Osborn thus cancelled. At 17:35, the two ships were sailing on almost parallel courses, but increasing distance. The Indiaman Charlton fired a broadside at Canonnière in passing, from a long distance, but her fire was ineffective and she did not press her attack. The frigate and the British eventually broke contact.

== Aftermath ==
In spite of the overwhelming superiority of her opponents, Canonnière had managed to escape with light damage, and Captain Bourayne wounded, but not seriously. The British historian William James praised Bourayne for his sober and accurate account of the engagement: "No rodomontade; all is plainly, yet minutely told, and, in every material point, agrees with the entry in the British ship's log"; he furthermore cites the action as a textbook example of defence against a stronger opponent:

The action of the Tremendous and Canonnière affords a lesson to officers, who find themselves suddenly assailed by a decidedly superior force. It teaches them that, by a judicious and protracted defence, their ship may escape, even when, in a manner, close under the guns of an opponent, whose single broadside, well directed (the chief point wherein the Tremendous appears to have failed), must either sink or disable her.

Canonnière was very nearly captured on 29 April, however, when she sailed into the harbour of Simon's Town, ignorant of the fact that the Dutch colony had been captured by the British. A boat of the frigate was sent ashore with ensign Larouvraye, and as soon as it reach the ground, the Dutch flags on the buildings were replaced by the Union Jack, and the forts opened fire on Canonnière, which narrowly escaped without being seriously hit. Bourayne then return to Reunion, and from there cruised to the Philippines. He would continue to operate in the Indian Ocean and undertake commerce raiding.

== Bibliography ==
- Troude, Onésime-Joachim (1867). "Combats particuliers 1806". Batailles navales de la France. Challamel ainé. pp. 461–463.
