= Coromandel Coast =

Coastal region in South East India

Coordinates: 13.3667°N 80.3333°E

The Coromandel Coast (Tamil: [tʃoːɻɐmɐɳɖɐlɐm]) is a coastal region along the southeastern front of the Indian peninsula. Its delimitations are numerous, but generally admitted to be bounded by the Krishna river mouth to the north, the Bay of Bengal to the east, the Point Calimere cape to the south, and the Eastern Ghats to the west. Some may define its northern boundaries up to Ganjam. This region can be extending over an area of about 22,800 square kilometres. The coast has an average elevation of 80 metres and is backed by the Eastern Ghats, a chain of low lying and flat-topped hills.

Coromandel Coast within contemporaneous India delimitations.

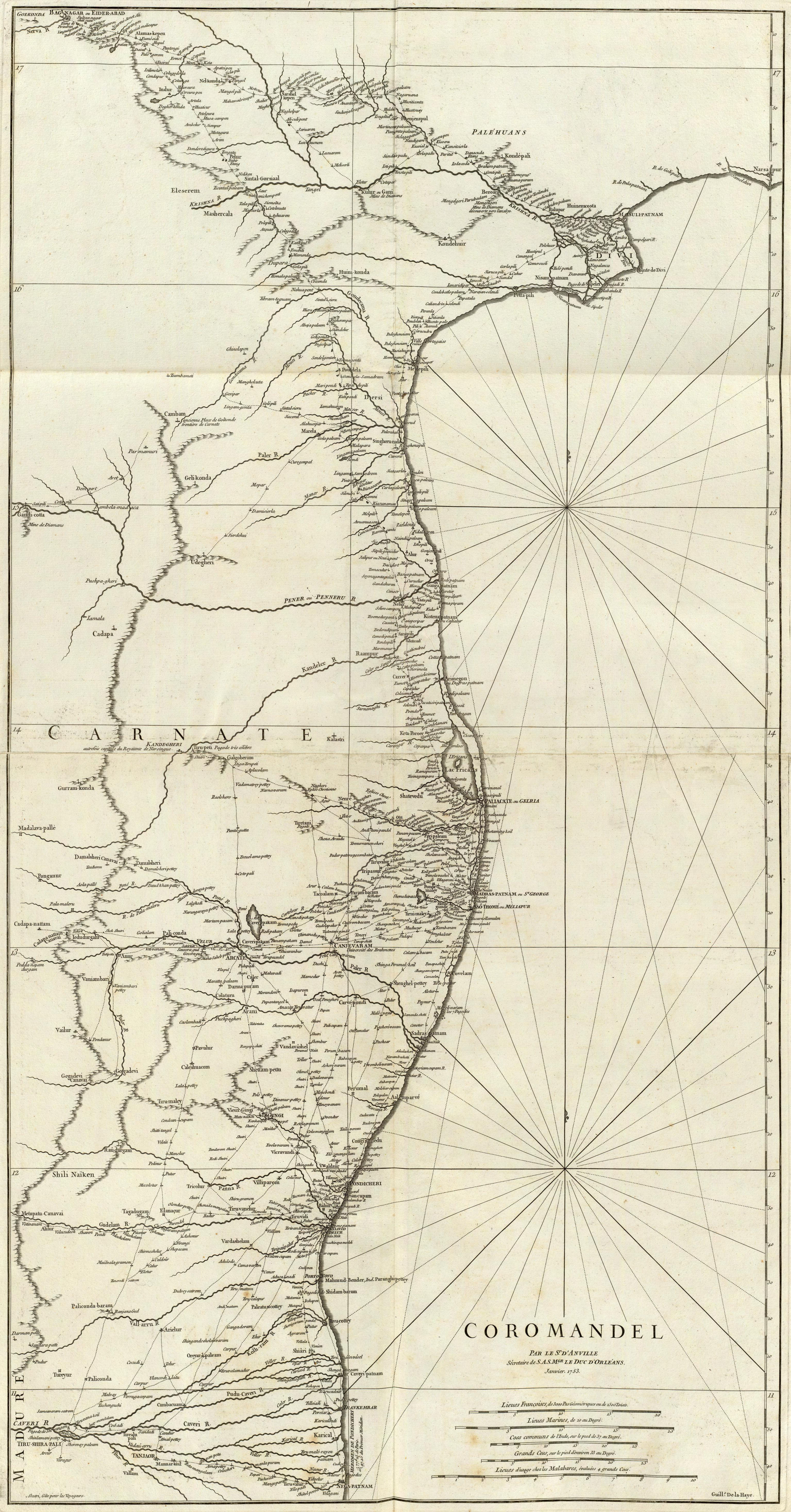
A 1753 French Map of the Coromandel coast which mapped the boundaries limited to Circar coast from Kavery Delta region.

The land of the Chola dynasty was called Cholamandalam in Tamil, literally translated as "the realm of the Cholas", from which Coromandel is derived.

In historical Muslim sources from the 12th century onward, the Coromandel Coast was notably called the Maʿbar Coast.

== Etymology ==
The land of the Chola dynasty was called Cōḻamaṇḍalam (சோழமண்டலம்) in Tamil, translated as 'The realm of the Cholas', from which the Portuguese derived the name Coromandel. The name could also be derived from Karaimaṇḍalam, meaning 'The realm of the shores'.

Another theory is that the first Dutch ship to India stopped at Karimanal, an island village to the north of Pulicat. The sailors aboard the ship mispronounced the village's name as 'Corimondal' and the name stuck thereafter.

An Italian explorer, Ludovico di Varthema, perhaps first gave the name Coromandel in 1510, which was then used on maps by the Portuguese, but it was the Dutch who took up serious trading there.

== History ==
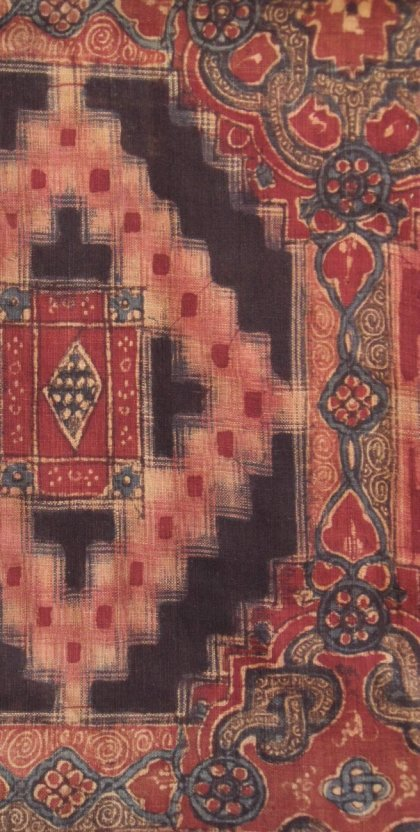
Sarasa chintz from the Coromandel Coast, 17th or 18th century, made for the Japanese market. Private collection, Nara Prefecture.

By late 1530 the Coromandel Coast was home to three Portuguese settlements at Negapatão, São Tomé de Meliapore, and Paliacate. In the 17th and 18th centuries, the Coromandel Coast was the scene of rivalries among European powers for control of the India trade. The British established themselves at Fort St George (Madras) and Masulipatnam, the Dutch at Pulicat, Sadras, the Belgians at Covelong, the French at Pondicherry, Karaikal and Nizampatnam, the Danish in Dansborg or Tranquebar.

The Coromandel Coast supplied Indian Muslim eunuchs to the Thai palace and court of Siam (modern Thailand). The Thai at times asked eunuchs from China to visit the court in Thailand and advise them on court ritual since they held them in high regard.

Eventually the British won out, although France retained the tiny enclaves of Pondichéry and Karaikal until 1954. Chinese lacquer goods, including boxes, screens, and chests, became known as "Coromandel" goods in the 18th century, because many Chinese exports were consolidated at the Coromandel ports.

Two of the famous books on the economic history of the Coromandel Coast are Merchants, companies, and commerce on the Coromandel Coast, 1650–1740 (Arasaratnam, Oxford University Press, 1986) and The World of the Weaver in Northern Coromandel, c. 1750 – c. 1850 (P. Swarnalatha, Orient Longman, 2005).

On 26 December 2004, one of the deadliest natural disasters in modern history, the Indian Ocean earthquake, struck off the western coast of Sumatra (Indonesia). The earthquake and subsequent tsunami reportedly killed over 220,000 people around the rim of the Indian Ocean. The tsunami devastated the Coromandel Coast, killing many and sweeping away many coastal communities.

== Vegetation ==
=== Flora ===
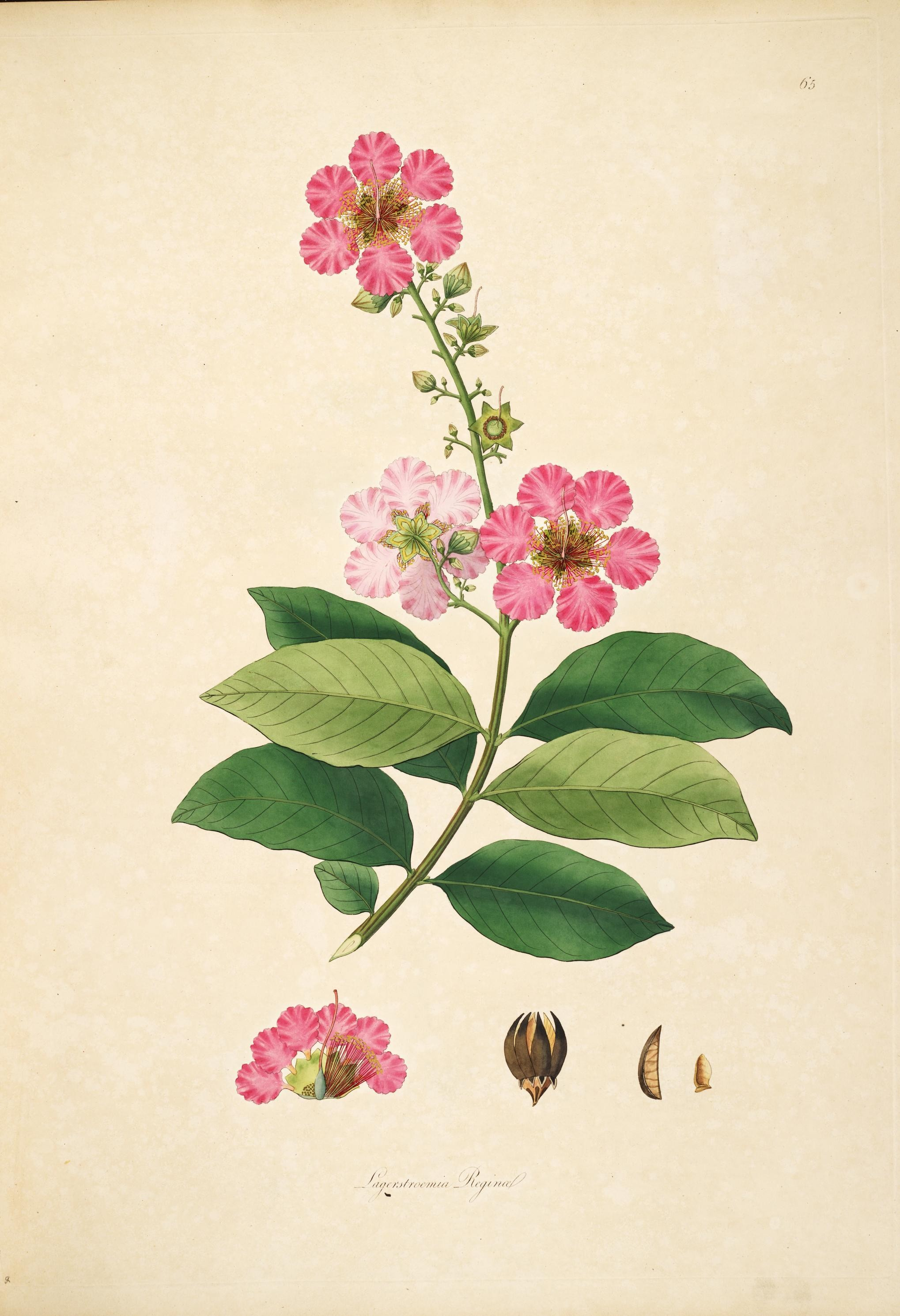
Lagerstroemia speciosa, from William Roxburgh's 1795 publication, Plants of the coast of Coromandel - Volume 1

The Coromandel Coast is home to the East Deccan dry evergreen forests ecoregion, which runs in a narrow strip along the coast. Unlike most of the other tropical dry forest Biome regions of India, where the trees lose their leaves during the dry season, the East Deccan dry evergreen forests retain their leathery leaves year round.

The Coromandel Coast is also home to extensive mangrove forests along the low-lying coast and river deltas, and several important wetlands, notably Kaliveli Lake and Pulicat Lake, that provide habitat to thousands of migrating and resident birds.

== Applications of the name ==
Four ships of the Royal Navy have borne the name HMS Coromandel after the Indian coast. The Coromandel Peninsula in New Zealand was named after one of these ships, and the town of Coromandel, New Zealand was named after the peninsula. Coromandel Valley, South Australia, and its neighbouring suburb, Coromandel East, gained their names from the ship Coromandel, which arrived in Holdfast Bay from London in 1837 with 156 English settlers. After the ship reached the shore, some of its sailors deserted, intending to remain behind in South Australia, and took refuge in the hills in the Coromandel Valley region.

In Slovene, the idiom Indija Koromandija (India Coromandel) means a land of plenty, a promised land, a utopia where "Houses are bleached with cheese and covered with cake".

Edward Lear situates his nonsense poem The Yonghy Bonghy Bo by citing Coromandel on the first line: On the Coast of Coromandel.

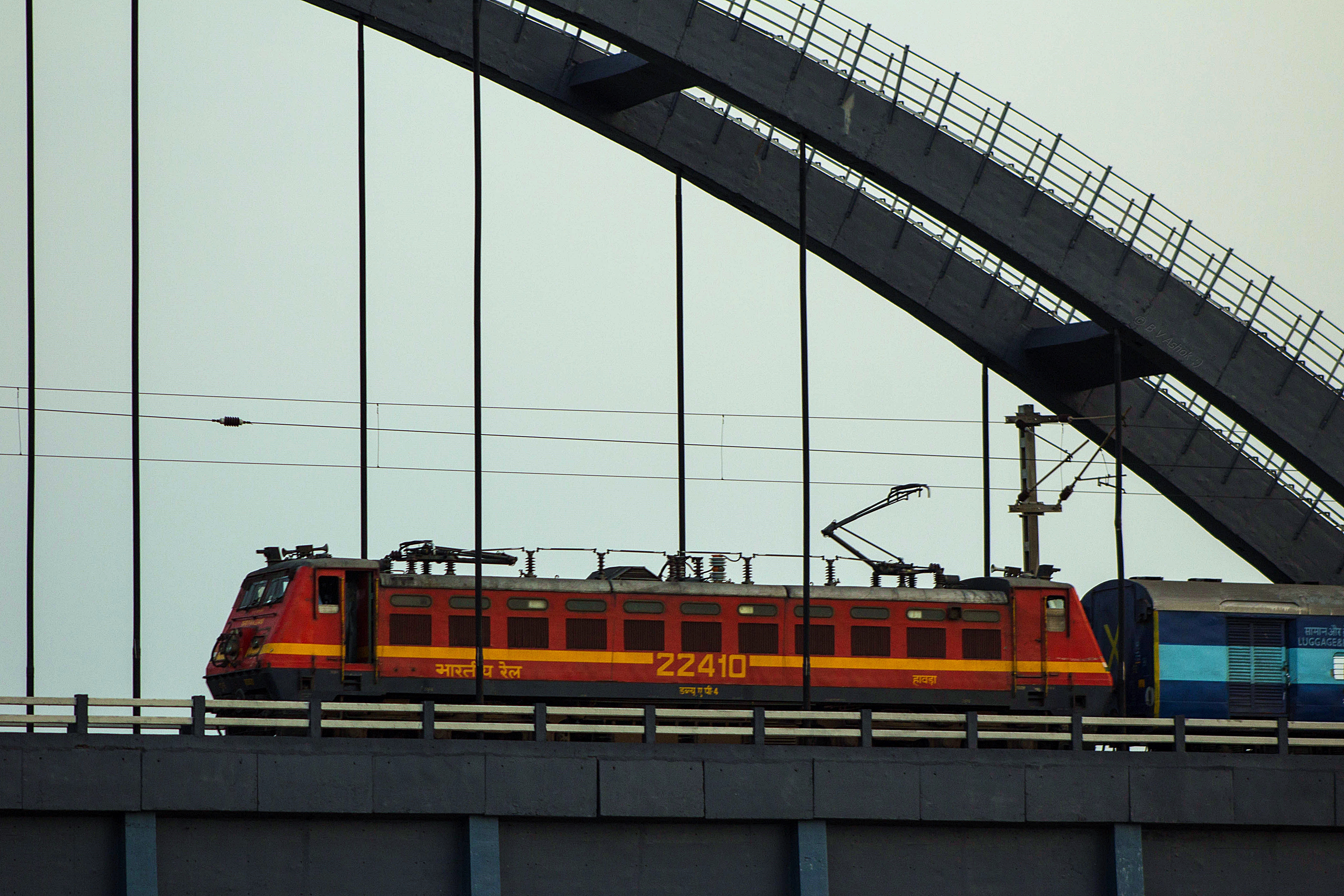
The Coromandel Express at the Godavari arch bridge towards Rajahmundry.

The Coromandel Express is a train of the Indian Railways. The daily train runs down the east coast of India between Shalimar railway station, West Bengal, and Chennai Central railway station, Tamil Nadu.

== See also ==
- Coastline of Tamil Nadu
- Malabar Coast
- Presidency of Coromandel and Bengal Settlements
