= Presidency of Coromandel and Bengal Settlements =

Indian subdivision

Coordinates: 24°00′N 88°00′E

- Presidency of British India
- 17 July 1682–1700
- Flag
- History
  - Abolition of the Bengal Agency: 17 July 1682
  - Creation of the Bengal Presidency: 1700
Preceded by	Succeeded by
Bengal Agency	Bengal Presidency

The Presidency of Coromandel and Bengal Settlements was an administrative division of British India, established by the East India Company on 17 July 1682.

== History ==
In 1658, all the settlements in Bengal and on the Coromandel coast were made subordinate to Fort St George. The presidency of Coromandel and Bengal Settlements, named after the Coromandel Coast and Bengal, was established by the company for the administration of Bengal following the abolition of the Bengal Agency.

Between 1694 and 1698, the administration of the territories of the presidency was subordinated to Madras (Presidency of Fort St. George). Then again, the authority of the presidency of Coromandel and Bengal Settlements was reestablished until the creation of the Bengal Presidency in 1700.

== See also ==
- Fort William
- Madras Presidency
- Territorial evolution of the British Empire
