= Coromandel railway station =

Railway station in Adelaide, South Australia

Coromandel
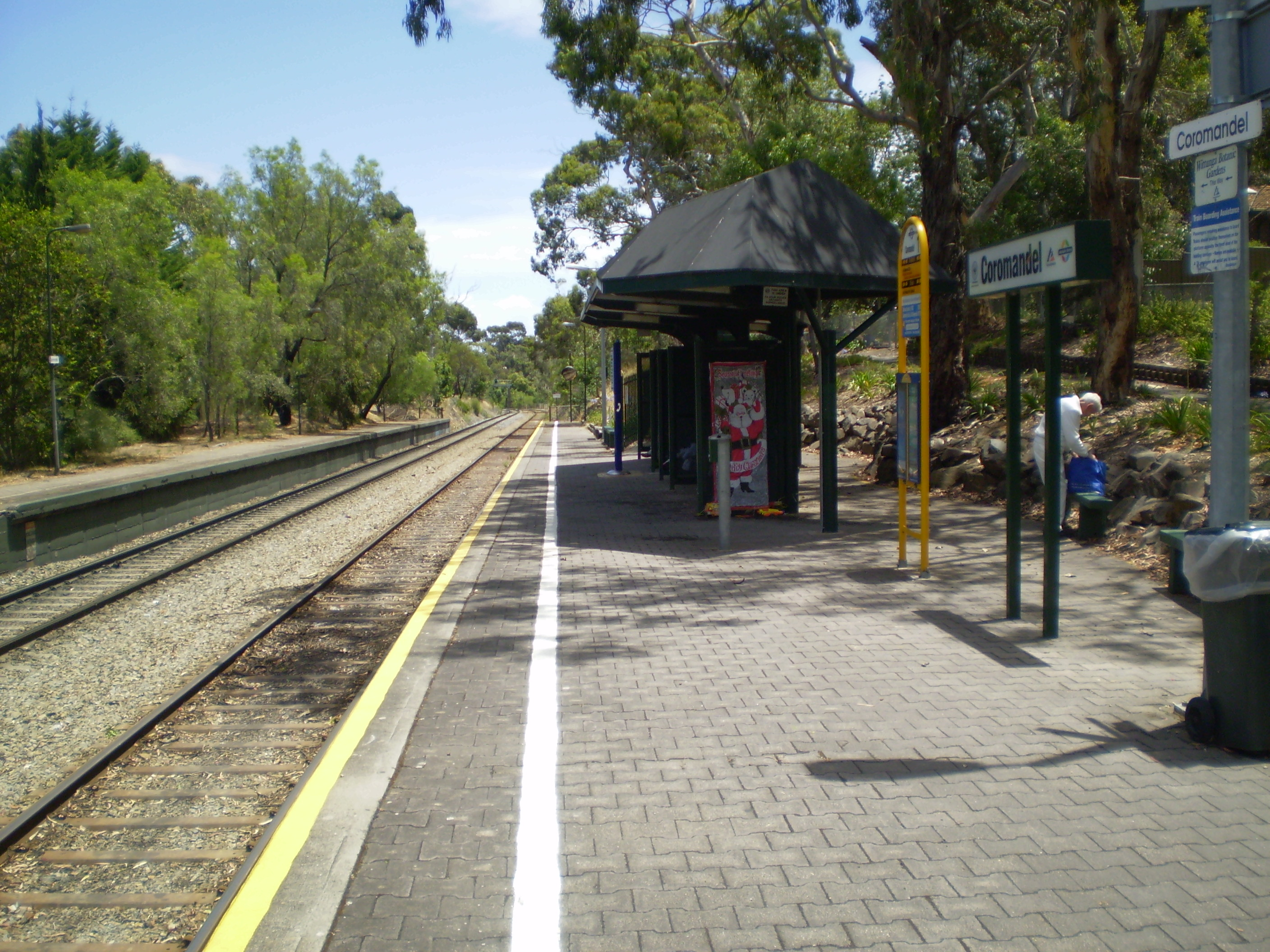
- Westbound view from Platform 2, December 2007

General information
- Location: Brighton Parade, Blackwood
- Coordinates: 35°01′31″S 138°36′52″E
- Elevation: 832 feet (254 m)
- Owner: Department for Infrastructure and Transport
- Operator: Adelaide Metro
- Line: Belair
- Distance: 17.2 km from Adelaide
- Platforms: 2 (1 disused)
- Connections: Bus

Construction
- Structure type: Ground
- Parking: Yes
- Cycle facilities: Yes
- Accessible: Yes

Other information
- Station code: 16504 (to City); 18574 (to Belair)
- Website: Adelaide Metro

History
- Opened: 1883
- Rebuilt: 2009

Services
Preceding station	Adelaide Metro	Following station
Eden Hills towards Adelaide	Belair line	Blackwood towards Belair
Location

Coromandel railway station is located on the Belair line. Situated in the Adelaide southern foothills suburb of Blackwood in South Australia, it is 17.2 kilometres from Adelaide station and 254 metres above sea level.

== History ==
The station opened in 1883 and was originally named Brighton Parade. In 1995, the western side platform was closed when the inbound line was converted to standard gauge as part of the One Nation Adelaide-Melbourne line gauge conversion project. The station now consists of a single platform with a covered shelter which serves trains going in both directions.

As part of the renewal of the Belair line in 2009, improvements to access ramps, seating, fencing, lighting, signage and safety markings have taken place at Coromandel. Under the 'Adopt a Station' program run by TransAdelaide, the station was adopted by the Blackwood Neighbourhood Watch group, who have assumed responsibility for the removal of graffiti, assisting with the landscaping of the station grounds and reporting vandalism incidents.

== Services by platform ==
Platform	Destination/s	Notes
1	Adelaide/Belair	
2		Not in use

== Transport links ==
Bus transfers: Stop 34 Johnson Pde
Route no.	Destination & route details
197X	Coromandel station to City via Main Rd and Belair Rd
