= HMS Hindostan (1804) =

Ship of the line of the Royal Navy

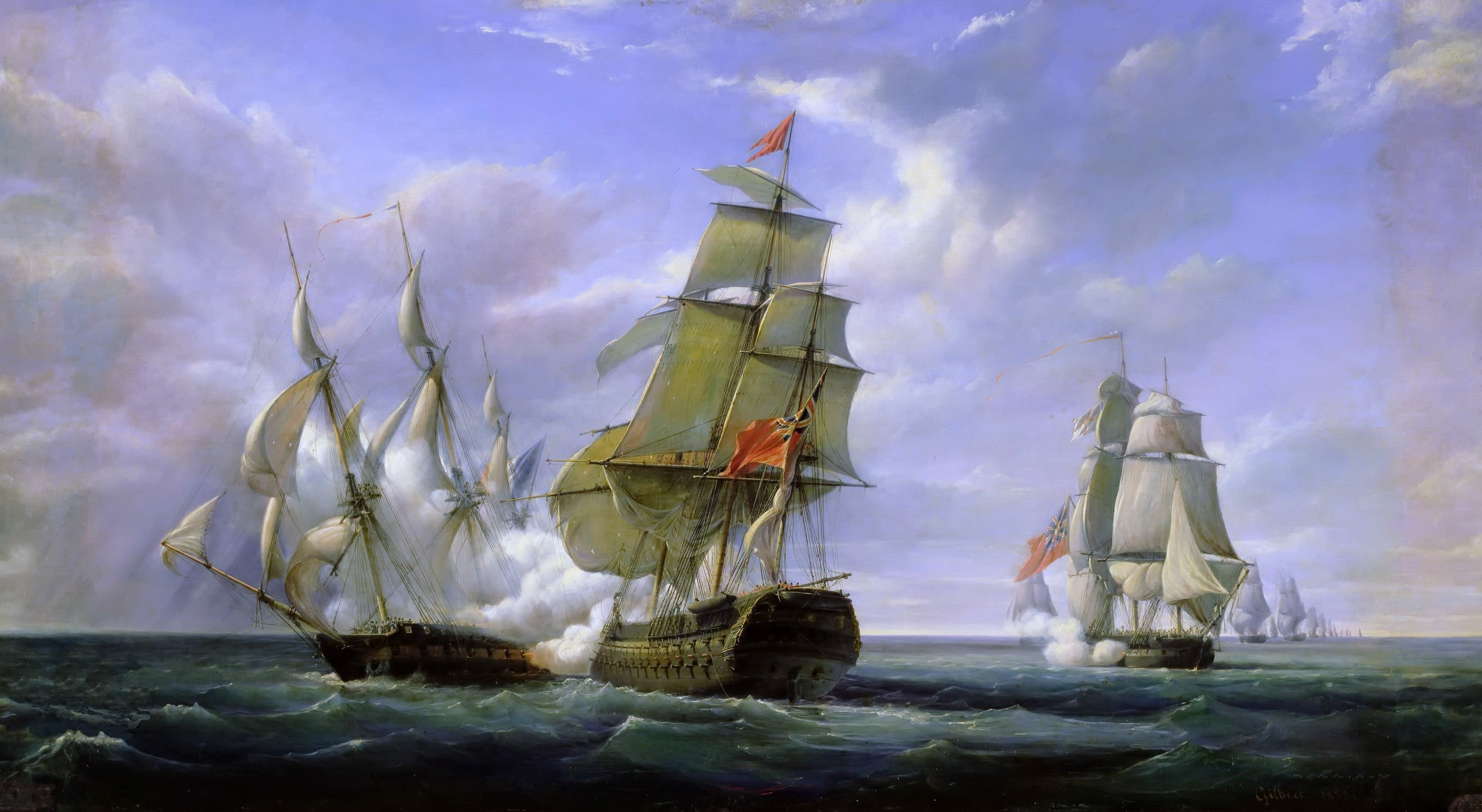
- Hindostan (right) at the action of 21 April 1806

History

Great Britain
- Name: Admiral Rainier
- Owner: Hudson, Bacon & Co.
- Builder: Hudson, Bacon & Co., Calcutta
- Launched: 1798, or 1799
- Fate: Sold to the Royal Navy in 1804

United Kingdom
- Name: HMS Hindostan
- Owner: Royal Navy
- Acquired: 30 May 1804
- Renamed: Renamed Dolphin, 1819; Renamed Justitia 1831
- Fate: Sold out of service 1855

General characteristics
- Class & type: Fourth rate; Storeship or troopship from 1807
- Tons burthen: 511, 88654/94, or 88688/94 (bm)
- Length: 158 ft 6 in (48.3 m) (overall); 121 ft 9 in (37.1 m) (keel)
- Beam: 37 ft (11.3 m)
- Sail plan: Full-rigged ship
- Complement: Merchantman: 80 men; 4th Rate: 294 men; Storeship: 141 men
- Armament: Merchantman: 22 × 6&12-pounder guns; 4th Rate: 26 × 18-pounder guns (Lower Deck ) + 26 × 24-pounder carronades (Upper Deck ); From 1811: 20 × 24-pounder carronades + 2 × 9-pounder guns

HMS Hindostan (variously Hindustan or Hindoostan) was a 50-gun two-decker fourth rate of the Royal Navy. She was originally a teak-built East Indiaman named Admiral Rainier launched at Calcutta in 1799 that the Royal Navy brought into service in May 1804. Before the Royal Navy purchased her, Admiral Rainier made two trips to England for the British East India Company (EIC), as an "extra ship", i.e., under charter. Perhaps her best known voyage was her trip to Australia in 1809 when she and Dromedary brought Governor Lachlan Macquarie to replace Governor William Bligh after the Rum Rebellion. In later years she became a store ship, and in 1819 was renamed Dolphin. She was hulked in 1824 to serve as a prison ship, and renamed Justitia in 1831. She was finally sold in 1855.

== Merchantman ==
Hudson, Bacon & Co. built Admiral Rainier in Calcutta for their own account and launched her in 1799. The EIC immediately chartered her for a voyage from Calcutta to England. Captain William Lay left Calcutta on 28 December 1799, reached St Helena on 15 June 1800 and Falmouth on 2 September, and arrived at Deptford on 5 October.

Admiral Rainier was admitted to the Registry of Great Britain on 5 January 1801. Lay received a Letter of Marque on 9 January. He then sailed her back to India, apparently not under contract with the EIC.

Lay sailed Admiral Rainier to England for a second time, again under charter to the EIC, leaving Calcutta on 1 January 1803. She passed Kedgeree on 1 February, reached St Helena on 16 July, and arrived at Gravesend on 27 September.

On 30 May 1804 the Admiralty purchased her and renamed her Hindostan. An earlier Hindostan had just been lost in April in a fire at sea.

== Naval Service ==
Captain Mark Robinson commissioned her in July, and then Captain Alexander Fraser took command in August. He sailed her for the East Indies in early 1805. There, together with Tremendous, she fought the inconclusive Action of 21 April 1806 against Canonnière. Tremendous carried the brunt of the action but suffered no casualties. The French lost seven men killed and 25 wounded.

Captain Bendall Littehalles recommissioned Hindostan in December 1806. A year later she was repaired at Woolwich in January 1807. Then in February Captain Thomas Bowen took command. On 28 June she sailed as a convoy escort to the Mediterranean, returning towards the end of the year.

On 11 November, the Admiralty ordered her to be converted to a storeship and her guns were reduced from 54 to 22, primarily by the removal of the guns on her lower deck. Commander Lewis Hole took command in December. In April 1808 her captain was Commander Fitzowen Skinner and she was with a squadron operating off Lisbon.

=== Australia ===
In November 1808 Hindostan was recommissioned as a troopship under Commander John Pasco. On 29 March 1809, Hindostan and Dromedary recaptured Gustavus, of Charlestown. (Note: Prize money was paid in March 1810. A commissioned officer's share of the prize money was worth £51 17s 2d; a seaman's share was worth £1 0s 6¼d.)

Pasco sailed Hindostan to New South Wales on 3 May 1809. Hindostan and Dromedary brought with them Governor Lachlan Macquarie and the 1st Battalion of Macquarie's own regiment, the 73rd Regiment of Foot. Macquarie's first task was to restore orderly, lawful government and discipline in the colony following the Rum Rebellion against Governor William Bligh. The 73rd Foot was there to replace the New South Wales Corps. The vessels arrived on 28 December. Hindostan and Dromedary departed from Sydney on 12 May 1810. They took with them a contingent of the 102nd Regiment of Foot (New South Wales Corps), as well as Governor Bligh and his family.

== Late career and fate ==
Hindostan was converted to a storeship in 1811 under Duncan Weir. Hindostan shared with San Juan, Sabine, Lavinia, Hyacinth and Tuscan in the American droits for Phoenix, Margaret, Allegany and Tyger, captured on 8 August 1812 at Gibraltar on the arrival of the news of the outbreak of the War of 1812. (Note: In May 1816 there was distribution to the sharing vessels of their portions of two-thirds of the first three American vessels and nine-tenths of Tyger. A first-class share was worth £120 16s 0½d; a sixth-class share was worth £1 19s 9¼d.)

Hindostan was in the Mediterranean in 1815, and then reverted to being a storeship in Woolwhich. On 22 September 1819 she was renamed Dolphin.

Dolphin was hulked at Woolwich in March 1824 to serve as a prison ship. On 16 October 1829, she sprang a leak and sank at Chatham, Kent, with the loss of three lives, but she was refloated, repaired, and returned to service. She was renamed Justitia in 1831, the Royal Navy having sold an earlier Justitia in 1830. Justitia was finally sold on 24 October 1855.
