= Coromandel (1834 ship) =

Ship (1834)

History

United Kingdom
- Name: Coromandel
- Launched: 1834, Quebec

General characteristics
- Tons burthen: 662 (bm)
- Length: 133 feet 7 inches (40.72 m)
- Beam: 33 feet 3 inches (10.13 m)
- Depth: 23 feet 0 inches (7.01 m)

Coromandel was a sailing ship built at Quebec in 1834. She was owned by Ridgeway and her home port was Glasgow. She was the first ship to bring settlers to South Australia after it was proclaimed a colony in 1836 and one of the early ships bringing New Zealand Company settlers to Wellington, New Zealand in 1840.

== Construction ==
Coromandel was a three-masted, square-rigged ship with 13 foresails, three top sails, three-fore topmast stay sails, two main sails, and three main top sails. She had one long boat and two quarter boats. The ship was made from oak, black birch, and red pine. She was sheathed in yellow metal.

== Voyages ==
In 1836, before Coromandel sailed for Australia, the South Australian Commission gave a dinner on board to about 150 young married persons and 36 children. On 1 September 1836 she sailed from Blackwell Dock, London under Captain William Chesser to South Australia, berthing at the South Australia Company's Kingscote, Kangaroo Island base on 10 January 1837 and on 12 January anchoring at Holdfast Bay. Apart from the settlers, Coromandel also had South Australia's first bank on board as well as £10,000 in notes.

In June 1838 she sailed from London to Sydney in 110 days under Captain Neale.

Captained by Edward French, the ship, advertised to depart 20 November and Portsmouth 25 November, sailed from St Catherines docks, London on 10 December 1839 with 47 passengers. She took shelter from poor weather in the Bay of Biscay for six weeks, and also stopped at Cape Town for supplies. It docked at Sydney where it collected a further 3 passengers and also 200 sheep, 40 bullocks, and four horses for New Zealand. Coromandel arrived in New Zealand after a long voyage of 260 days on 29 August 1840.

On 7 July 1843 Coromandel sailed under Captain Harewood from Gravesend to Bombay carrying troops.

In 1845 she was sailing on the run from Liverpool to New Orleans.

== Fate ==
Coromandel was listed in Lloyd's Register of 1855 as being owned by Brooke & Co, with Captain Walker, master.

== Coromandel Valley ==
Coromandel Valley in the Adelaide Hills and Coromandel Street in Wellington, New Zealand are named after the ship.
