= Cantabrian Expedition =

The Cantabrian Expedition (in Spanish: Expedición Cántabra) was a joint Anglo-Spanish landing operation set in motion towards the end of 1810, during the Peninsular War.

The plan was to establish a base at Santoña, then in the hands of the French, from which to free the western part of the coast of the Cantabrian Sea of French troops and then move on to Guetaria, freeing up the central and eastern coast of the region, thereby cutting off Irun as the main gateway for French supplies to Spain. The landing party consisted of 1,200 Spanish troops, under Field Marshal Renovales and 800 British Marines.

However, although the expedition had some initial success at Gijón, a sudden gale prevented the landing party from reaching the shore at Santoña and the squadron had to head back to Galicia, where, on their way into port at Viveiro, two of the Spanish ships, the frigate Santa Maria Magdalena and the brig Palomo, were destroyed with great loss of life, Magdalena having collided with HMS Narcissus (1801) shortly before foundering.

== Squadron ==
The squadron, under the command of Captain Joaquín Zarauz, and made up of five frigates, two brigs, two schooners, four gunboats and fifteen troopships, plus a landing force of two thousand troops, sailed from La Coruña on 14 October 1810, headed first for Gijón and then for Santoña.

Spanish ships

- Santa Maria Magdalena (frigate) – Captain Blas Salcedo
- Palomo (brig) – Frigate lieutenant Diego de Quevedo
- Insurgente Roncalesa (schooner)
- Liniers (schooner)
- Corzo (gunboat)
- Estrago (gunboat)
- Gorrión (gunboat)
- Sorpresa (gunboat)
- 15 troopships

British ships

- HMS Arethusa (1781) (frigate) – Captain Mends
- HMS Medusa (frigate)
- HMS Narcissus (1801) (frigate)
- HMS Amazon (1799) (frigate)
- HMS Port Mahon (1798) (brig-sloop)

== Background ==
Most of the British ships making up the joint squadron had already participated the previous July in a joint Anglo-Spanish operation led by Mends, on board Arethusa, with Medusa, under Captain Bowles; Narcissus, under Captain Aylmer, who led the landing party on that occasion; HMS Dryad (1795); and Amazon, and which had consisted in transporting Brigadier-general Porlier's 500 Spanish troops to Santoña. A brigade of British seamen and Marines had also been part of the landing party and had seen action onshore.

== Operation ==
The squadron sailed from La Coruña on 14 October, reaching Gijón on 16 or 18 October. Most of the French garrison of 700 men happened to be away searching for Porlier and the remaining battalion fled, leaving large amounts of supplies and several ships in the port for Renovales and Porlier, who had reached Gijón from inland.

In response, General Bonet sent all available French troops in Asturias towards Gijón while the allied squadron sailed off, on 20 October, in the opposite direction, towards Santoña, in the Bay of Biscay, where they anchored in the bay on 23 October, until that same day a sudden gale forced them to cut their anchor cables and head out to sea. The four gunboats capsized but their crews were saved.

== Tragedy at Viveiro ==
=== Spanish account ===
The ships then all headed back to Viveiro, where a hurricane caused the Magdalena to founder and the Palomo to be smashed against the rocks. (Note: Of the 75 men on board the Palomo, 50 perished in the storm, while the remaining 25, including their captain, managed to reach the shore. (González Fernández.)) Of the 508 people on board the Magdalena, 500 perished in the storm, including her captain, Blas Salcedo, and the commander-in-chief of the Expedition, Joaquín Zarauz. Of the eight that managed to reach shore, five later died of their injuries.

=== Oman's account (1908) ===
The allied landing party was about to land at Vivero, when it was scattered by a hurricane from the Bay of Biscay. A Spanish frigate and brig, an English brig, and several gunboats and transports were dashed on the rocky coast, and lost with all hands. This disaster, which cost 800 lives, compelled Renovales to return to Corunna (November 2). (Oman, 1908: p. 487.)

== Conclusion ==
It is evident that the time wasted from the moment the plan was set in motion (May) until the squadron set sail (mid-October), with the notoriously bad weather conditions in the Bay of Biscay in autumn and winter, greatly influenced the outcome of the expedition. This delay was partly due to the time it took for the commander-in-chief of the expedition, Renovales, to raise the necessary troops.

Oman (1908: pp. 487–488.)

But the raid had not been useless; it had compelled Bonnet to evacuate many posts, distracted the garrisons of Santander and Biscay, and even induced Caffarelli to march down to the coast with his newly-arrived division, the 'Reserve of the Army of Spain.' Seras, too, had drawn up the greater part of his scattered division to the north-west, thus leaving the borders of Galicia and the Tras-os-Montes hardly watched. This enabled Mahy to send down troops into the plain of Leon, and to establish something like a blockade around Astorga.
Such was the effect of the sea-power, even when it was used sparingly and by unskilful hands. The raids along the northern coast had kept Bonnet and the troops in Santander and Biscay fully employed; they had distracted Seras, Caffarelli, and even the garrisons of the province of Burgos. They had saved Mahy and Silveira from attack, and had lighted up a blaze of insurrection in the western hills of Cantabria which, thanks to the energy of Porlier and his colleague Longa, was never extinguished.
