= Blas Salcedo y Salcedo =

Spanish naval officer (1758–1810)

- Born: 1758; Fuentenovilla, Guadalajara
- Died: 2 November 1810 (aged 51–52); Viveiro, Lugo
- Military career
- Branch: Navy
- Rank: Captain

Blas Salcedo y Salcedo (1758–1810) was a Spanish naval officer.

== Early career ==
In 1775 he served as a junior officer on board the xebec Atrevido, part of Pedro Castejón's squadron for the Invasion of Algiers (1775) seeing active service on several occasions. Promoted to frigate lieutenant in 1782 and lieutenant in 1784, he was given command of a gunboat, again seeing action in an attack on Algiers as part of a squadron led by Antonio Barceló.

After being stationed on land for several years, in 1794 he was given command of the brig Atocha and, in 1796, command of the brig Pájaro. Promoted that year to frigate captain, the following year he was given command of the frigate Medea on board which he made two voyages to the Americas. Appointed military commander of Viveiro, Lugo, in 1800, he later requested to return to active duty on board a ship and, in 1802, was given command of the frigate Clara.

== Peninsular War ==
Promoted to captain in 1808, he was given command of the 38-gun Santa Maria Magdalena on board which he patrolled the Cantabrian Sea and saw action that year at Santander (1808).

=== Cantabrian Expedition ===
The Magdalena was then chosen as flagship of a joint Anglo-Spanish landing operation under the command of Captain Joaquín Zarauz, to establish a base at Santoña, in Cantabria, then in the hands of the French, from which to free the western part of the coast of the Cantabrian Sea of French troops and then move on to Guetaria, freeing up the central and eastern coast of the region, thereby cutting off Irun as the main gateway for French supplies to Spain. The landing party consisted of 1,200 Spanish troops, under Field Marshal Renovales and 800 British Marines. (Note: The British squadron of four frigates and a brig-sloop was commanded by Mends, on board the HMS Arethusa (1781). The other British ships were HMS Medusa, HMS Narcissus (1801), HMS Amazon (1799) and the brig-sloop HMS Port Mahon (1798), most of which had participated some months earlier in a similar, but more modest joint Anglo-Spanish expedition, on that occasion led by Mends.)

Although the expedition had had some success in capturing the important port of Gijón, in Asturias, as they were anchored in the bay of Santoña in preparation for the landing operation a sudden gale forced ships to head out to sea on 23 October, the Magdalena and the Palomo cutting their anchor cables.

The ships then all headed back to Viveiro, where a hurricane caused the Magdalena to founder and the Palomo to be smashed against the rocks. (Note: Of the 75 men on board the Palomo, 50 perished in the storm, while the remaining 25, including their captain, managed to reach the shore. (González Fernández.)) Of the 508 people on board the Magdalena, 500 perished in the storm, including Blas Salcedo, and the commander-in-chief of the Expedition, Zarauz. Of the eight that managed to reach shore, five later died of their injuries.

Captain Salcedo's body was found embracing that of his son, who had also perished in the storm. As a result, a Royal Order (Orden Real) was issued prohibiting fathers and sons or brothers and brothers being part of the crew on the same ship.
