= Joaquín Zarauz =

Spanish naval officer (1756–1810)

- Born: 1756; Laredo, Cantabria
- Died: 1 November 1810 (aged 53–54); Viveiro, Lugo
- Military career
- Branch: Navy
- Rank: Captain

Joaquín Zarauz y de Santander (1756–1810) was a Spanish naval officer.

== Early career ==
After enlisting as a cadet-midshipman in 1775, Zarauz was promoted to successive junior officer ranks, to lieutenant of the 5th Company of the 8th Battalion of the Spanish Marine Infantry in 1778, and to frigate lieutenant in 1782. The following year he was promoted to captain of the 4th Company of the 7th Battalion based at Cádiz and, in 1784 he was promoted to navy lieutenant.

In 1785, he embarked on the 70-gun Triunfante, sailing to Malta and back to Cartagena, where he was given command of the galley Concepción, command he held until 1789. Zarauz then served in the squadrons of Antonio Barceló, Juan de Lángara and Federico Gravina.

Promoted to frigate captain in 1796, Zarauz, as second-in-command, served on board Santa Ana, Príncipe, San Hermenegildo and the San Fernando, after which he was given command of the frigate Diana until she was dismantled.

Zarauz was then given command of the San Fulgencio, on board which he participated at the defence of Ferrol in 1800. At the end on 1801 he was given command of the Ferroleña, setting sail for Lima. Anchored at Manila, he was given orders by General Álava to set sail for China to buy flour for the fleet, with 850,000 pesos in cash. Caught up in a typhoon, the ship was smashed against the rocks off the coast of Guangzhou. Promoted to captain, and back in Spain, in 1806, he was appointed military commander of Ferrol.

== Peninsular War ==
When French troops occupied the city, Zarauz was able to escape to Cadiz.

=== Cantabrian Expedition ===
Zarauz was appointed commander-in-chief of the joint Anglo-Spanish landing operation to establish a base at Santoña, in Cantabria, then in the hands of the French, from which to free the western part of the coast of the Cantabrian Sea of French troops and then move on to Guetaria, freeing up the central and eastern coast of the region, thereby cutting off Irun as the main gateway for French supplies to Spain. The landing party consisted of 1,200 Spanish troops, under Field Marshal Renovales and 800 British Marines. (Note: The British squadron of four frigates and a brig-sloop was commanded by Mends, on board the HMS Arethusa (1781). The other British ships were HMS Medusa, HMS Narcissus (1801), HMS Amazon (1799) and the brig-sloop HMS Port Mahon (1798), most of which had participated some months earlier in a similar, but more modest joint Anglo-Spanish expedition, on that occasion led by Mends.)

The expedition left La Coruña on 14 October 1810, with Zarauz on board the flagship Santa María Magdalena, with Blas Salcedo y Salcedo as captain. Although the expedition had some initial success in capturing the important port of Gijón, in Asturias, as they were anchored in the bay of Santoña in preparation for the landing operation a sudden gale forced ships to head out to sea on 23 October, the Magdalena and the Palomo cutting their anchor cables.

The squadron then headed back to Viveiro, where a hurricane caused the Magdalena to founder and the Palomo to be smashed against the rocks. (Note: Of the 75 men on board the Palomo, 50 perished in the storm, while the remaining 25, including their captain, managed to reach the shore. (González Fernández.)) Of the 508 people on board the Magdalena, 500 perished in the storm, including her captain, Salcedo, and Zarauz. Of the eight that managed to reach shore, five later died of their injuries.
