= Skipsey =

Skipsey is a surname. Notable people with the surname include:

- Joseph Skipsey (1832–1903), English poet
- William Skipsey (died 1846), Royal Navy officer
