= Spanish frigate Santa María Magdalena =

Spanish frigate built at Ferrol, Galicia in 1773

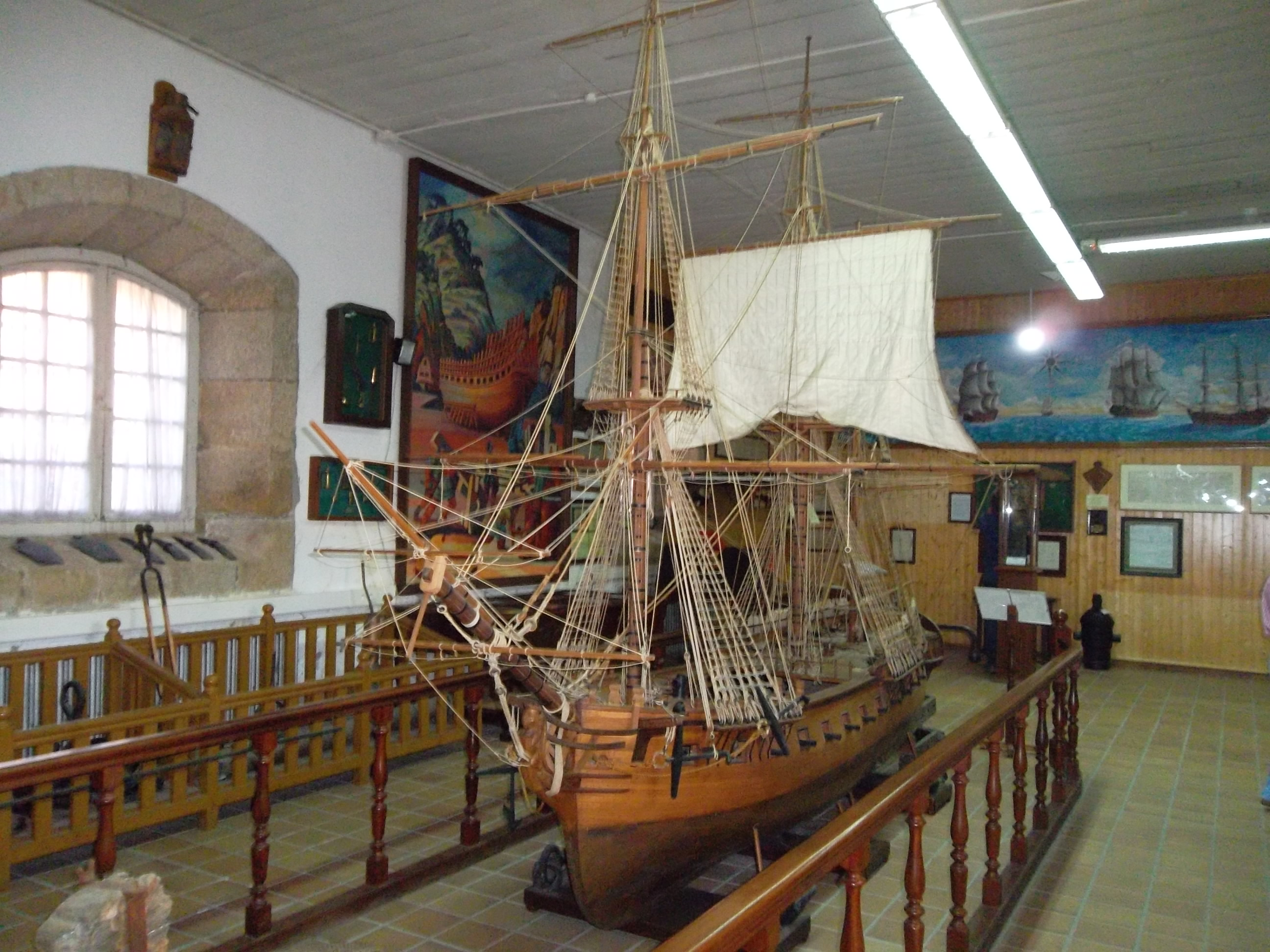
- 1/14 scale model of the Santa María Magdalena at Spain's National Exhibition of Ship Building in Ferrol, Spain

History

Spain
- Name: Santa María Magdalena
- Launched: 1773
- Fate: Sunk

General characteristics
- Type: 38-gun frigate
- Displacement: 500 tonnes
- Length: 41 m (134 ft 6 in)
- Beam: 10 m (32 ft 10 in)
- Propulsion: Sail
- Armament: 38 guns

Santa María Magdalena was a 38-gun Spanish frigate built at Ferrol, Galicia in 1773. She sank, together with another ship, the Palomo, (Note: Of the 75 men on board the Palomo, also part of the Cantabrian Expedition, 50 perished in the storm, while the remaining 25, including their captain, managed to reach the shore. (González Fernández.)) in a storm off the coast of Galicia, Spain, 31 October/2 November 1810. Of the 508 people on board, 500 perished in the storm, including her captain, Blas Salcedo y Salcedo, and the commander-in-chief of the Expedition, Joaquín Zarauz. Of the eight that managed to reach shore, five later died of their injuries.

Captain Salcedo's body was later found embracing that of his son, who had also perished in the storm. As a result, a Royal Order (Orden Real) was issued prohibiting fathers and sons or brothers and brothers being part of the crew on the same ship.

The wreck of the Magdalena lies just off the beach of Covas (Viveiro), in Lugo.

== Construction ==
Magdalena was built at the Royal Dockyards of Esteiro at Ferrol, Galicia in 1773.

== Service history ==
At the start of the Anglo-Spanish War, José Caro Sureda, younger brother of Pedro Caro y Sureda, Marquis of La Romana, was given command of the Magdalena, sailing from Cádiz in April 1805 as part of the Spanish squadron led by Federico Gravina, headed for Martinique where, at the Battle of Diamond Rock, a large combined Franco-Spanish fleet (Note: The commander of the French fleet was Pierre de Villeneuve.) was able to oust the British garrison the following month.

=== Peninsular War ===
==== Cantabrian Expedition ====
As part of a plan to establish a base from which to free the western part of the coast of the Cantabrian Sea of French troops and then move on to Guetaria to free up the central and eastern coast of the region, thus cutting Irun off as a port of entry for French supplies to Spain, the Anglo-Spanish squadron, under the command of Joaquín Zarauz, and made up of five frigates, two brigantines and several smaller vessels, plus a landing force of two thousand troops, sailed from La Coruña on 14 October 1810, and headed for Santoña, then in the hands of the French.

=== Sinking ===
Having lost its main anchor at Santoña, as had the Paloma, the Magdalena crashed into HMS Narcissus managed to free herself from the Magdalena headed out to sea. However, the main mast of the Magdalena broke and in its fall made several holes in the hull, while the wind pushed the ship further towards the beach. At the same time, the Palomo was also pushed towards the nearby cliffs and was destroyed.

== TV documentary ==
In 2020, Spain's RTVE produced a 48-minute documentary about the wreck of the Magdalena.

== Bibliography ==
- Winfield, Rif; Tredrea, John M; García-Torralba Pérez, Enrique & Blasco Felip, Manuel (2023). Spanish Warships in the Age of Sail 1700—1860: Design, Construction, Careers and Fates. Seaforth Publishing. ISBN 978-1-5267-9078-1.
