= Pringle Stokes =

British naval officer (1793–1828)

- Born: 23 April 1793; Surrey, England
- Died: 12 August 1828 (aged 35); Puerto del Hambre (Port Famine), Patagonia, Chile
- Occupation: Naval officer
- Known for: Command of HMS Beagle

Pringle Stokes (23 April 1793 – 12 August 1828) was a British naval officer who served in HMS Owen Glendower on a voyage around Cape Horn to the Pacific coast of South America, and on the West African coast fighting the African slave trade.

He then commanded HMS Beagle on its first voyage of exploration in the south Atlantic. After two years in command of the Beagle, depressed by the harsh winter conditions of the Strait of Magellan, he committed suicide.

== Early career ==
Pringle Stokes was born on 23 April 1793, son of Charles and Elizabeth Stokes. He was baptized at Chertsey on 2 May 1793. At the age of twelve, on 5 June 1805 he joined the Royal Navy as a midshipman in HMS Ariadne. (Note: The 20-gun Ariadne came into service in 1776. It was rebuilt in 1792 to carry 24 guns, and decommissioned in 1814.)

Stokes served as a lieutenant on board the frigate HMS Owen Glendower, which left England for South America in November 1819. Robert FitzRoy, who was to take command of the Beagle after Stokes died, also served on the Owen Glendower on this voyage. He had joined the ship as a college volunteer in 1819, aged fourteen. The young FitzRoy and Stokes, who was in his late twenties, would have become acquainted on the two-year voyage. The Owen Glendower visited Saint Helena in October 1820 to report on the conditions in which the former Emperor Napoleon was being held. Spencer commanded the ship on its journey round Cape Horn to Valparaíso in Chile, arriving in January 1821. The ship remained in Pacific waters off Chile and Peru until October 1821, when it sailed from Valparaiso, rounded the Horn again in rough weather, and returned to England via Rio de Janeiro, arriving in January 1822.

In November 1822 Captain Sir Robert Mends took command of the Owen Glendower as senior officer on the west coast of Africa, charged with suppressing the West African slave trade. In one incident Stokes was wounded in a clash between the boat crews of the Owen Glendower and the local people of Fernando Po. On 3 July 1823 he led a party of boats up the New Calabar River, where they found an abandoned schooner that had been loaded with slaves but now only held seven in irons. The schooner was wrecked when the pilot ran it aground two days later. The Chief of New Calabar River sent the schooner's cargo of 184 slaves out to the Owen Glendower, which took them as far as Cape Coast before landing them.

Sir Robert Mends died at Cape Coast on 4 September 1823. Stokes temporarily took command of the ship. Hearing of the death of Sir Robert Mends, Commander John Filmore, who had recently arrived on the African Station, appointed himself to command the station and transferred to the Owen Glendower. Stokes returned to England. In 1824 Stokes was involved in a dispute over the Spanish slaving schooner Fabiana, which had been captured by the ship's boats under Lieutenant Gray on the Bonny River ten days after Sir Robert Mends died. The opposing view, which apparently prevailed, was that the ship's boats had been dispatched under the orders of Sir Robert Mends, whose estate would be entitled to the prize money. In May 1824 Stokes was promoted to commander.

== Beagle voyage ==
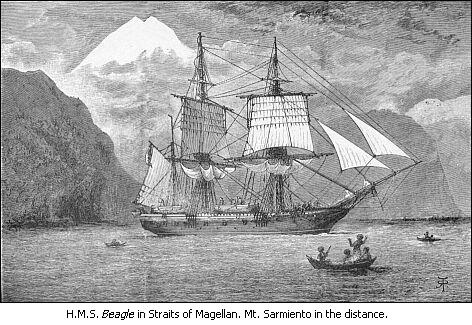
HMS Beagle in the Strait of Magellan, with Monte Sarmiento in Chilean Tierra del Fuego in the background

The Beagle was built in 1819 in Woolwich. She was a relatively small ship of 235 tons, barque-rigged. Pringle Stokes commissioned her around the end of 1825. It was said of Stokes when he was appointed to command the Beagle "though he was not practised in professional science, he had been studying in Edinburgh to attain mathematics, and he was moreover an indomitable seaman."

On 22 May 1826 the Beagle left Plymouth along with the larger HMS Adventure under the overall command of Captain Phillip Parker King on a voyage of exploration of the southern coast of South America. The two ships were to chart the coasts between Montevideo and Chiloé Island, with particular attention to the complex of channels and islands around Tierra del Fuego.

The two ships left Montevideo on 19 November 1826, and surveyed the coasts of southern Patagonia and Tierra del Fuego around the Strait of Magellan until April 1827, returning to Rio Janeiro in June 1827. Stokes entered the Santa Cruz River and recorded the Isla Pavón, about 54 kilometres (34 mi) from the river's mouth. Pringle Stokes was objective in the way in which he described the Fuegians whom he first met in 1827, unusually for a European of his time. He blamed their primitive condition on the rigors of the climate. In December that year the two ships sailed south again, this time accompanied by a schooner named Adelaide, and in January 1828 made their base at Port Famine (Puerto del Hambre). From there, Stokes was directed to "proceed to survey the western coasts, between the Strait of Magalhaens and latitude 47° south, or as much of those dangerous and exposed shores as he could examine". He was to return to Port Famine by the end of July.

Conditions were extremely difficult. The narrow rocky channels were uncharted. There were racing tides, storms and blizzards, and overcast skies or fog that made astronomical observations impossible. Describing a difficult time in January 1828, a member of the expedition said:

Neither was Capt. Stokes of a disposition to lay quietly under Cape Providence waiting for fair weather; he was none of your "fair weather Jacks;" but with a resolution and energy hardly to be surpassed, he boldly and fearlessly braved the difficulties which thickened around him; trusting to himself, and having confidence in the skill and seamanship of Lieut. Scholl and the other officers, he vainly endeavored to reach the western entrance, and was constantly driven back, exposed as we were to the heavy swell of the great Pacific, which rolled in upon us with unabated violence ... on the morning of the 31st January the wind howling around us, and the atmosphere dense and cheerless, we put to sea. During the day we tacked nearly thirty times, and when within ten miles of Westminster Island, the wind blew with redoubled violence. The evening began to close in: still we dashed on and still were driven back; the sea broke over the vessel many times, and she laboured very much, and oftentimes was buried in the deep trough of the sea...

== Suicide ==
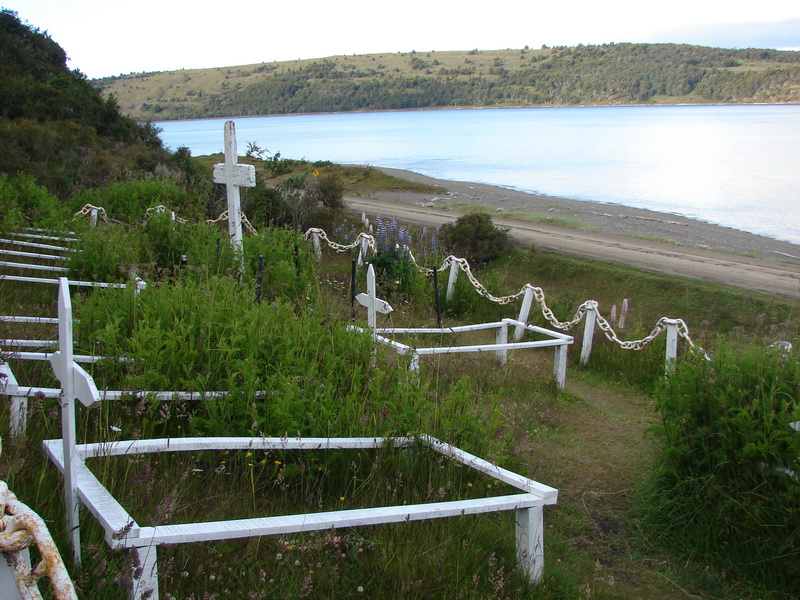
Grave of Stokes in Punta Santa Ana

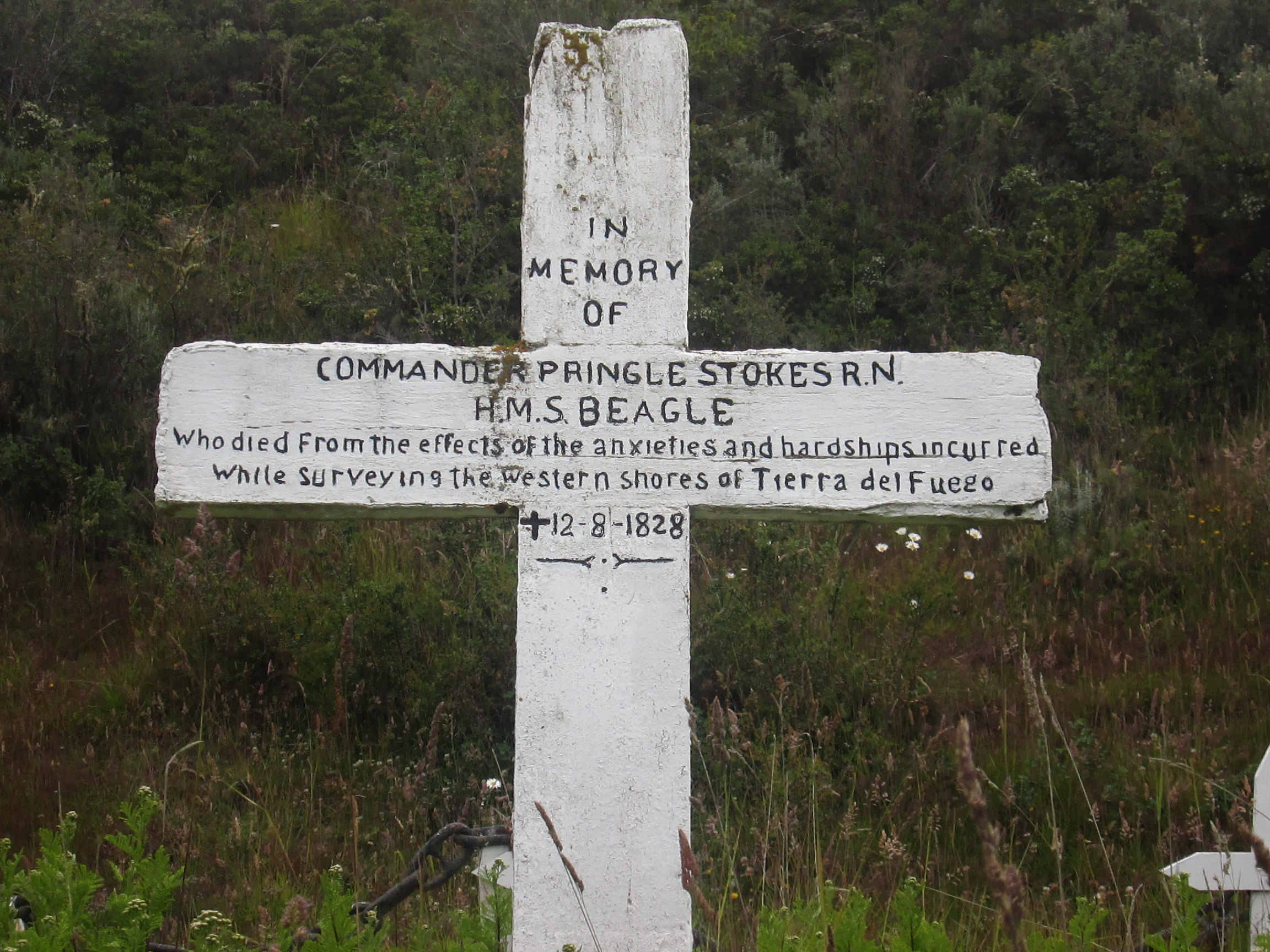
Grave of Pringle Stokes

After two years of stressful and dangerous work, Stokes became increasingly depressed. In June 1828 he wrote in his journal:

Nothing could be more dreary than the scene around us. The lofty, bleak, and barren heights that surround the inhospitable shores of this inlet, were covered, even low down their sides, with dense clouds, upon which the fierce squalls that assailed us beat, without causing any change... Around us, and some of them distant no more than two-thirds of a cable's length, were rocky inlets, lashed by a tremendous surf; and, as if to complete the dreariness and utter desolation of the scene, even the birds seemed to shun its neighbourhood. The weather was that in which... "the soul of man dies in him." (Note: The phrase "the soul of man dies in him" is taken from the Scottish poet James Thomson (1700–1748).)

When the ship returned to Port Famine on 27 July 1828, Stokes had not left his cabin for four weeks. Lieutenant William Skyring, the assistant surveyor, had in effect taken command. On 1 August 1828 Stokes shot himself. The bullet remained within his skull, but Stokes remained conscious and coherent. Gangrene set in, and Stokes finally died on 12 August 1828. William Skyring commanded the Beagle on its voyage to Montevideo for repairs. When it arrived there Robert FitzRoy, flag lieutenant of HMS Ganges, was given command. FitzRoy commanded the Beagle on its celebrated second voyage from 1831 to 1836, with the young naturalist Charles Darwin on board. The observations Darwin made contributed to his subsequent development of his theory of natural selection. Many years later, FitzRoy also suffered from depression, and committed suicide in 1865.

Pringle Stokes was buried at the "English Cemetery", two miles from Port Famine. His gravestone is now displayed in the Museo Salesiano in Punta Arenas, about 40 miles (64 km) distant. Captain Phillip Parker King used Stokes' journal in preparing his official report of the voyage, but glossed over the suicide. In 2009 the State Library of New South Wales bought the remainder of Stokes' handwritten journal (parts had been eaten by rats) for AU$200,000.

== Notes and references ==
Notes

Citations

Sources

- Beals, Herbert Kyle (2007). Four travel journals: the Americas, Antarctica and Africa, 1775-1874. Ashgate. ISBN 978-0-904180-90-9.
- British and Foreign State Papers. H.M. Stationery Office. 1825. p. 493.
- Brown, Anthony Gary; White, Colin (30 July 2006). The Patrick O'Brian Muster Book: Persons, Animals, Ships and Cannon in the Aubrey-Maturin Sea Novels. McFarland. ISBN 978-0-7864-2482-5.
- Cannon, Richard (1837). Historical Record of the Life Guards: Containing an Account of the Formation of the Corps in the Year 1660 and of Its Subsequent Services to 1835. Adjutant General's Office, Horse Guards. p. 675.
- Great Britain. Foreign Office (1846). British and foreign state papers. H.M.S.O. p. 96.
- Gregory, Desmond (1996). Napoleon's Jailer: Lt. Gen. Sir Hudson Lowe : a Life. Fairleigh Dickinson Univ Press. ISBN 978-0-8386-3657-2.
- Gribbin, John R.; Gribbin, Mary (1 August 2004). Fitzroy: The Remarkable Story Of Darwin's Captain And The Invention Of The Weather Forecast. Yale University Press. p. 24. ISBN 978-0-300-10361-8.
- Haigh, Samuel (1831). Sketches of Buenos Ayres, Chile, and Peru. Effingham Wilson. p. 314.
- Hill, J. R.; Ranft, Bryan (1995). The Oxford Illustrated History of the Royal Navy. Oxford University Press. ISBN 978-0-19-860527-0.
- "Isla Pavón". Patagonia database.
- Keynes, Richard (17 April 2003). Fossils, Finches, and Fuegians:Darwin's Adventures and Discoveries on the Beagle: Darwin's Adventures and Discoveries on the Beagle. Oxford University Press. ISBN 978-0-19-516649-1.
- King, P. P. (1839). FitzRoy, Robert (ed.). Narrative of the surveying voyages of His Majesty's Ships Adventure and Beagle between the years 1826 and 1836, describing their examination of the southern shores of South America, and the Beagle's circumnavigation of the globe. Proceedings of the first expedition, 1826–30, under the command of Captain P. Parker King, R.N., F.R.S. Vol. I. London: Henry Colburn.
- Marshall, John (1830). Royal Naval Biography Supplement: Or, Memoirs of the Services of All the Flag-Officers, Superannuated Rear-Admirals, Retired-Captains, Post-Captains, and Commanders. Cambridge University Press. ISBN 978-1-108-02275-0.
- Marshall, John (1831). Royal Naval Biography : Or, Memoirs of the Services of All the Flag-officers, Superannuated Rear-admirals, Retired-captains, Post-captains, and Commanders, Whose Names Appeared on the Admiralty List of Sea Officers at the Commencement of the Present Year, Or who Have Since Been Promoted, Illustrated by a Series of Historical and Explanatory Notes ... with Copious Addenda: Captains. Commanders. Longman, Hurst, Rees, Orme, and Brown. p. 210.
- Meacham, Steve (27 June 2009). "Forgotten death at sea stoked Darwin's success". Sydney Morning Herald.
- Moss, Chris (2008). Patagonia: A Cultural History. The Journey to Mei. ISBN 978-1-904955-38-2.
- Nelson, Richard William (23 July 2009). Darwin, Then and Now: The Most Amazing Story in the History of Science. iUniverse. ISBN 978-0-595-51375-8.
- Nichols, Peter (29 June 2004). Evolution's Captain. HarperCollins. p. 4. ISBN 978-0-06-008878-1.
- O'Brien, Donat Henchy (1839). My adventures during the late war: comprising a narrative of shipwreck, captivity, escapes from French prisons, etc, from 1804-1827. H. Colburn. p. 341.
- Pollock, Arthur William Alsager (1841). The United Service Magazine. H. Colburn.
- Schultz, Duane P.; Schultz, Sydney Ellen (15 March 2007). A History of Modern Psychology. Cengage Learning. p. 152. ISBN 978-0-495-09799-0.
- Stephen, James (1826). England Enslaved by her own Slave Colonies.
- Stokes, John Lort (1846). Discoveries in Australia. T. and W. Boone. p. 3.
- Taylor, James (1 October 2008). The voyage of the Beagle: Darwin's extraordinary adventure aboard FitzRoy's famous survey ship. Naval Institute Press. ISBN 978-1-59114-920-0.
- The New Monthly Magazine. 1824. p. 231.
- Winfield, Rif (2007). British Warships in the Age of Sail 1793–1817: Design, Construction, Careers and Fates. Seaforth. ISBN 978-1-86176-246-7.
