= Hood Hanway Christian =

Rear-Admiral Hood Hanway Christian
- Born: 23 July 1784; Hook Norton, Oxfordshire, England
- Died: 31 July 1849 (aged 65); Ryde, Isle of Wight, England
- Military career
- Allegiance: Great Britain; United Kingdom
- Branch: Royal Navy
- Service years: 1792–1849
- Rank: Rear-Admiral
- Commands: Cape of Good Hope Station
- Conflicts: French Revolutionary Wars; Napoleonic Wars

Rear-Admiral Hood Hanway Christian (23 July 1784 – 31 August 1849) was a British naval officer who reached the rank of Rear-Admiral. He fought in several naval engagements during the Napoleonic Wars between 1800 and 1814. Later he was Commodore of the naval squadron based on the Cape of Good Hope.

== Early years ==
Hood Hanway Christian was born at Hook Norton, Oxfordshire, England on 23 July 1784, son of Admiral Sir Hugh Cloberry Christian and Anne Leigh. He was commissioned as a Royal Naval officer around 1792, at the age of eight. He commanded a division of boats at the Siege of Genoa on 25 January 1800, and for this was promoted to Lieutenant.

== First commands ==
In October 1804 he was made an Acting Captain for his service in the Bay of Bengal. He commanded the Arrogant from January to March 1805. On 21 March 1805 he was promoted to Commander. He commanded the Sir Edward Hughes from April 1805 to January 1806. On 30 January 1806 he was made Captain at the age of twenty two.

On 29 February 1808 Christian married Harriet Shute, daughter of Samuel Shute, in Bath Abbey. They had three daughters and four sons. Their oldest son, Thomas Hompesch Christian (1810 - 1858), also joined the navy and reached the rank of commander.

Christian commanded HMS Heroine (formerly Venus) from March to November 1809. In this 32-gun frigate he participated in the reduction of Flushing in 1809 during the Walcheren Campaign. The Heroine was part of a squadron of ten frigates under the command of Captain Lord William Stuart. On 11 August 1809 this squadron sailed up the Western Scheldt under a light wind, suffering minor damage from the shore batteries of Flushing and Cadzand. Two men were wounded on the Heroine. On 13 August seven 74-gun line-of-battle ships under Rear-Admiral Sir Richard Strachan entered the river and began an intense bombardment of Flushing that lasted until the town surrendered on 15 August.

Christian was Captain of the Iris from May 1811 to 1813. This 38-gun ship was part of the squadron that assisted Spanish patriots on the north coast of Spain in 1811 and 1812. In 1813 he captured three American ships sailing under letters of marque: the 12-gun Union and the 6-gun Cashier and Price. The American schooner Price was captured on 15 April 1813, and the prize money was shared by agreement with the captain and crew of HMS Surveillante. With the defeat of Napoleon in 1814, Christian disappears from the records for the next decade.

== Commodore and Admiral ==
In 1824 John Filmore, acting Captain of HMS Owen Glendower and captain of the African Station, resigned due to debilitating fever and returned to England. On 16 September 1824 Christian was appointed Captain of the 42-gun Owen Glendower, and sailed in that frigate to South Africa where he took up his post as commander-in-chief of the Cape of Good Hope Station. A collection of his papers held at the National Maritime Museum, Greenwich is mostly concerned with his activities on that station. It includes correspondence with his captains, Charles Richard Dyke Ackland on HMS Helicon and Sir David Dunn on HMS Samarang, with the Governor of Mauritius, General Sir Galbraith Lowry Cole, and with the Lieutenant-Governor of Eastern Cape of Good Hope, Sir Richard Bourke.

In 1826 Christian impounded the Portuguese merchant ship Gratidao, leading to a court case and much correspondence. While he was Commodore the British were attempting to establish a settlement at Mombasa, and were negotiating a treaty with King Radama I of Madagascar to suppress the slave trade. His correspondence also covers these activities.

On 28 June 1838 Christian was appointed Rear-Admiral of the White. He died on 31 August 1849 at Ryde on the Isle of Wight.

== Notes and references ==
Citations

Sources

- "Christian, Hood Hanway, Rear-Admiral Of The White, 1784-1849". Royal Museums Greenwich.
- "Hood Hanway Christian". Three Decks.
- Jackson, John, Prize Agent (22 February 1814). "Notice of prize money". London Gazette.
- James, William (1826). The naval history of Great Britain, from ... 1793, to ... 1820, with an account of the origin and increase of the British navy.
- Lundy, Darryl (5 November 2007). "Person Page - 15543". The Peerage.
- Marshall, John (1827). Royal Naval Biography Supplement: Or, Memoirs of the Services of All the Flag-Officers, Superannuated Rear-Admirals, Retired-Captains, Post-Captains, and Commanders. Cambridge University Press. ISBN 978-1-108-02272-9.
- Pollock, Arthur William Alsager (1839). The United Service Magazine. H. Colburn.

Military offices
Preceded by Robert Moorsom	Commander-in-Chief, Cape of Good Hope Station; 1825–1827	Succeeded by William Skipsey
