= John Filmore =

Royal Navy captain

Captain John Filmore
- Born: c. 1788
- Died: 24 May 1839; Plymouth, England
- Occupation: Naval officer
- Known for: Command of African Station

John Filmore (c. 1788 – 24 May 1839) was an officer in the British Navy who commanded the African Station for a year, responsible for suppressing the slave trade.

== Early years ==
John Filmore was born around 1788. He joined the navy as a boy, enlisting as a midshipman on HMS Sirius under Captain William Prowse, in which he fought in the Battle of Trafalgar in 1805. During that battle he was sent on board one of the disabled ships that had been captured, taking charge of the vessel. He was made a Lieutenant on 16 January 1808. He soon became First Lieutenant of HMS Crocodile under Captain E.H. Columbine, assigned to the African station. In an expedition of 1809 against Senegal he served under Columbine on the frigate HMS Solebay. When Columbine died in 1811 he assumed command of the Crocodile. Filmore was appointed Commander with seniority as of 18 June 1811. In the summer of 1822 he was appointed to the Ordinary at Plymouth.

== African station ==
Filmore was sent again to the African station to command HMS Bann, a sloop of war. He was appointed to this command on 30 May 1823. Sir Robert Mends, Commodore of the African Station, died at Cape Coast on 4 September 1823, and Lieutenant Pringle Stokes took charge of the ship. Filmore arrived as a passenger on the Swinger gun-brig in October 1823. On hearing of the death of the commodore Filmore appointed himself to command the station and transferred to the frigate Owen Glendower. Stokes returned to England.

On 4 December 1823 Captain Percy Grace, who had been the senior commander on the African Station, returned from a long cruise in the Cape Verde Islands and received an order from the Admiralty, sent to him by Filmore, ordering him to return to England. Grace decided not to dispute the order, and after a stormy passage reached England on 7 February 1824.

In 1824 Filmore was made acting Captain of the Owen Glendower pending the appointment of his replacement, Captain Hood Hanway Christian, in September. After twelve months, debilitated by fever, he resigned and returned to England.

== Later years ==
The Admiralty did not confirm Filmore and promote him to Captain until August 1824, after his return to England. He never fully recovered from the illness. Filmore wife, Kate, died in London in 1837. Filmore died on 24 May 1839 at the age of 50.

== Notes and references ==
Citations

Sources

- British and Foreign State Papers. H.M. Stationery Office. 1825. p. 493.
- Great Britain. Admiralty (1814). The Navy List. H.M. Stationery Office. p. 3.
- Marshall, John (1831a). "Filmore, John" . Royal Naval Biography. Vol. 3, part 1. London: Longman and Company. p. 184.
- Marshall, John (1831b). "Grace, Percy" . Royal Naval Biography. Vol. 3, part 1. London: Longman and Company. p. 210.
- Phillips, Michael (2007a). "CYRENE".
- Phillips, Michael (2007b). "OWEN GLENDOWER".
- Pollock, Arthur William Alsager (1839). The United Service Magazine. H. Colburn.
- The Gentleman's Magazine (London, England). F. Jefferies. 1839.
- The Nautical Magazine: A Journal of Papers on Subjects Connected with Maritime Affairs. Brown, Son and Ferguson. 1837.
