= William Skipsey =

British Royal Navy officer (1756–1846)

Rear-Admiral William Skipsey
- Died: 1846
- Military career
- Allegiance: United Kingdom
- Branch: Royal Navy
- Service years: 1769–1828
- Rank: Rear-Admiral
- Commands: HMS Hector; HMS Centurion; HMS Maidstone; HMS Leander; Cape of Good Hope Station
- Conflicts: Anglo-French War; Fourth Anglo-Dutch War; French Revolutionary Wars

Rear-Admiral William Skipsey (died 18 March 1846) was a Royal Navy officer who became commander-in-chief of the Cape of Good Hope Station.

== Naval career ==
Skipsey joined the Royal Navy in August 1769. He saw action at the Battle of Ushant in July 1778 during the Anglo-French War, at the Battle of Dogger Bank in August 1781 during the Fourth Anglo-Dutch War and at the capture of Saint Lucia in 1795 during the French Revolutionary Wars. Promoted to captain in June 1801, he was given command of the third-rate HMS Hector in March 1802, of the fourth-rate HMS Centurion in May 1813 and of the fifth-rate HMS Maidstone in August 1814 before taking command of the fourth-rate HMS Leander in August 1815. He became commander-in-chief of the Cape of Good Hope Station in 1827 before retiring in 1828.

== Sources ==
- O'Byrne, William Richard (1849). "Skipsey, William" . A Naval Biographical Dictionary . John Murray – via Wikisource.

Military offices
Preceded by Hood Hanway Christian	Commander-in-Chief, Cape of Good Hope Station; 1827–1828	Succeeded by Charles Schomberg
