= Fuentenovilla =

Fuentenovilla, Spain
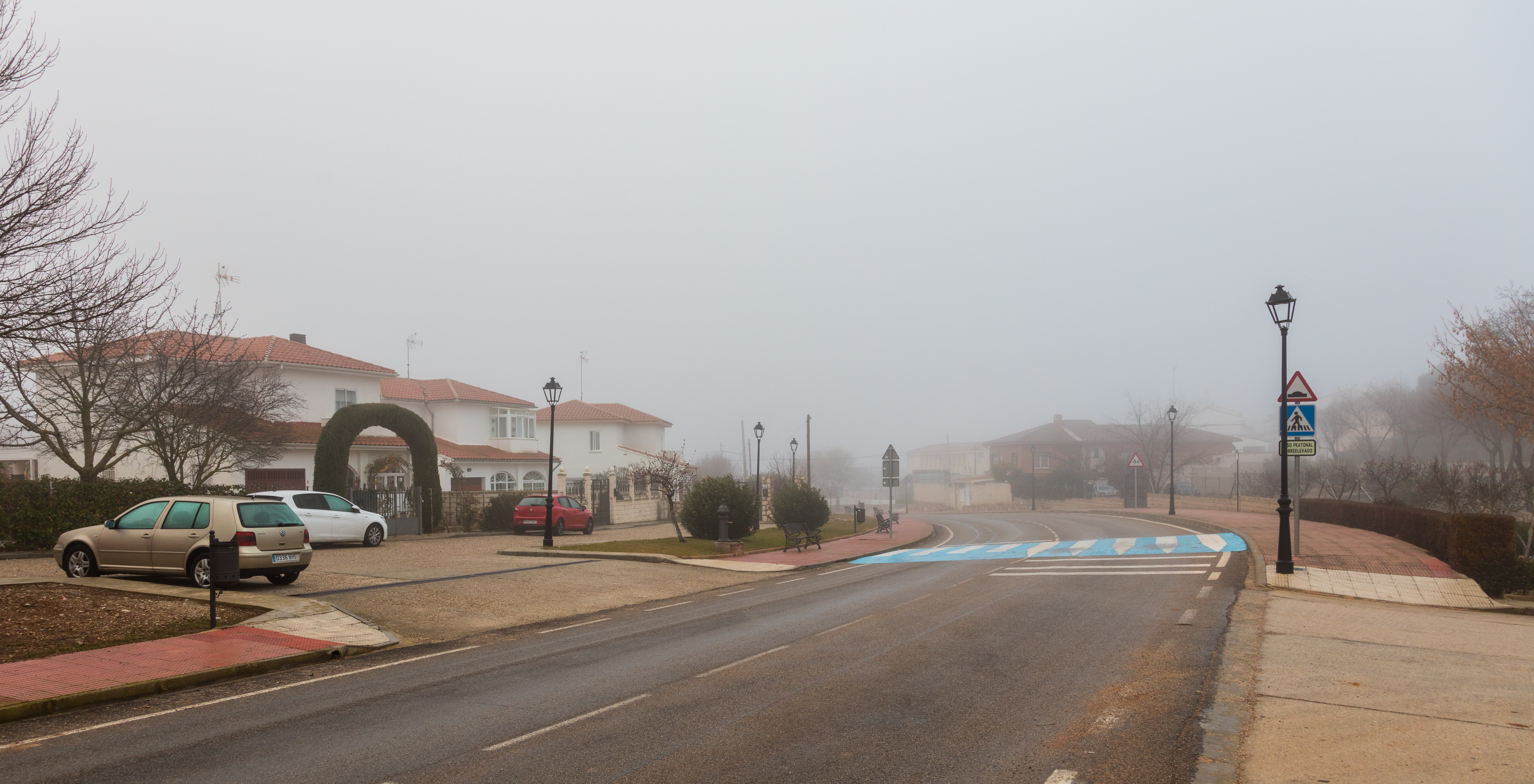

- Coat of arms

- Location within Province of Guadalajara Location within Castilla-La Mancha Location within Spain
- Country: Spain
- Autonomous community: Castile-La Mancha
- Province: Guadalajara
- Municipality: Fuentenovilla

Area
  - Total: 99 km^{2} (38 sq mi)

Population (2025-01-01)
  - Total: 621
  - Density: 6.3/km^{2} (16/sq mi)
- Time zone: UTC+1 (CET)
  - Summer (DST): UTC+2 (CEST)

Fuentenovilla is a municipality located in the province of Guadalajara, Castile-La Mancha, Spain. According to the 2004 census (INE), the municipality has a population of 342 inhabitants.
