= Robert Mends =

Captain Sir Robert Mends
- Born: c. 1767; Pembrokeshire
- Died: 4 September 1823; HMS Owen Glendower, off the Gold Coast
- Military career
- Allegiance: United Kingdom
- Branch: Royal Navy
- Service years: 1779–1823
- Rank: Royal Navy Captain
- Conflicts: American Revolutionary War; Battle of Cape St Vincent; Great Siege of Gibraltar; Battle of Cape Henry; Siege of Yorktown; Battle of Dominica; French Revolutionary Wars; Siege of Toulon; Battle of Groix; Napoleonic Wars; Action of 6 April 1809; Peninsular War
- Awards: Spanish Knight of the Order of Charles III

Captain Sir Robert Mends (c. 1767 – 4 September 1823) was a British Royal Navy officer of the late eighteenth and early nineteenth century, who lost an arm in the American War of Independence, caught in an explosion at the Battle of Groix in 1795 and wounded again at the action of 6 April 1809. In 1815 he was made a Spanish knight for his services in the Peninsular War and was awarded a pension of £300 a year from the British government. He remained in service at the end of the Napoleonic Wars and in 1821 was made commodore on the West African station, on which he died in 1823.

== Life ==
Robert Mends was born into a prominent Pembrokeshire family in the late 1760s, probably 1767. He joined the Royal Navy in 1779, serving on HMS Culloden under Captain George Balfour during the American War of Independence. Mends was almost instantly in action, Culloden fighting at the Battle of Cape St Vincent and at the Great Siege of Gibraltar in 1780. The following year, Mends joined the frigate HMS Guadeloupe and was in action at the Battle of Cape Henry in March 1781 before participating in the Siege of Yorktown. During the fighting, Guadeloupe was destroyed and Mends wounded in the right arm and left knee. Although his leg wound healed, Mends' arm had to be amputated. He was awarded a pension of £7 a year to compensate for his lost limb.

Recovering from his wounds, Mends joined HMS Conqueror and fought at the Battle of Dominica, where he was again seriously wounded after being struck in the head by a wooden splinter. Mends remained in service at the end of the war and joined HMS Grampus in 1786, under Commodore Edward Thompson off the African coast. In 1789 he was promoted to lieutenant and spent time on the brig HMS Childers in the English Channel. At the outbreak of the French Revolutionary Wars in 1793, Mends was serving on the ship of the line HMS Colossus in the Mediterranean and was present at the Siege of Toulon. In 1795, Colossus joined the Channel Fleet and fought at the Battle of Groix, at which Mends was caught in a large explosion that left him very badly burned.

Recovering from his injuries, Mends was promoted commander and took charge of the 16-gun brig HMS Diligence in the West Indies. In May 1800 he was made a post captain and served in a number of ships, including HMS Abergavenny, HMS Thunderer, HMS Quebec and HMS Nereide, before the Peace of Amiens in 1802. After the outbreak of the Napoleonic Wars in 1803, Mends was made commander of the Dublin sea fencibles and in 1808 given command of the frigate HMS Arethusa in the Bay of Biscay. With Arethusa, Mends served on the blockade of the Northern Spanish ports during the Peninsular War and also fought at the action of 6 April 1809, in which Mends was wounded again.

Between 1808 and 1811, Mends operated extensively against French-held harbours and coastal shipping on the Northern Spanish coast. Commanding a small English squadron in the area, his operations, including the Cantabrian Expedition (1810), were a serious nuisance to the French and he was consequently thanked by the Spanish Junta and made a nominal Spanish major general.

Between 1811 and 1814, Mends was recalled to Britain and served as superintendent of the prison hulks in Portsmouth harbour. In 1815, at the end of the Napoleonic Wars, Mends was made a knight of the Spanish Order of Charles III, a title he was permitted to wear in British service, but which did not grant him the privileges of a British knight. The following year his pension was increased to £300 a year. In 1821, Mends became commander-in-chief of the West African Station in the frigate HMS Iphigenia, later transferring to HMS Owen Glendower.

Mends died in September 1823, succumbing to fever on Owen Glendower off the Gold Coast. Lieutenant Pringle Stokes took charge of the ship. Commander John Filmore arrived soon after, appointed himself to command the station and transferred to the frigate Owen Glendower. Mends' eldest son died three months later on the same commission at Sierra Leone. Mends had married in 1802 and had two other sons, Captain James Augustus Mends, who died in 1875 and Vice-Admiral George Clarke Mends who died in 1885. His younger brother, William Bowen Mends, also joined the Navy and died as a full admiral in 1864, while his nephew Admiral Sir William Robert Mends died in 1897.

== See also ==
- O'Byrne, William Richard (1849). "Mends, George Clarke" . A Naval Biographical Dictionary . John Murray – via Wikisource.
