= HMS Narcissus (1801) =

Frigate of the Royal Navy

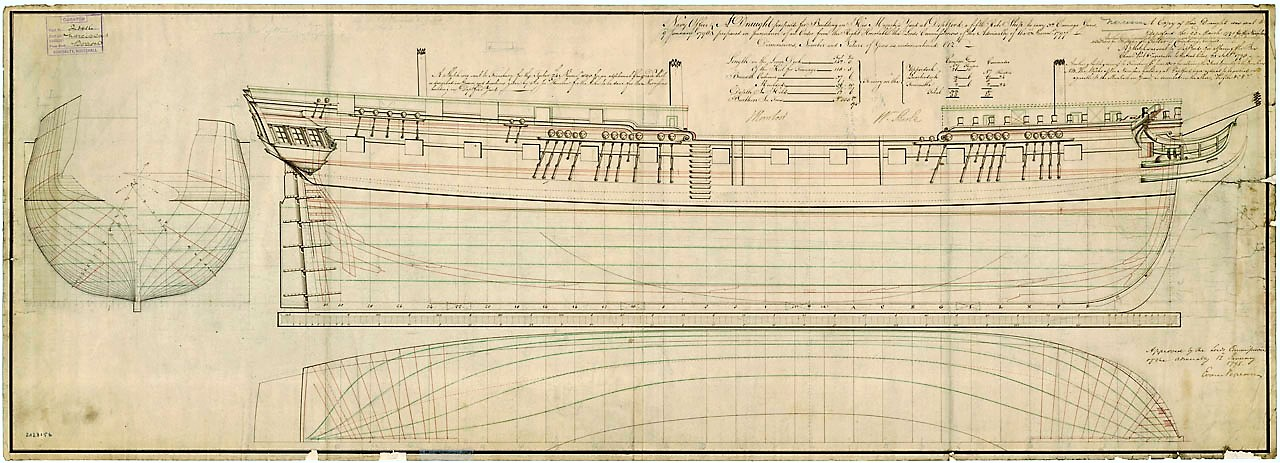
- Plan of the Narcissus

History

United Kingdom
- Name: Narcissus
- Builder: King's Yard at Deptford
- Laid down: 1 January 1799
- Launched: 25 August 1801
- Fate: Broken up 1837

General characteristics
- Class & type: Narcissus-class frigate
- Tons burthen: 90890/94 (bm)
- Length: Overall: 142 ft 5 3/4 in (43.4 m); Keel: 118 ft 11 1/8 in (36.2 m)
- Beam: 37 ft 10 7/8 in (11.6 m)
- Depth of hold: 12 ft 6 in (3.8 m)
- Complement: 254
- Armament: Upper deck: 26 × 18-pounder guns; QD: 2 × 9-pounder guns + 8 × 24-pounder carronades; Fc: 2 × 9-pounder guns + 2 × 24-pounder carronades

HMS Narcissus was a 32-gun Narcissus-class fifth-rate frigate of the Royal Navy. The lead ship of her class, she was launched in 1801 and participated in the War of 1812.

== Career ==
Narcissus was stationed in the Mediterranean in 1802 under Captain Ross Donnelly; assisting with the evacuation of Alexandria 12 March 1803. In May 1803, Lord Nelson was named Commander and Chief of the Mediterranean and arrived off Toulon on 8 July 1803. On 7 July, the French naval brig Alcyon, was chased by Narcissus near Sardinia. Alcyon, after a pursuit of 22 hours and an exchange, struck her flag. She was taken into service with the Royal Navy as HMS Halcyon.

Much of the next six months, the Narcissus supported the blockade of the French fleet at Toulon. On 15 May 1804 at Malta she removed 3 men from the U.S. prize vessel Madona Catapoliana, the men claiming to be English. In July 1804, in a sanguinary encounter, close to a dozen enemy settees in Hyères Bay were destroyed (one captured) by ten boatloads of marines and sailors from Narcissus, HMS Seahorse, and HMS Maidstone. She arrived at Algiers on 1 September.

In late 1805, Narcissus joined a squadron under the command of Commodore Sir Home Popham. This squadron was part of a force dispatched to take the Cape of Good Hope from the Dutch.

On her way to the Cape, on 30 October, Narcissus recaptured Horatio Nelson and the French privateer Prudent, which had captured Horatio Nelson. The action took place off Cape Mount (Liberia). In his letter, Captain Ross Donnelly of Narcissus described how he had come to capture the two vessels with the assistance of the slave ship Columbus. Donnelly had Columbus take Horatio Nelson to Cape Massarida, where her late captain and part of her crew were. The privateer Prudent was armed with four 12 and eight 6-pounder guns, and had a crew of 70 men. A report in Lloyd's List (LL) stated that Narcissus had come into Saint Helena after having captured the French privateer Prudent (or Prudente) and recaptured the Liverpool slave ship Horatio. Narcissus reportedly had sent Horatio on her voyage. (Note: A later notice describes Horatio as weighing 300 tons and armed with 22 guns. She was carrying rum, tobacco, slaves, and ivory. She was returned to Cape Mansarada, where the French had landed her master. The salvage money notice for the recapture of Horatio reported that the share for a seaman was £1 3s 10d.)

Proceeding to Table Bay to rendezvous with Popham’s force, Narcissus drove the French privateer Napoleon ashore near the Cape of Good Hope on 25 December 1805; some wreckage still exists at Olifantsbos Point. Narcissus did not reconnect with the squadron prior to the Battle of Blaauwberg. After the surrender of the cape, the squadron captured the French naval brig Rolla on 21 February 1806 in Table Bay. On 4 March, Narcissus and HMS Raisonnable chased the French Navy frigate, Volontaire into Table Bay where she struck without firing a shot. Both the Rolla and Volontaire would enter service as Royal Navy vessels.

Narcissus next sailed to South America. The Spanish ship Nostra Senora del Buen Viage was captured on 8 June 1806 by Narcissus. Royal Marines and sailors from Narcissus, as part of a squadron-wide "marine battalion"; joined the 71st Highlanders and a small regiment from Saint Helena to capture Buenos Aires on 25 June. In July, Narcissus sailed for England loaded with captured Spanish silver and currency worth over one million dollars. Many of the Royal Marines who had arrived in Buenos Aires with Narcissus, had been left to garrison the city's fortress and were captured 14 August 1806 at La Reconquista de Buenos Aires. They were marched deep to the country's interior and spent a year as prisoners; not returning to England until January 1808.

In April 1809, Narcissus was a part of a British squadron, off the Saintes, West Indies, which chased a French squadron, and captured the French 74-gun D'Hautpoul, of 1871 tons. D'Hautpoul afterward served in the Royal Navy under the name HMS Abercrombie. On 2 November 1810, Narcissus collided with the Spanish Navy frigate Santa Maria Magdalena. As a result of the damage she sustained in the collision, Santa Maria Magdalena subsequently was driven ashore and wrecked at the Ria de Vivero.

On 25 November 1812 Narcissus was off Navassa Island where her boats captured the schooner Joseph and Mary, Captain William Wescott, of 139 tons (bm). She had been launched in Queen Anne's County, Maryland, and had been commissioned as a privateer on 12 September 1812. Joseph and Mary was armed with four guns and had a crew of 73 men. Narcissus chased her for three hours. As Narcissus's boats approached, the men on Joseph and Mary fired on them, killing one man and wounding another. Joseph and Mary surrendered the moment the men on the boats prepared to board. There were three wounded men aboard her. Before her capture, Joseph and Mary had recaptured the American ship Piscataqua, which subsequently bilged, and a schooner that she sold in Haiti. On 26 November 1812 Narcissus arrived at Port Royal, Jamaica.

On 1 January 1813 Narcissus captured the brig Viper and the schooner Shepherd. Shepherd, of 134 tons (bm), Captain Robert Hart, had a crew of 18 men and was armed with two 6-pounder and two 4-pounder guns. Narcissus captured her off Cape St Blare. (Note: Shepherd was built at Matthews County, Virginia, in 1807. She had been commissioned on 18 December 1812.)

On 10 June 1813 Narcissus slipped into Chesapeake Bay under the cover of darkness and attacked the USRC Surveyor. A Royal Navy boarding party of approximately 65 sailors and marines closed on Surveyor in small boats with muffled oars to conceal their approach. British forces navigated away from the cutter's six-pound deck guns and boarded the ship. A fierce effort by Surveyor's crew to repel British boarders followed, described by British Lt John Crerie as one in which "her deck was disputed inch-by-inch" in a "gallant and desperate" defense. During the engagement, Royal Marine Captain Thomas Ford was mortally wounded by Surveyor's captain, Samuel Travis, in a cutlass duel. However, as the Americans were outnumbered more than two-to-one Travis ultimately ordered the ship to strike her colours. In tribute to the ferocity of Surveyor's resistance, Crerie returned Travis' sword to him and he was paroled at Washington, North Carolina on 7 August 1813; the rest of the captured crew were transferred to a British prisoner-of-war camp in Halifax, Nova Scotia.

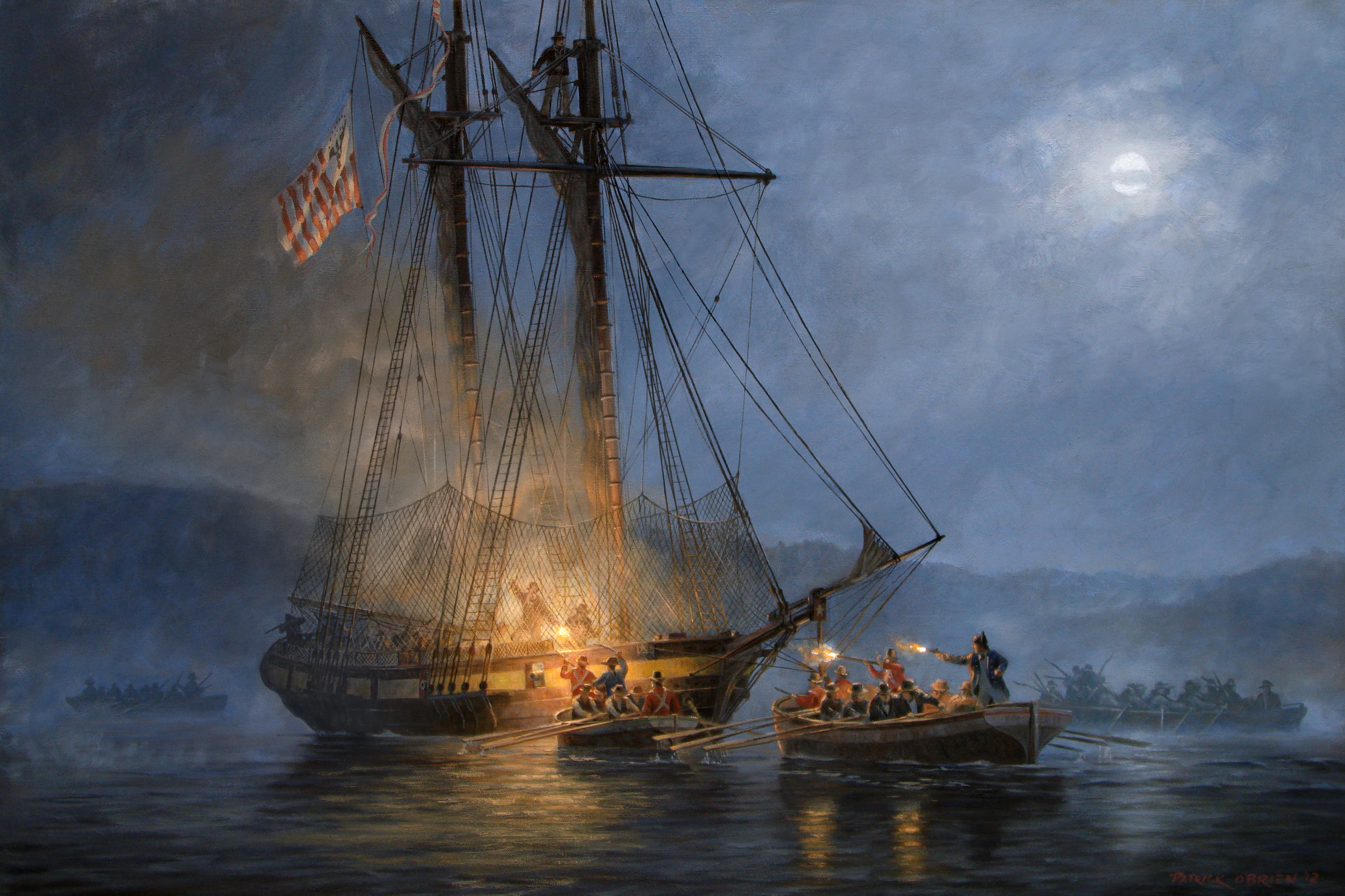
Painting of the capture of Surveyor by Narcissus

On 13 July 1814 Narcissus captured Governor Shelby, Captain John H. Hall, was a letter of marque schooner of 184 tons (bm), built at Queen Anne's County, Maryland, in 1812 and commissioned on 11 December 1813. She was armed with three 4-pounder guns and had a crew of 11 men. (Note: Head money was paid on 13 August 1816. A first-class share was worth £12 19s 5d; a sixth-class share, that of an ordinary seaman, was worth 2s 0½d.)

On 9 October 1814 Narcissus was contacted by HMS Dispatch, which requested support in taking the USRC Eagle, which had run aground in Long Island Sound. Upon returning to the site of Eagle, Narcissus and Dispatch found that the damaged Eagle had been re-floated. Eagle retreated and was beached and her crew moved to the shore to direct musket fire against British barges attempting to attach tow cables to the wrecked hulk. By noon on 13 October, the Royal Navy had managed to take Eagle under tow and she was captured.

Narcissus remained in North America for a year after the war. On 4 April 1816 she departed Halifax for Bermuda. On 14 April she departed Bermuda, and arrived at Portsmouth on 2 May 1816. She was ordered to sail up the Thames, to be paid off, arriving at Gravesend on 7 May 1816.

== Fate ==
Narcissus was used as a convict ship from December 1823 until she was sold for breaking up in January 1837.
