= Santoña =

- Municipality
- Santoña

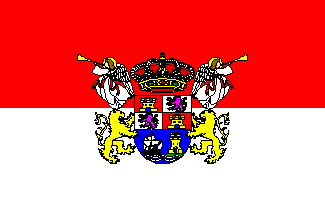
- Flag Coat of arms

- Location of Santoña

- Location in Spain
- Coordinates: 43°26′29″N 3°27′27″W
- Country: Spain
- Autonomous community: Cantabria
- Province: Cantabria
- Comarca: Trasmiera
- Judicial district: Santoña
- Capital: Santoña

Government
  - Alcaldesa: María Puerto Gallego Arriola (2007) (PSC-PSOE)

Area
  - Total: 11.53 km^{2} (4.45 sq mi)
- Elevation: 7 m (23 ft)
- Highest elevation: 315 m (1,033 ft)
- Lowest elevation: 0 m (0 ft)

Population (2025-01-01)
  - Total: 10,835
  - Density: 939.7/km^{2} (2,434/sq mi)
- Demonym: santoñés/a
- Time zone: UTC+1 (CET)
  - Summer (DST): UTC+2 (CEST)
- Postal code: 39740
- Official language(s): Spanish
- Website: Official website

Santoña is a town in the eastern coast of the autonomous community of Cantabria, on the north coast of Spain. It is situated by the bay of the same name. It is 45 kilometres (28 mi) from the capital Santander. Santoña is divided into two zones, an urban plain, and a mountainous area, with Mount Buciero at its eastern limit, and Brusco and the beach of Berria to the north. The beach of San Martin comprises its south limit and the fishing harbor and marsh area its western limit.

In August 1719 the town was successfully attacked and captured by French forces supported by the British Royal Navy during the War of the Quadruple Alliance. Extensive naval supplies were seized or destroyed, and along with the Duke of Berwick's simultaneous taking of San Sebastian, put pressure of Philip V to make peace which he subsequently did at the Treaty of The Hague.

== Population centres ==
- Santoña, the main town, where most of the population lives.
- Dueso, 174 inhabitants in 2008. Location of the Penal de El Dueso prison.
- Piedrahíta, 173 inhabitants in 2008.

== Notable people ==
- Juan de la Cosa (1460-1509), cartographer, conquistador, and explorer
- Tomás de Teresa, 800m athlete
- Luis Carrero Blanco, Spanish Navy officer and politician, who served as Prime Minister of Spain
- Osmar Ibáñez, footballer

== Trivia ==
The song "Santonian shores" of the band Eluveitie is about this region.

== Gallery ==
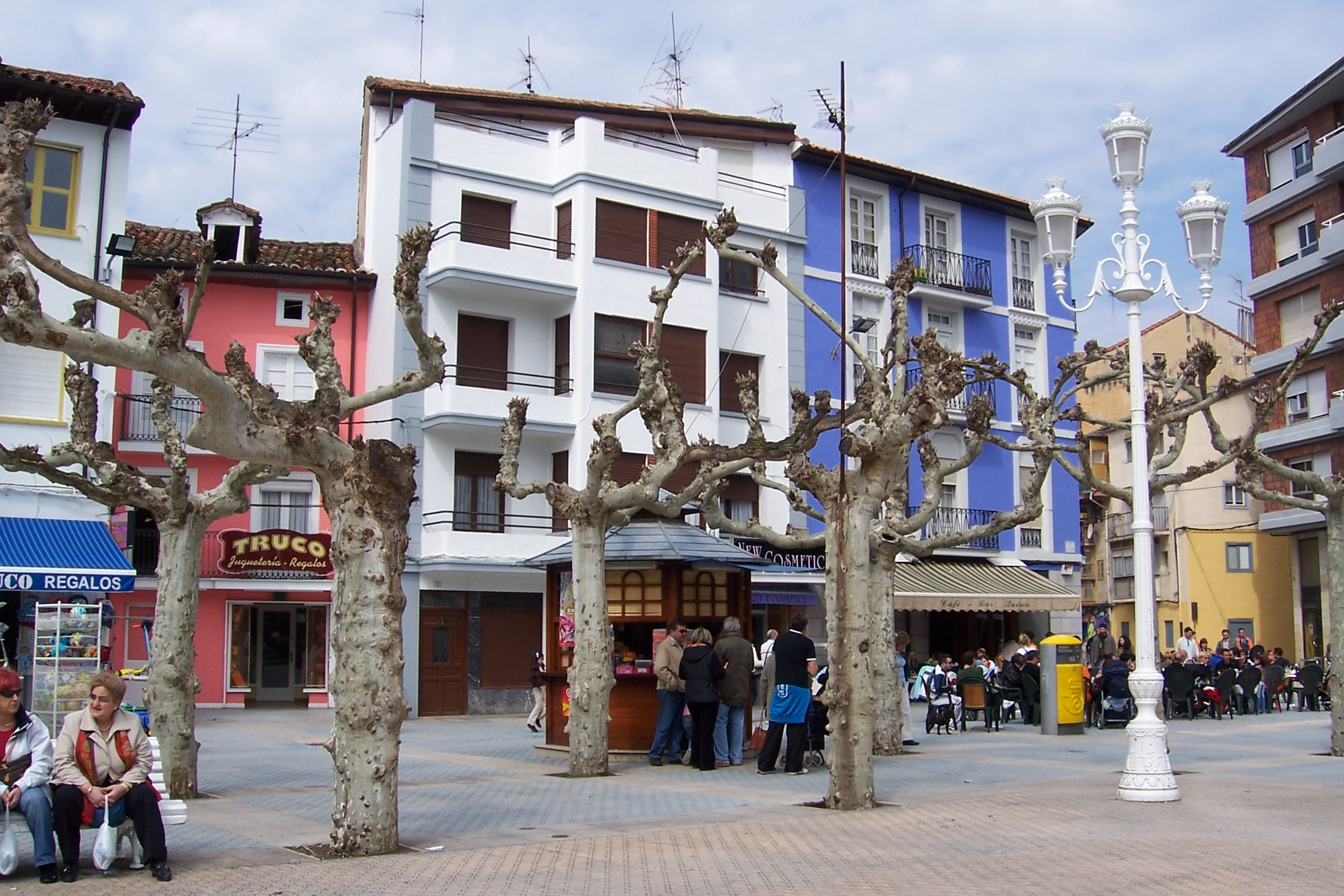
Plaza de San Antonio

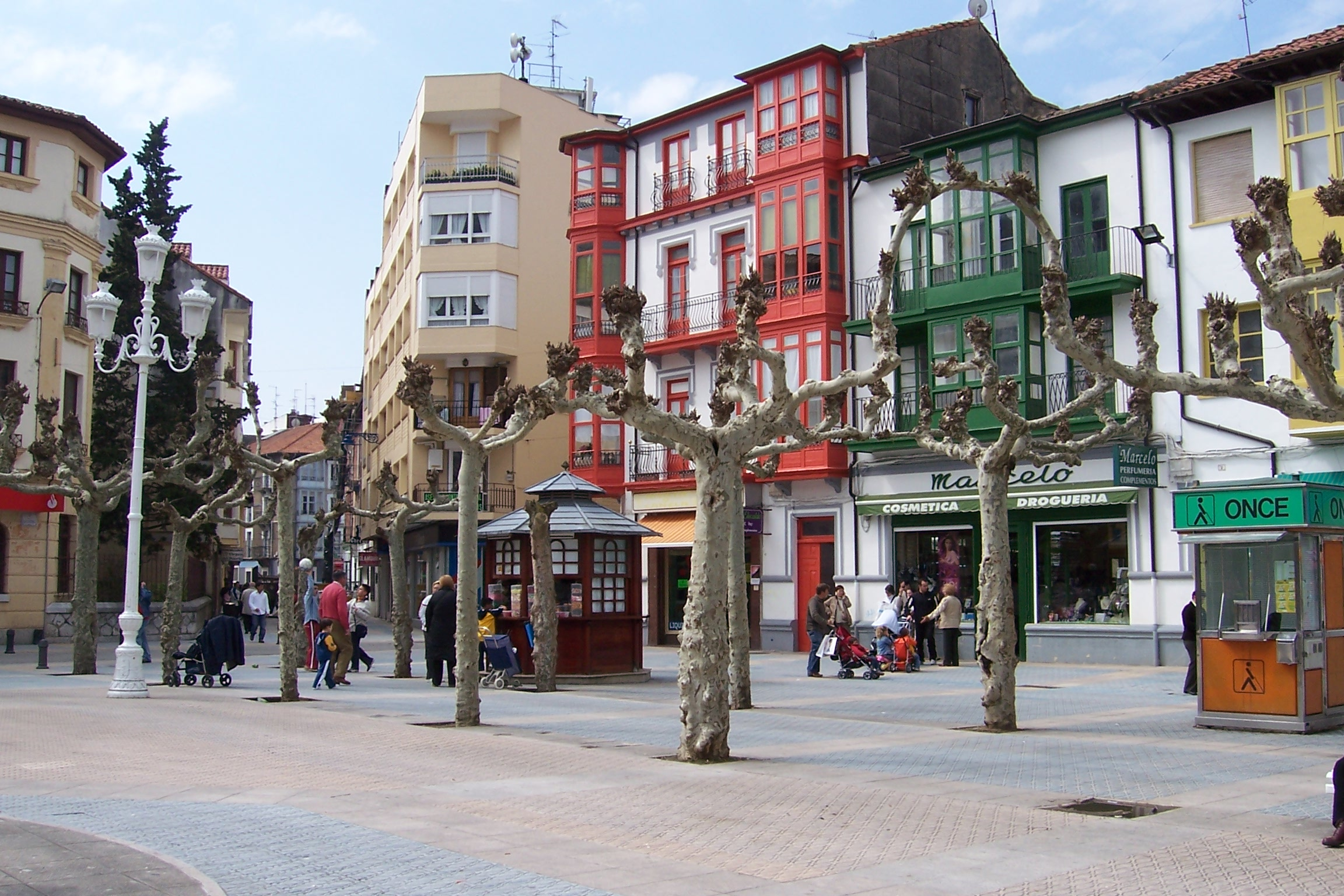
San Felipe street

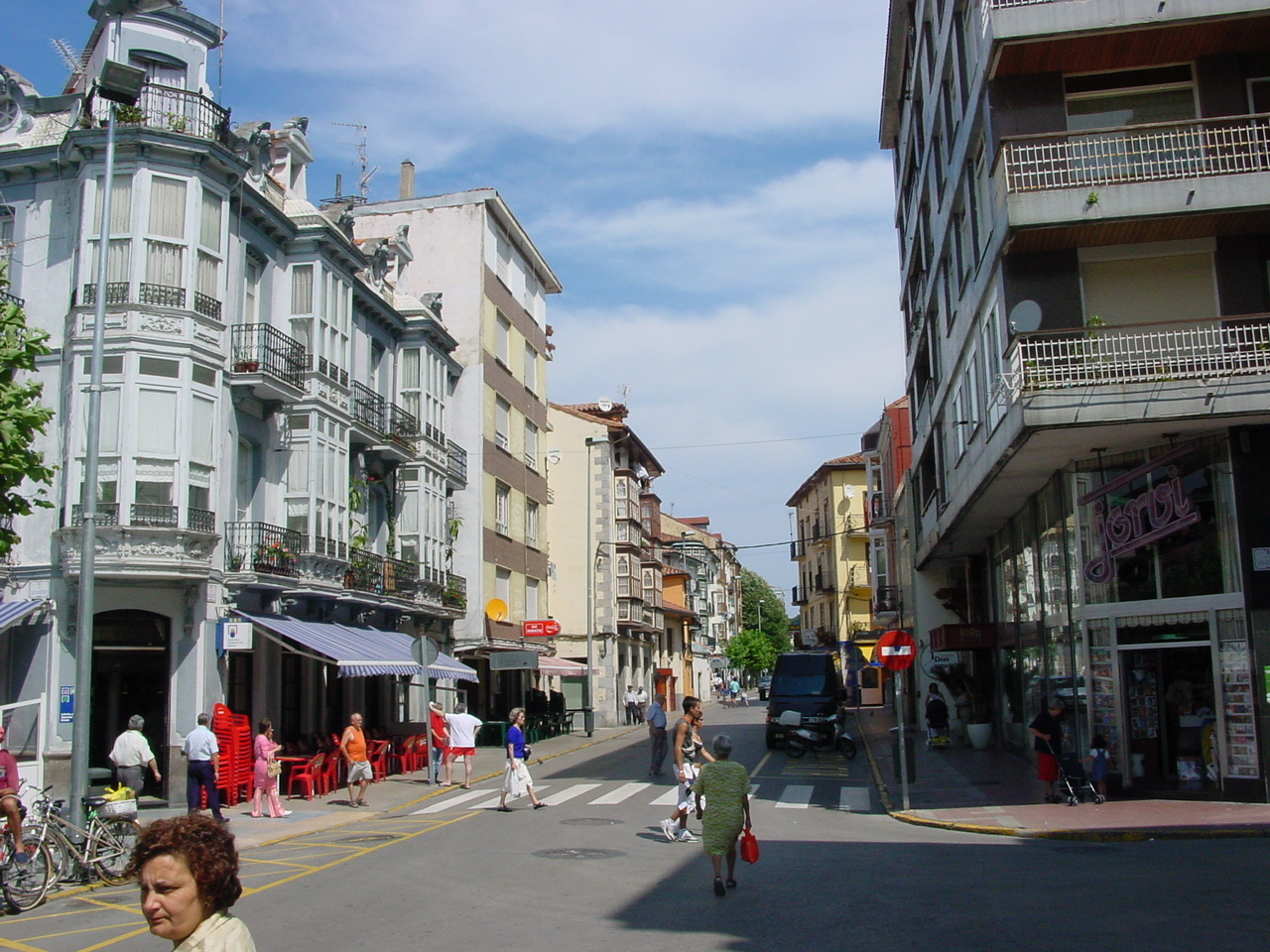
Manzanedo street

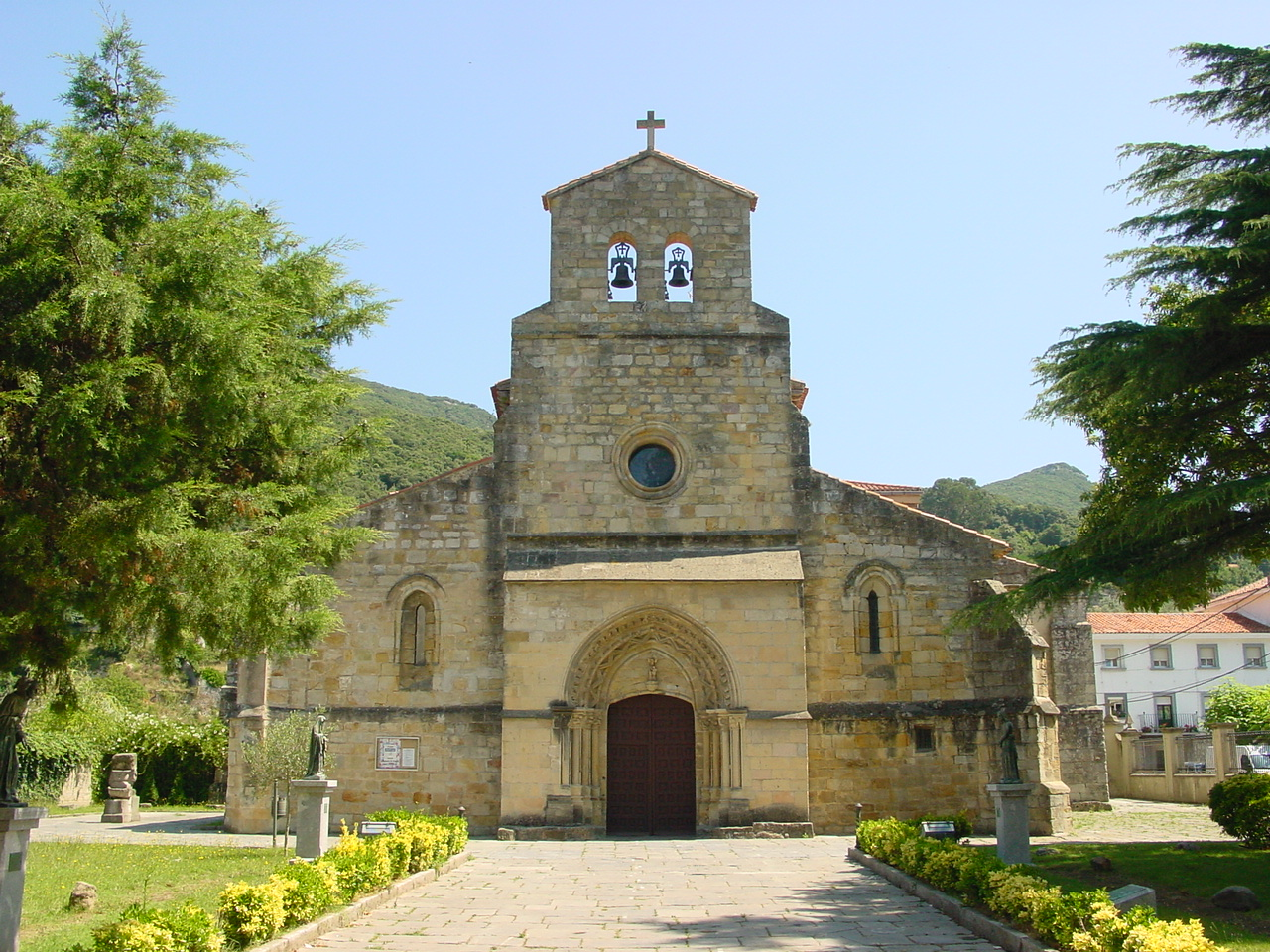
Santa María del Puerto, 13th century.

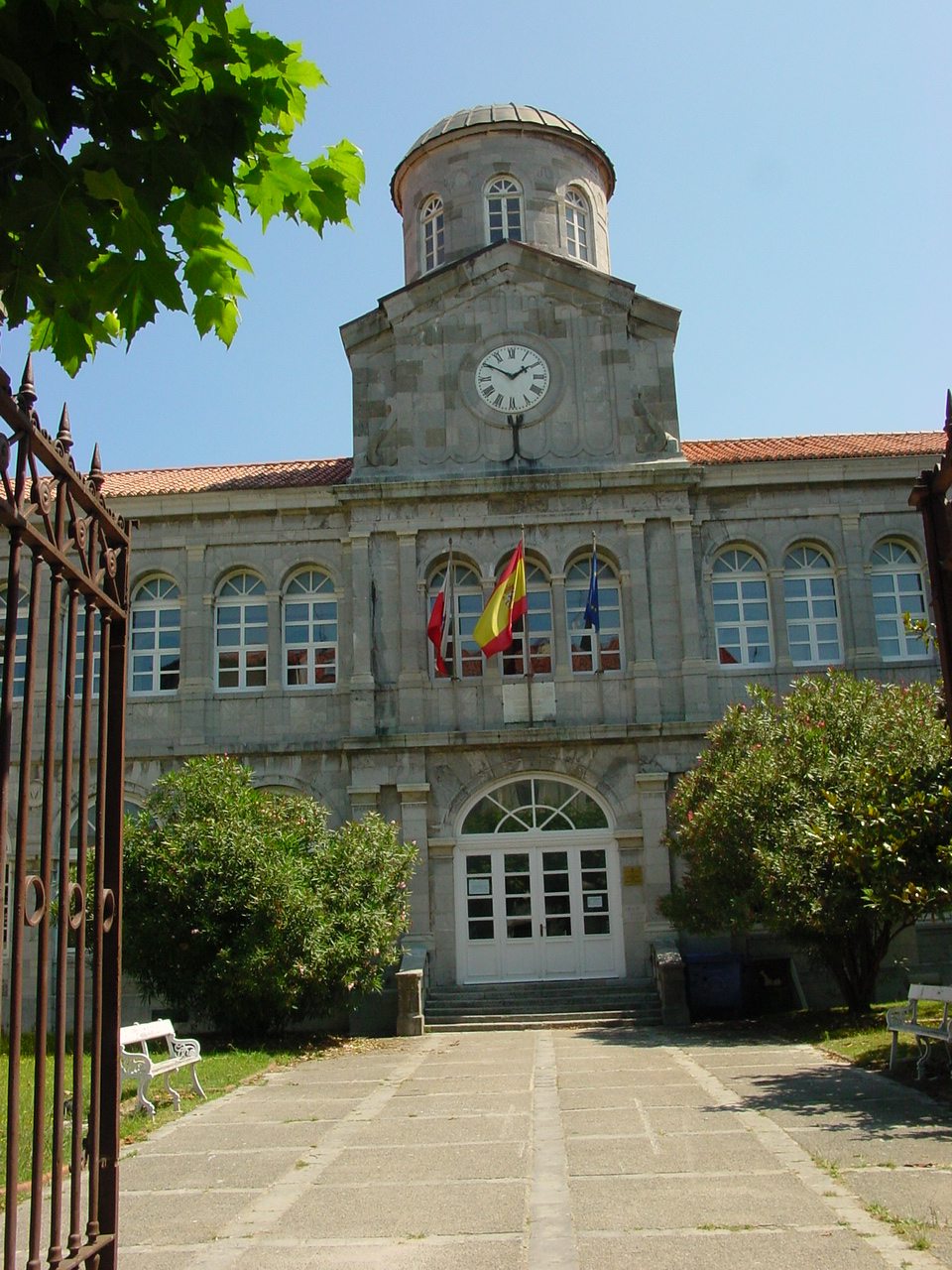
Manzanedo Secondary School

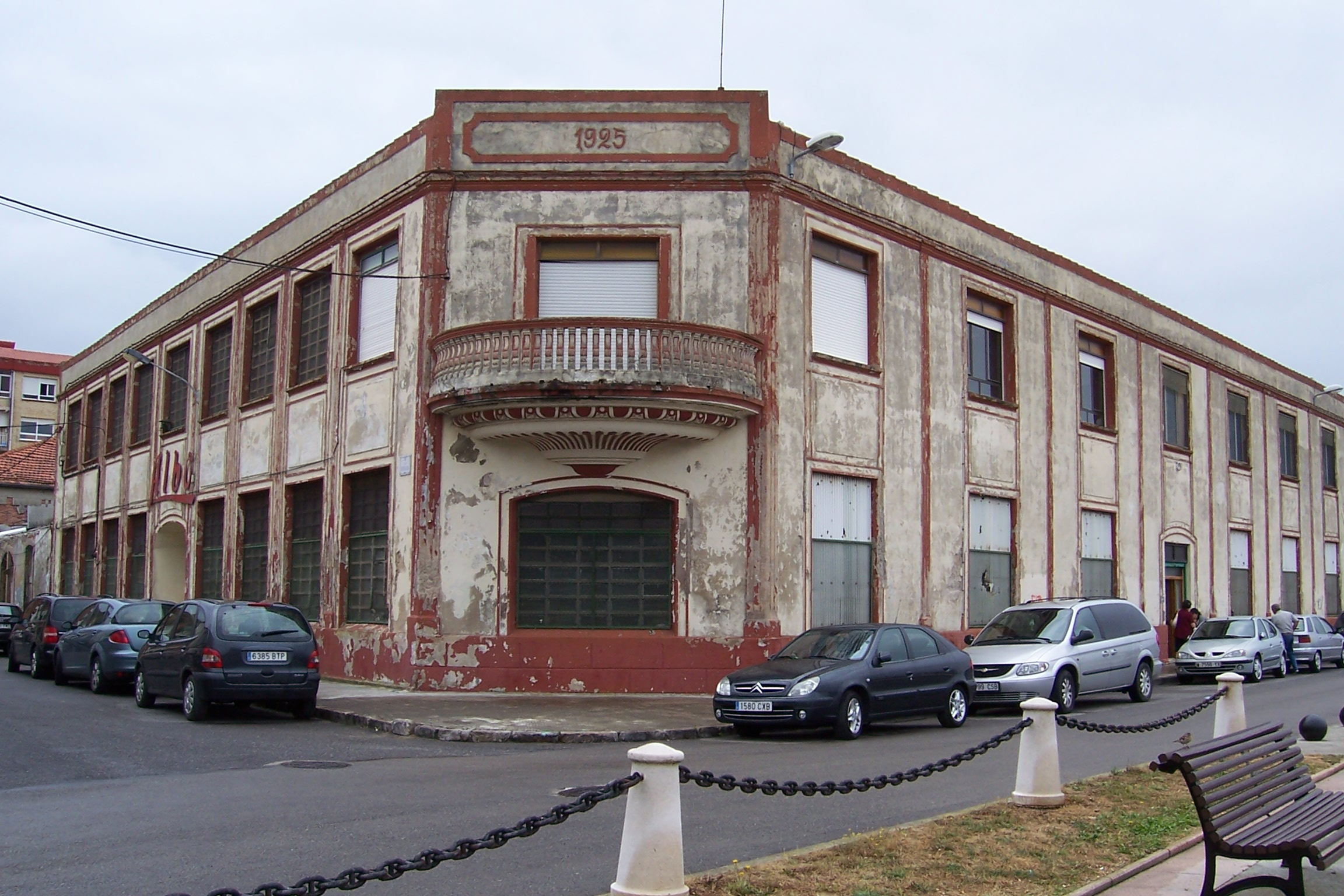
Former Albo cannery

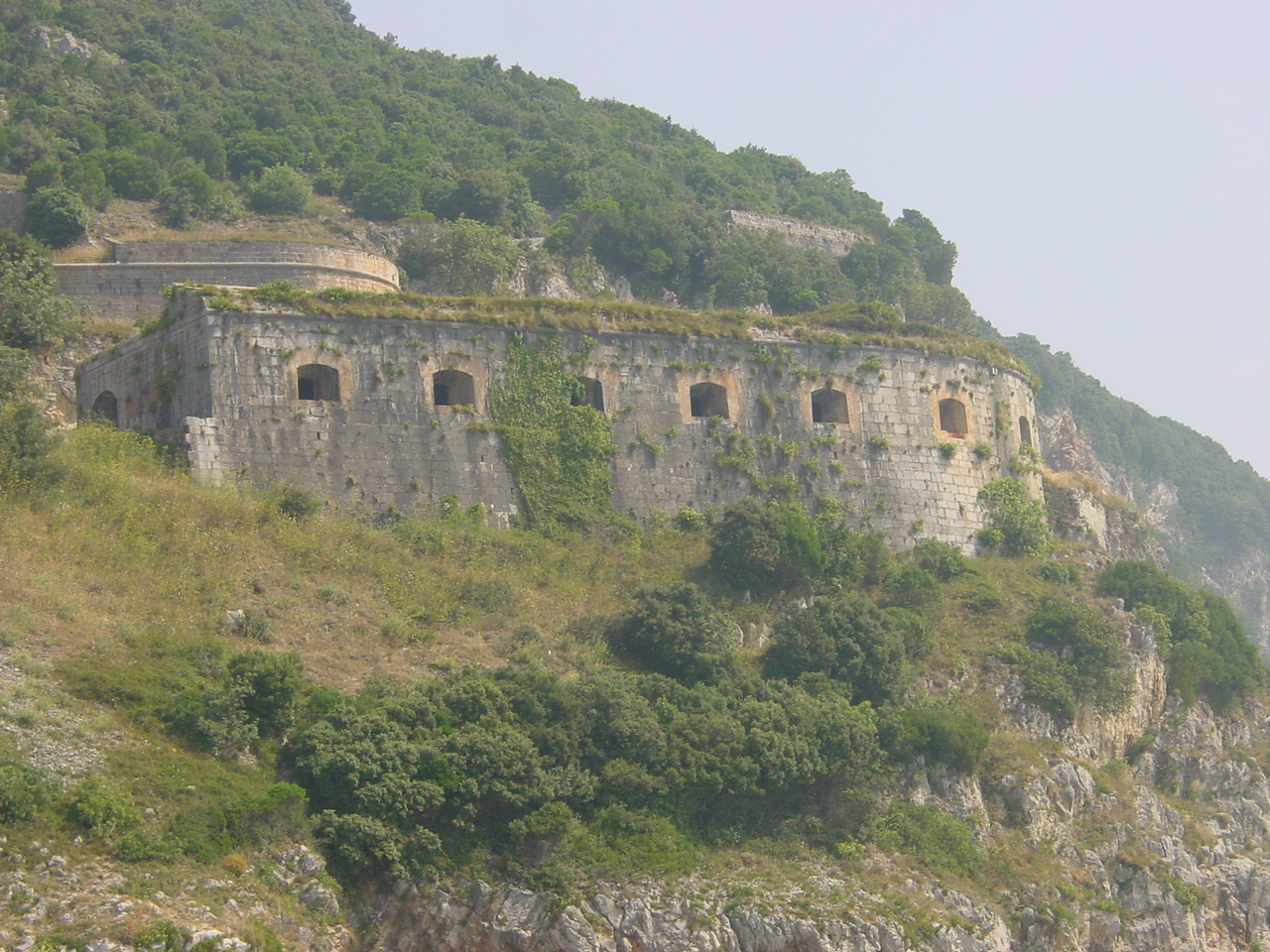
Fort San Carlos

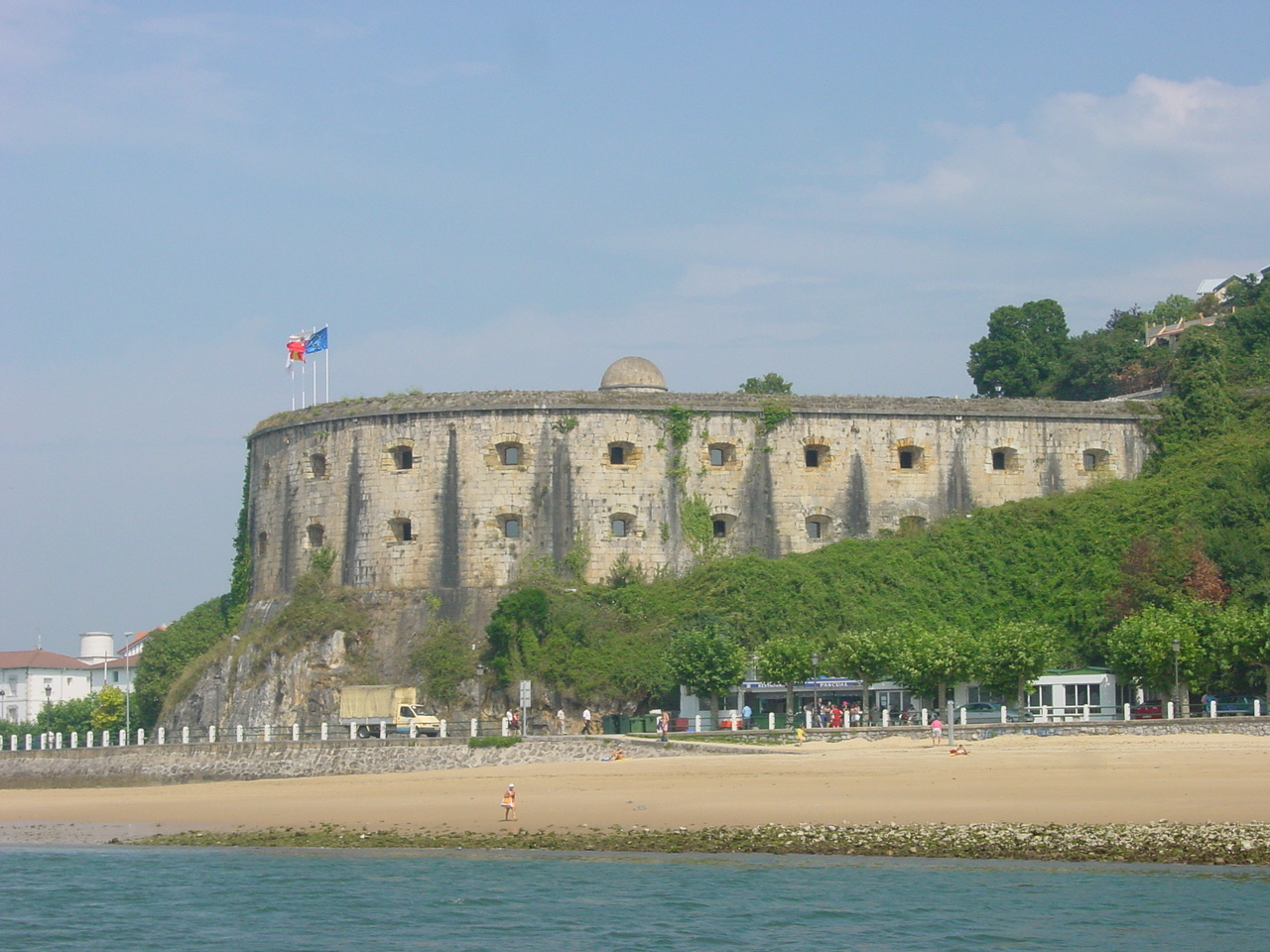
Fort San Martín

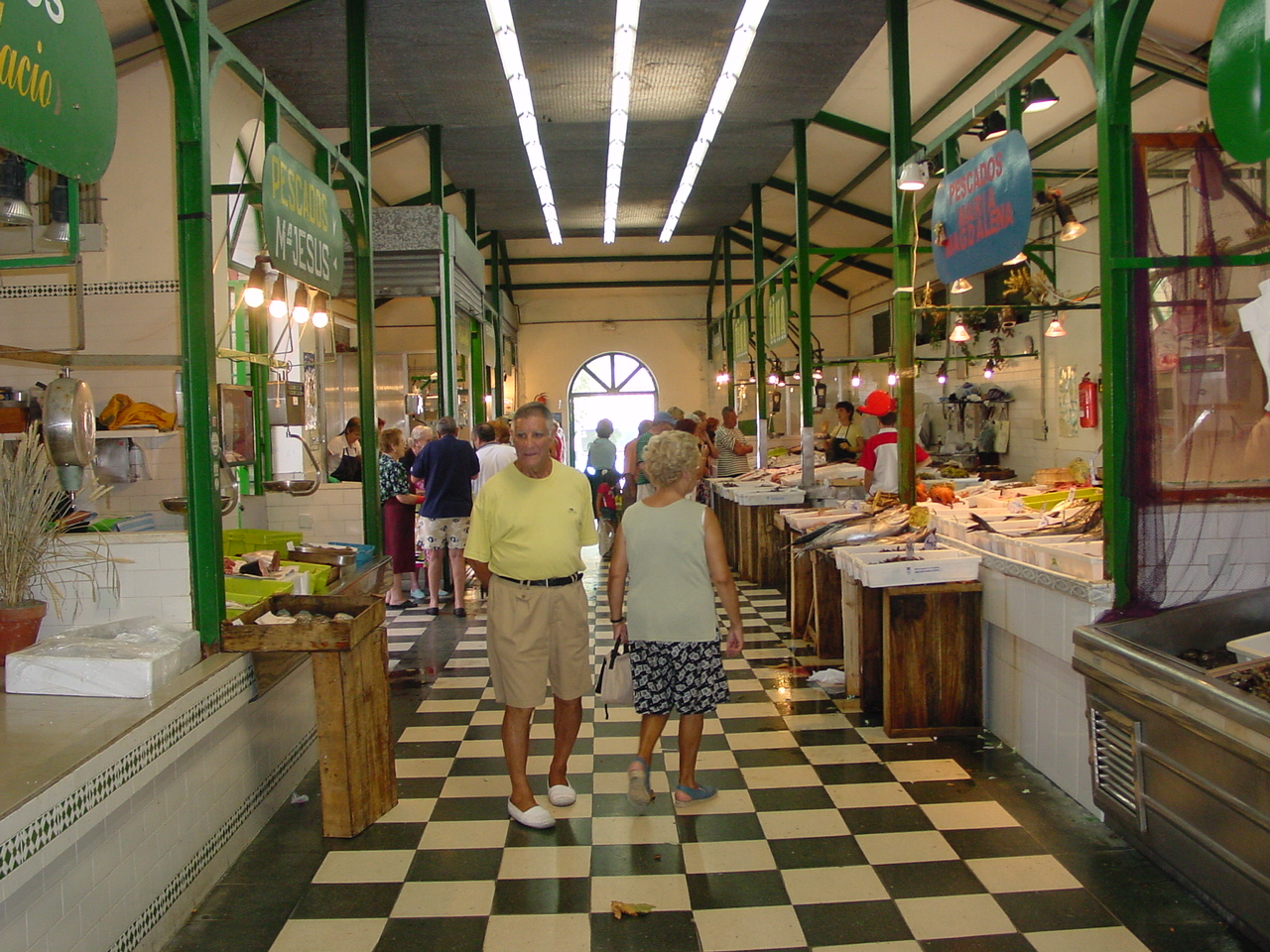
Plaza de abastos (food market)

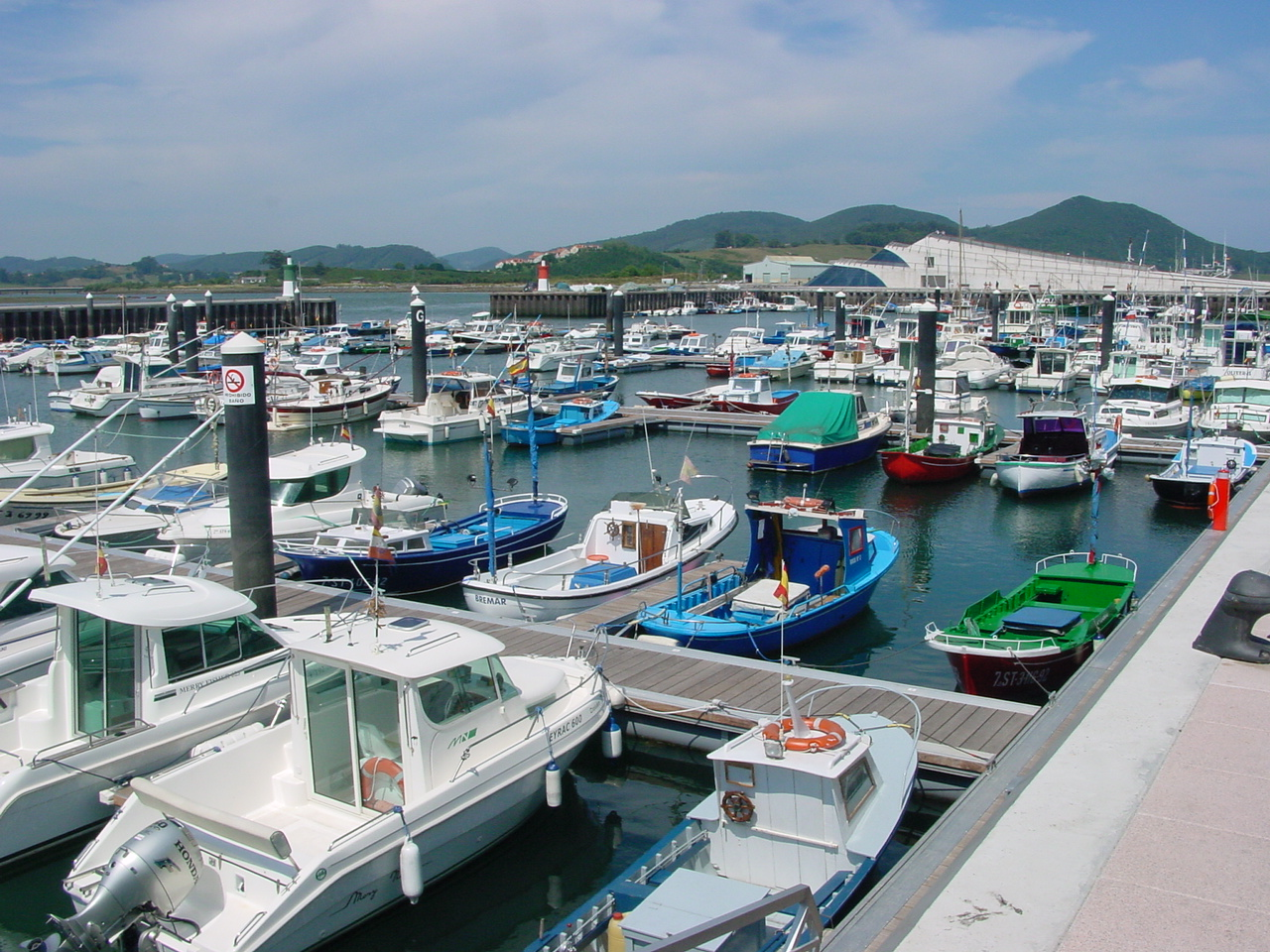
Marina

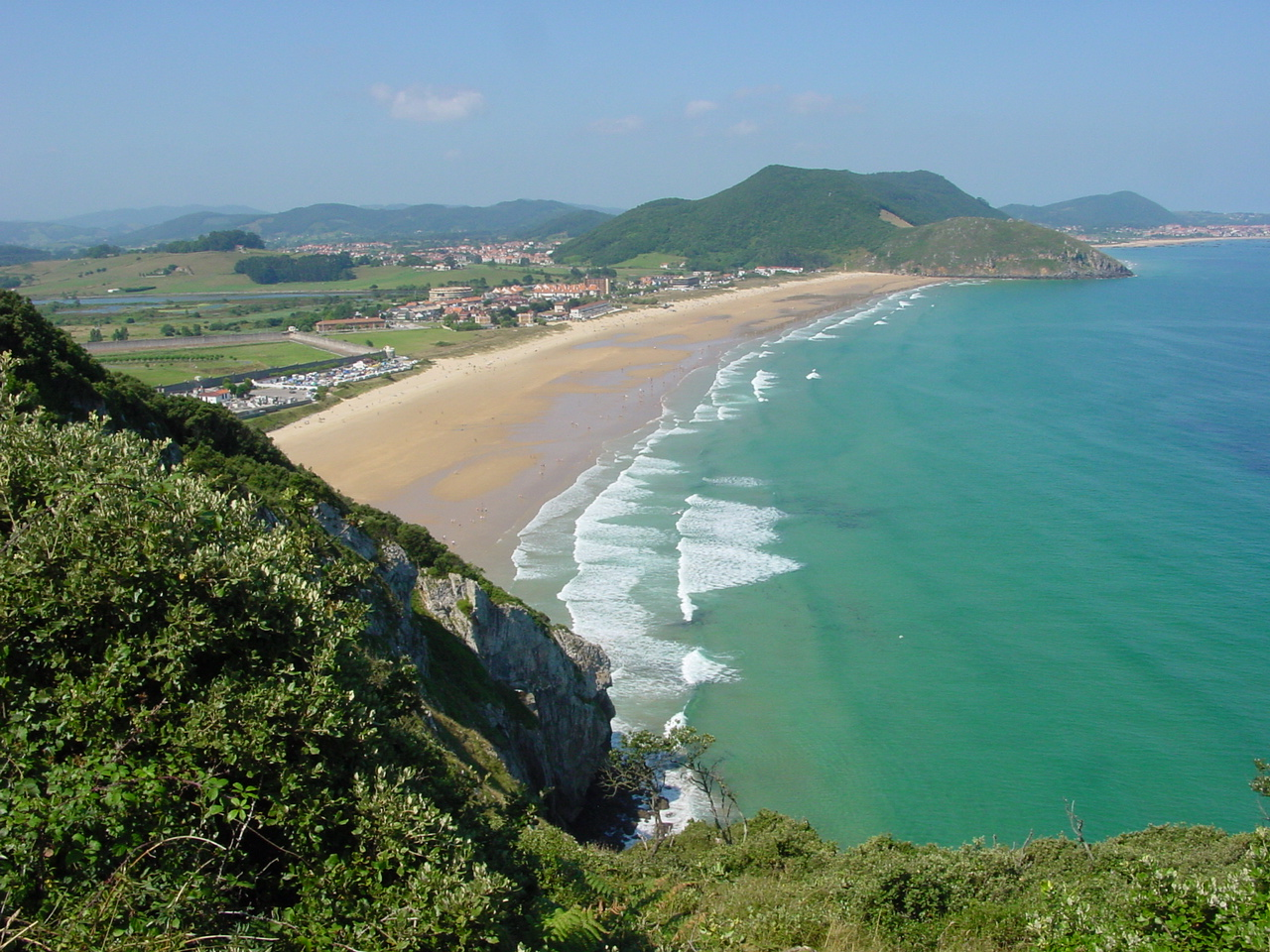
Berria beach

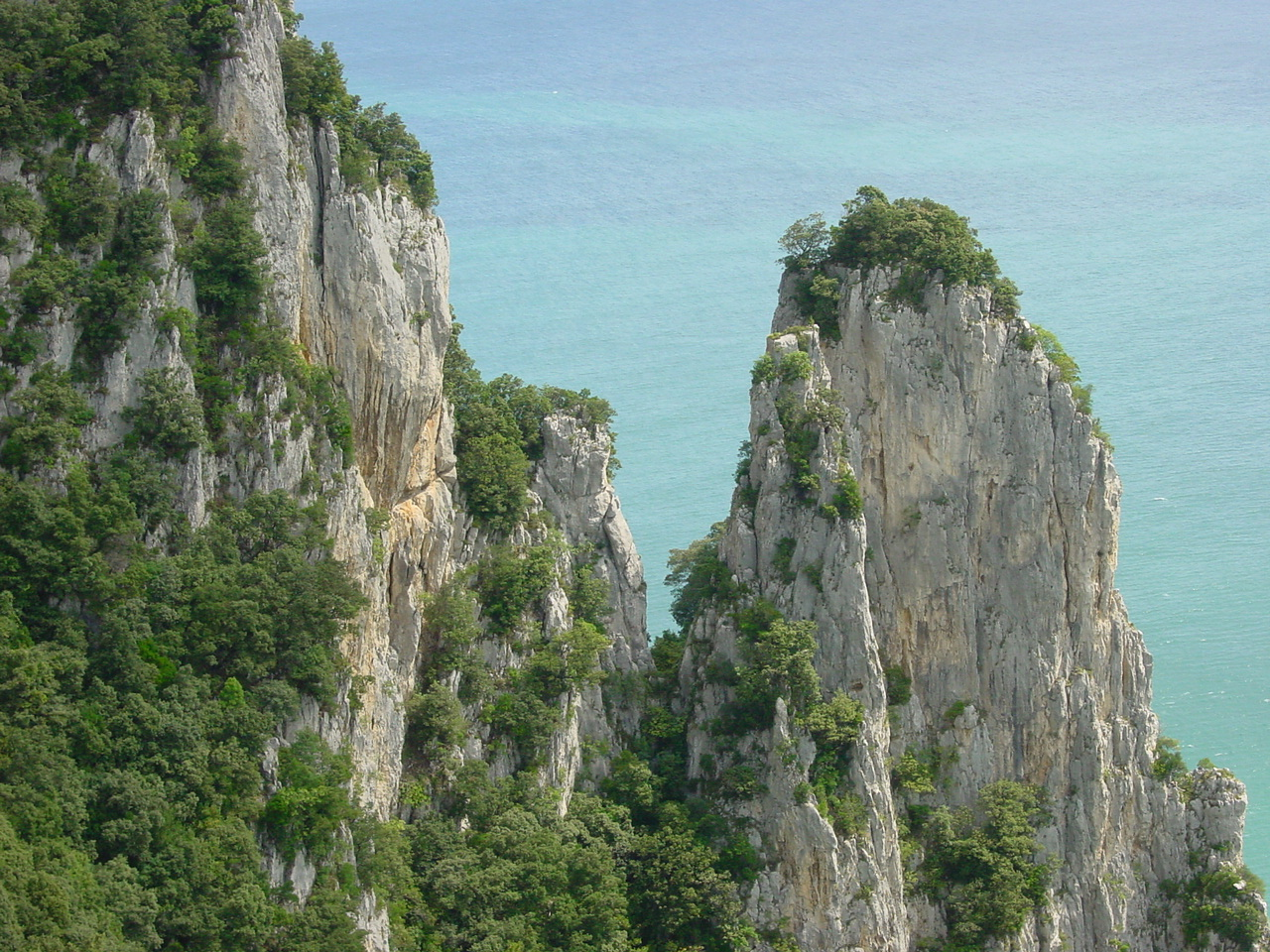
El Fraile peak

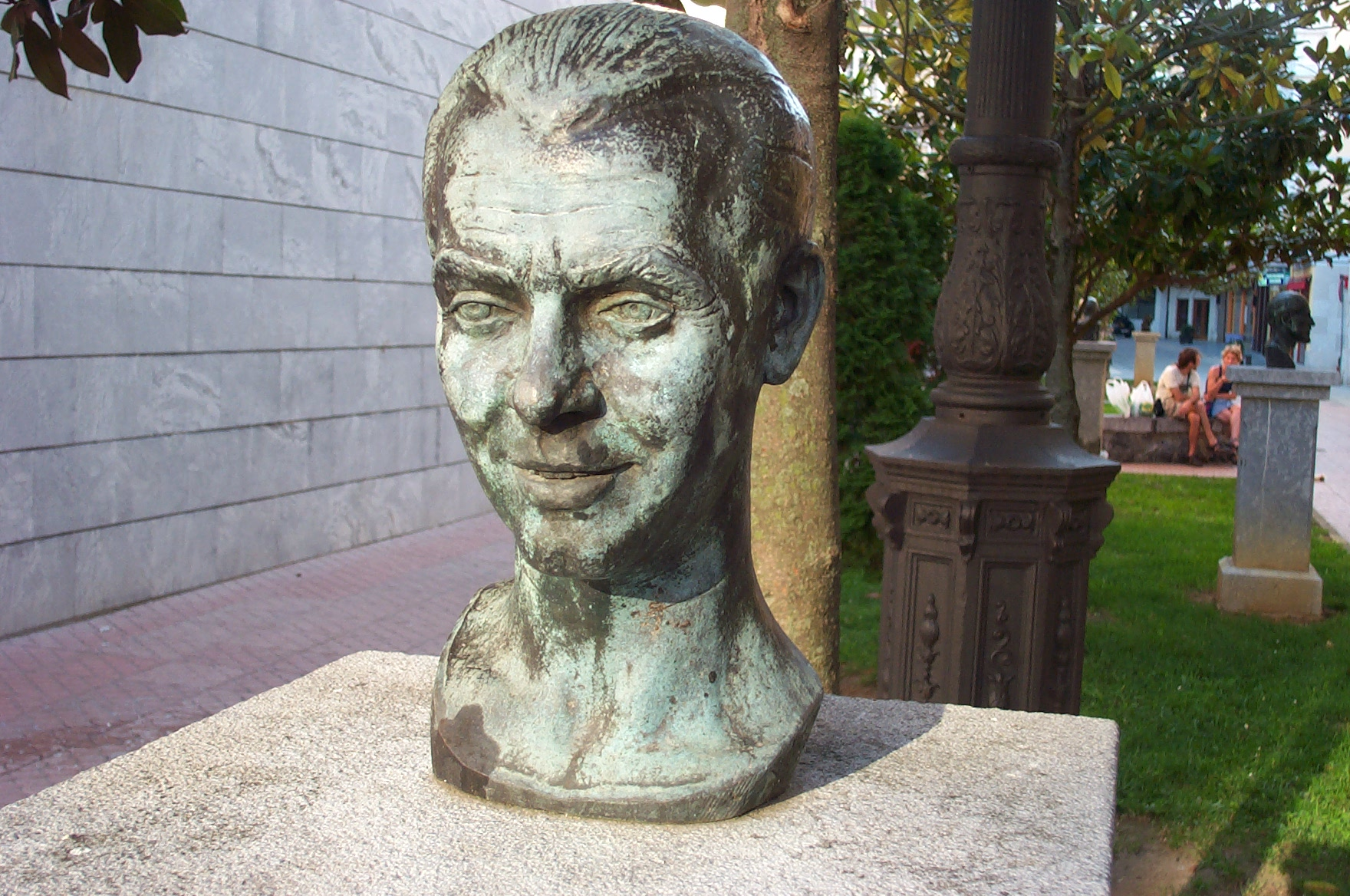
Bust of Federico García Lorca
