= USS Reid =

Four ships of the United States Navy have been named USS Reid, after Sailing Master Samuel Chester Reid.

- The first USS Reid (DD-21) was a destroyer in service from 1909 to 1919.
- The second USS Reid (DD-292) was a destroyer in service from 1919 to 1930.
- The third USS Reid (DD-369) was a destroyer launched in 1936 and sunk by kamikazes in the Philippines in 1944.
- The fourth USS Reid (FFG-30) was a guided-missile frigate commissioned 1983 and transferred to Turkey in 1999.

== See also ==
- USS Beverly W. Reid
- USS Laura Reed
