= Roadstead =

Open anchorage affording some protection, but less than a harbor

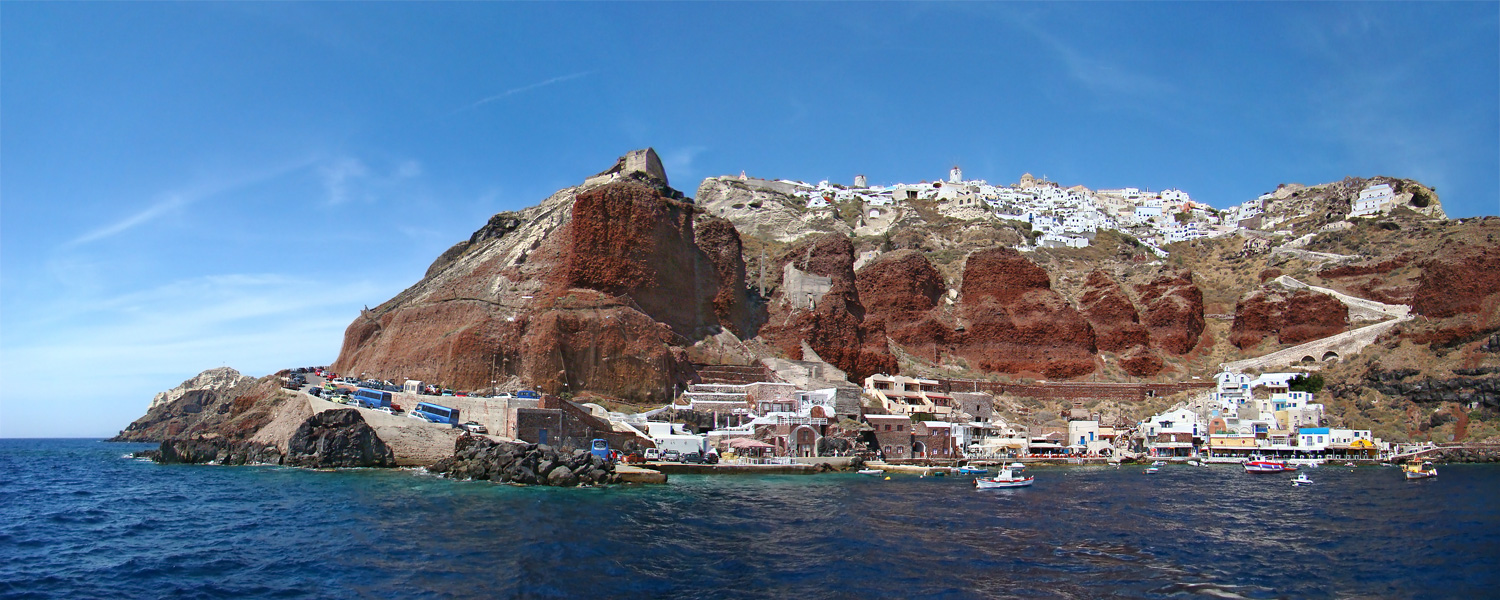
Ormos Ammoudi, a roadstead in Santorini, Greece

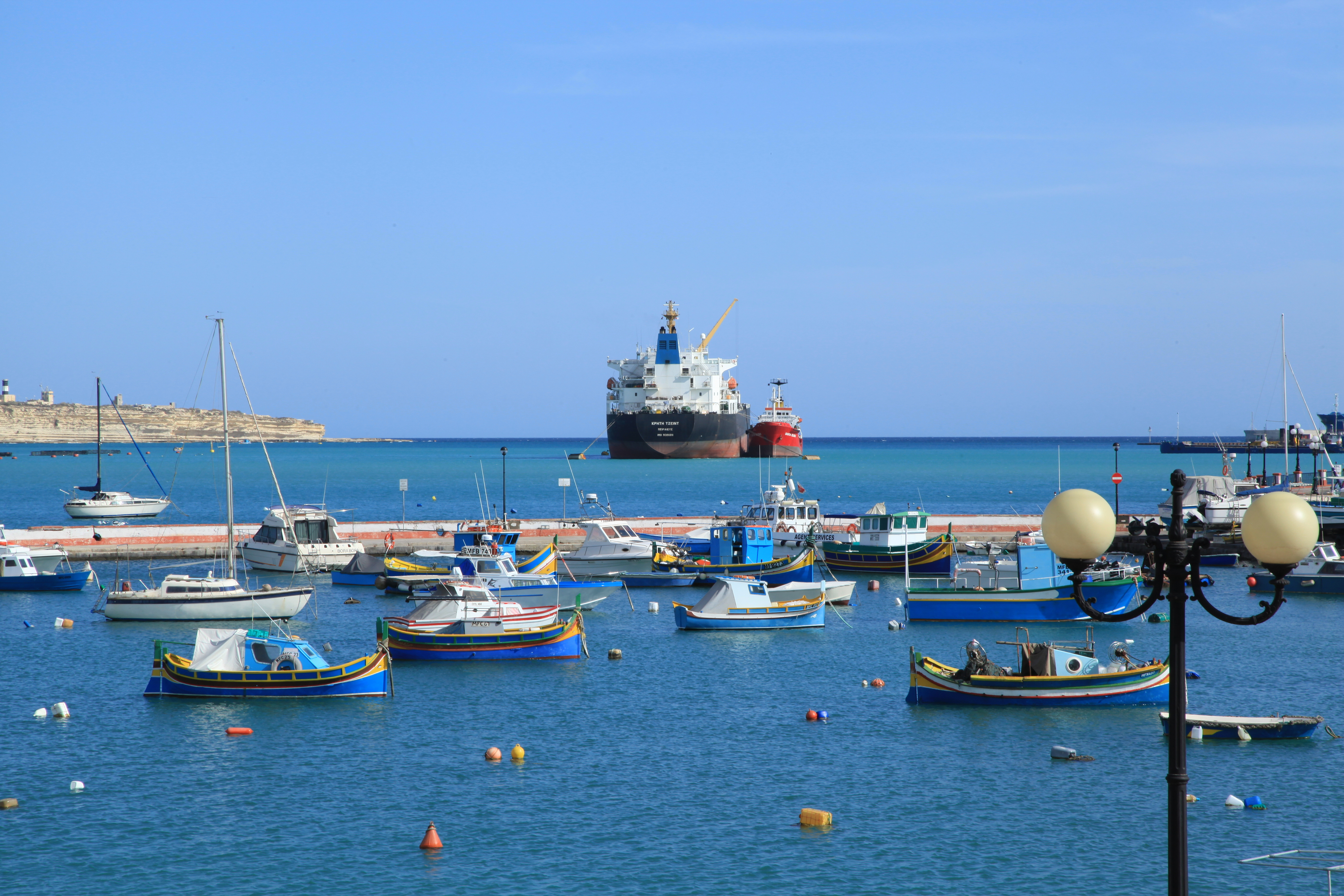
Santa Elena alongside Kriti Jade at Birzebbuga roadstead, Malta

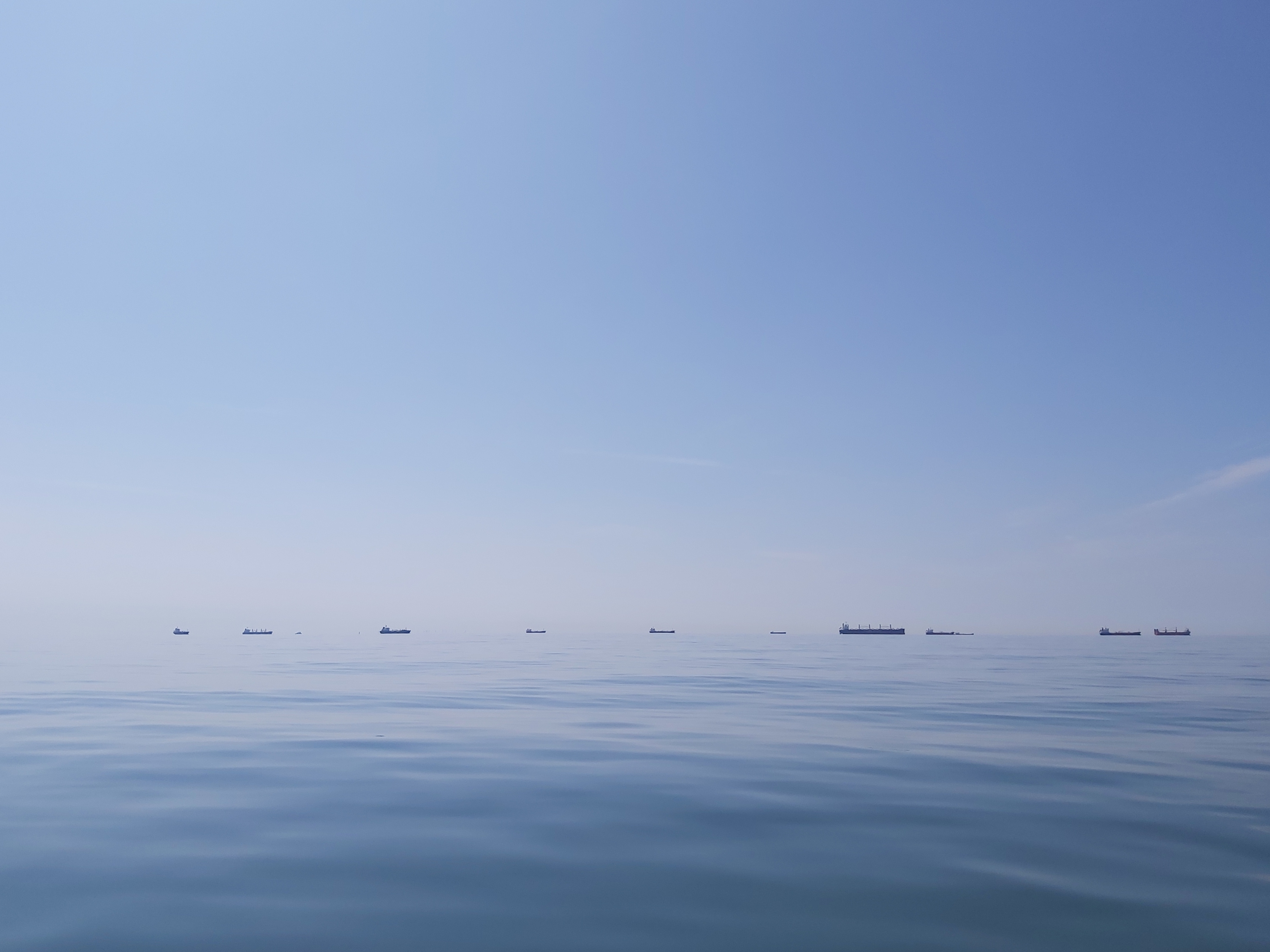
Ships on the roadstead "Aussenelbe Reede" in the north sea outside the river Elbe

A roadstead or road (Note: Charts and nautical publications often use roads rather than roadsteads. Roads is the earlier term.) is a sheltered body of water where ships can lie in relative safety at anchor without dragging or snatching. Many roadsteads are located near ports, but differ from ports in that they do not provide direct access to shore. Protected from rip currents, spring tides, or ocean swell, a roadstead can be open or natural, usually estuary-based, or may be created artificially. In maritime law, it is described as a convenient or safe place where boats usually anchor.

== Definition ==
A roadstead can be an area of safe anchorage for ships waiting to enter a port, or to form a convoy. If sufficiently sheltered and convenient, it can be used for the transshipment of goods, stores, and troops, either separately or in combination. The same applies in transfers to and from shore by lighters or barges. (Note: For example, in the Second World War, many merchant ships and many troops arriving at the UK were unloaded/disembarked from ships anchored at the Tail of the Bank in the upper Clyde estuary.)

In the days of sailing ships, some voyages could only easily be made with certain wind directions, and ships would wait for favorable winds on a roadstead such as the Downs near the English Channel, or Yarmouth Roads by the North Sea.

== Notable roadsteads ==
- Basque Roads on the Bay of Biscay, near La Rochelle, France
- Birzebbuga roadstead, near Valletta, Malta
- Bolivar Roads off Galveston, Texas, USA
- Roadstead of Brest, Brittany, France
- Carrick Roads at the estuary of the River Fal, Cornwall, England
- Castle Roads, Bermuda
- Cherbourg Harbour (la Grande Rade) is an artificial roadstead in Normandy France
- The Downs, near Deal, Kent, England
- Fayal Roads in the Azores, Portugal (site of the Battle of Fayal)
- Gage Roads, Fremantle, Western Australia
- Hampton Roads, on Chesapeake Bay Virginia, USA
- Kossol Roads, off Palau, Micronesia
- Lahaina Roads off the island of Maui in Hawaii, USA
- Lingga Roads at the Riau Islands, Indonesia
- Roadstead of Lorient, off Morbihan in Brittany, France
- Marseille Rade, France
- Milford Haven Waterway in Pembrokeshire, Wales
- The Nore sandbank on the Thames Estuary, England
- Piraeus roadstead in the Gulf of Aegina / Saronic Gulf of Greece
- Puget Sound, Washington, USA
- Roosevelt Roads Naval Station / Rosy Roads off Ceiba, Puerto Rico
- Royal Roads in Greater Victoria, British Columbia, Canada
- Scapa Flow sheltered among the Orkney Isles, Scotland
- Schillig Roads off Friesland, Germany
- Spithead on the Solent, England
- Tail of the Bank by Greenock on the Clyde estuary, Scotland
- Roadstead of Tallinn, Estonia
- Tiefwasserreede off ports of Hamburg and Bremen, Germany
- Rede van Texel was a historical roadstead off the island of Texel, Netherlands bypassed by the North Sea Canal to Amsterdam
- Toulon Roads in the Mediterranean of France
- Road Town on Tortola, British Virgin Islands
- Trondheim roadstead, Norway
- Urmston Road, Hong Kong
- Villefranche-sur-mer roadstead off the French Riviera
- Yarmouth Roads on the North Sea off Great Yarmouth, East Anglia, England
Roadsteads around the world

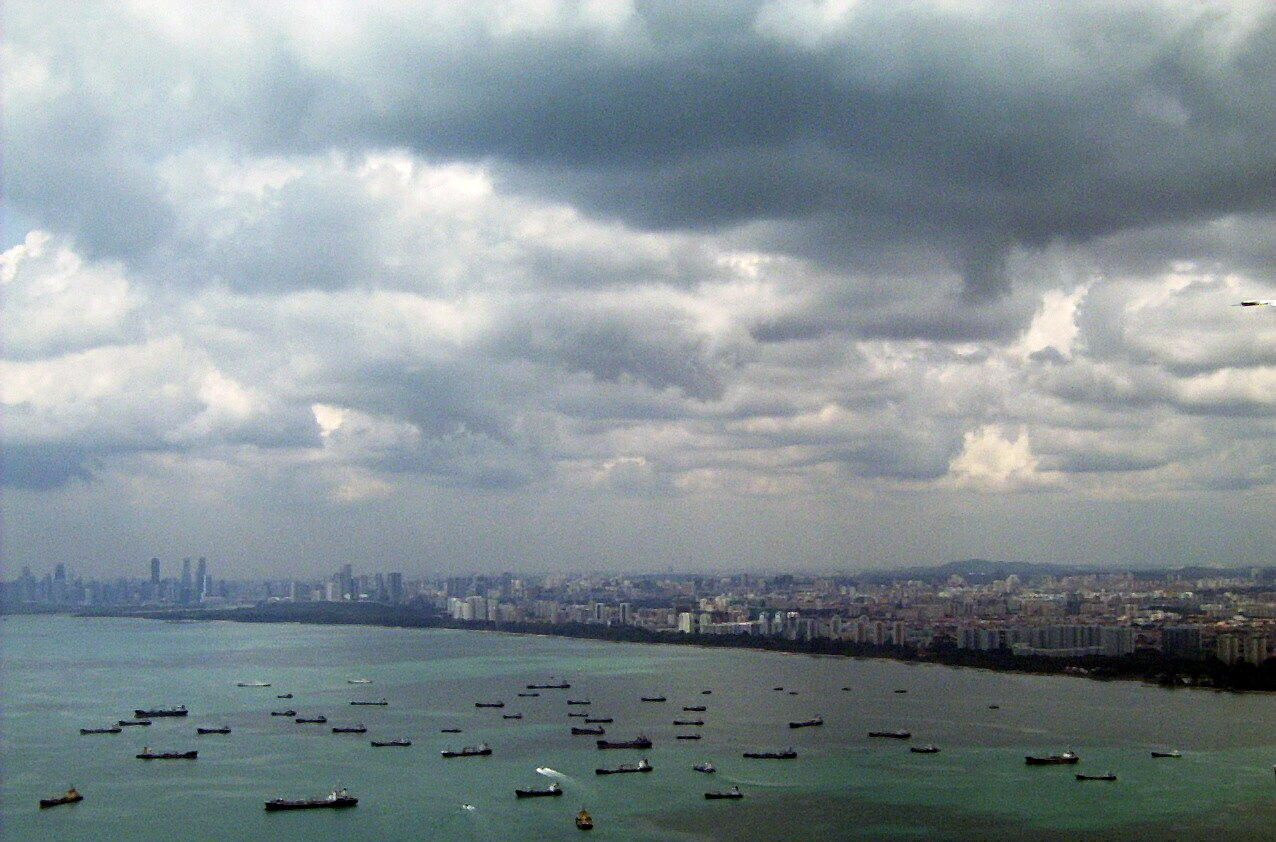
Singapore roadstead

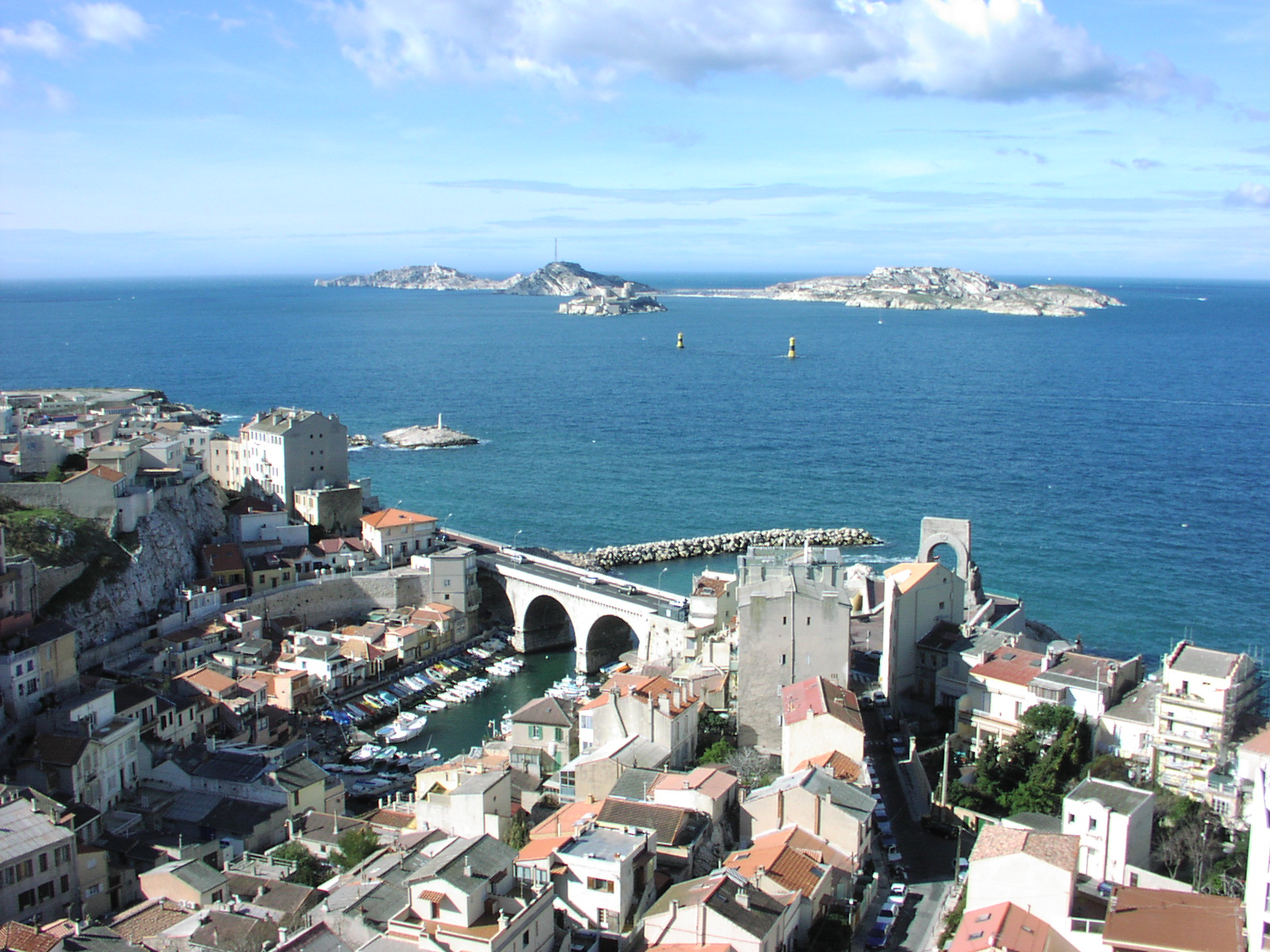
Marseille Rade

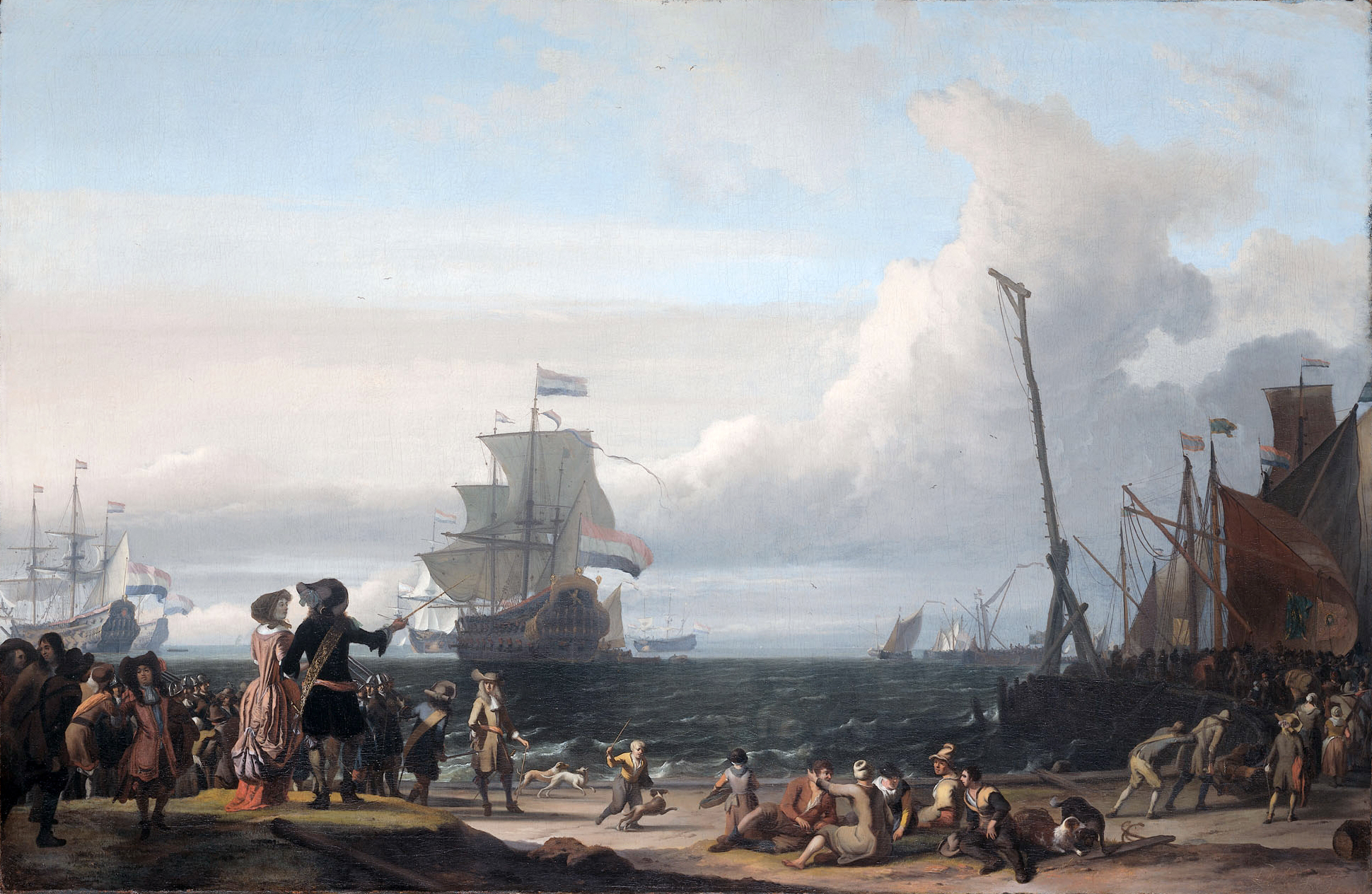
Dutch ships in the roadstead of Texel, 1671

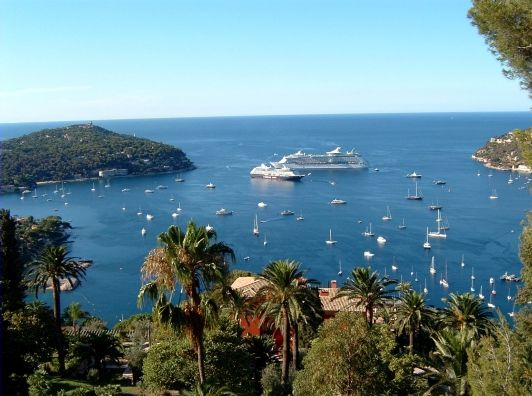
Roadstead of Villefranche-sur-mer

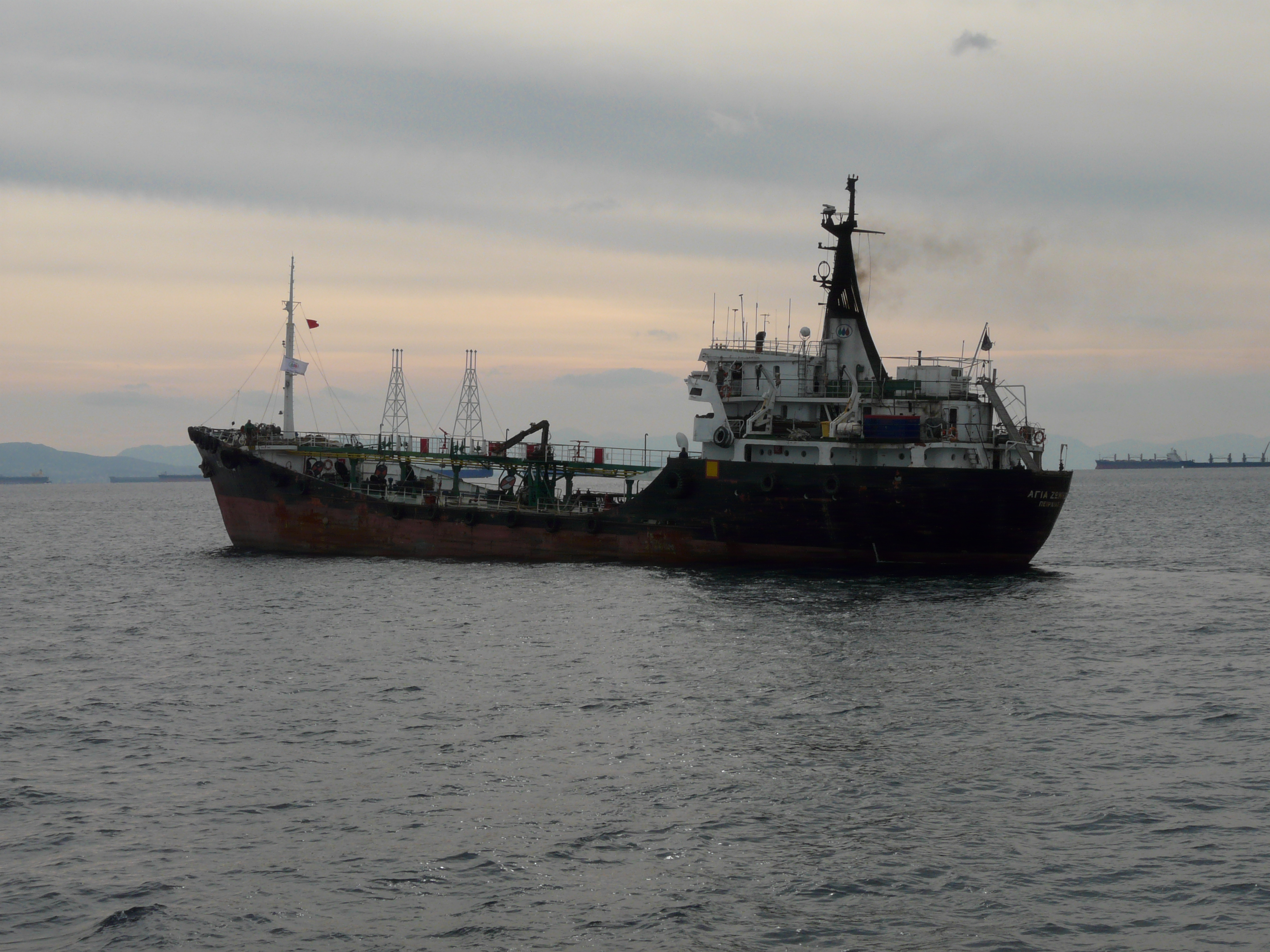
Greek bunker vessel AGIA ZONI III at Piraeus roadstead

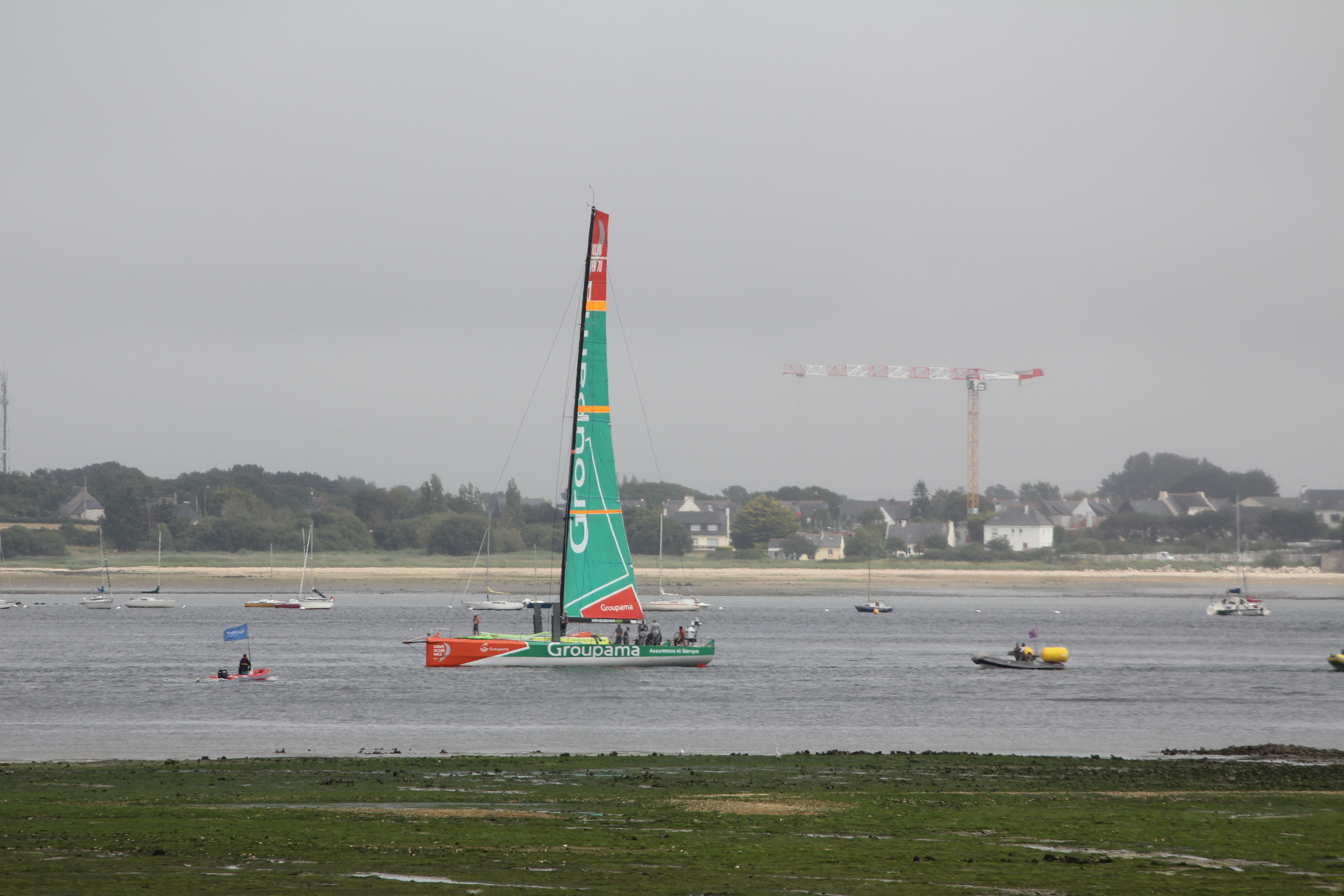
Volvo Ocean Race 2012 in the roadstead of Lorient

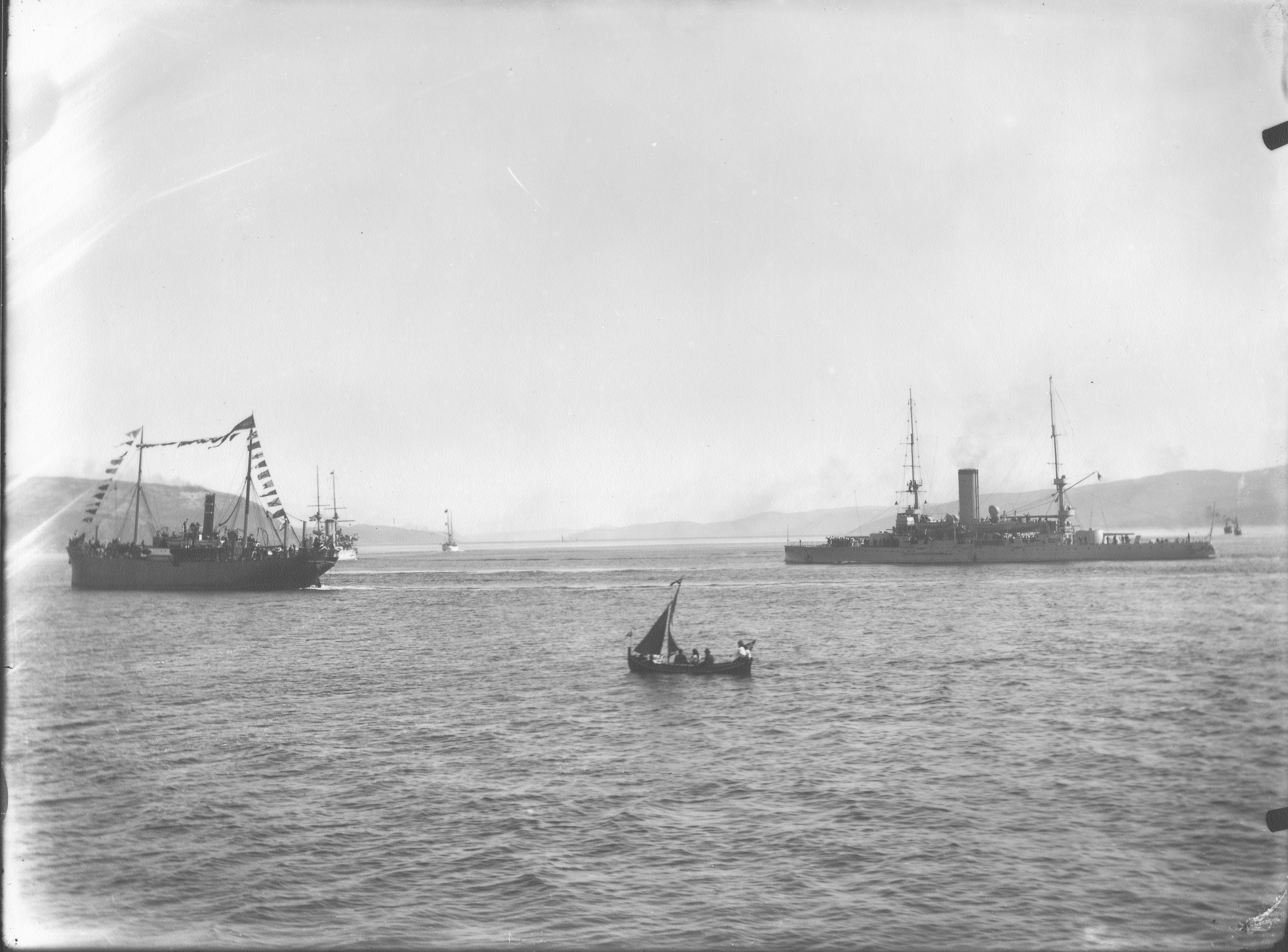
HNoMS Harald Hårfagre or Tordenskiold at the roadstead of Trondheim, 1906

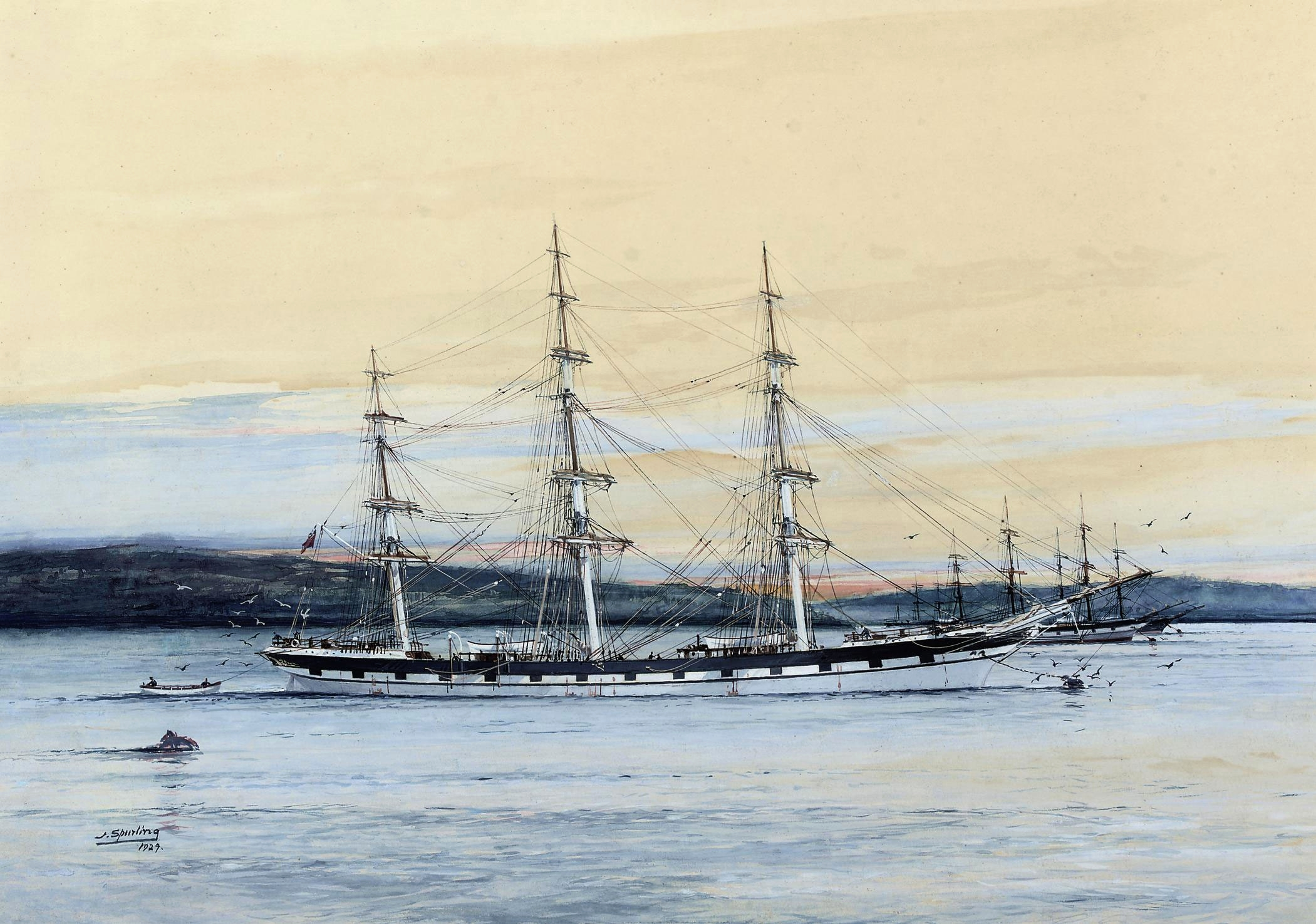
Golden Fleece lying at anchor in the roadstead (painting by Jack Spurling, 1929)

== See also ==
- Anchorage
- Battle of Copenhagen (1801), a naval battle fought at the roadstead of the Port of Copenhagen
