= Guy Richards Champlin =

18th-19th century American privateer

Guy Richards Champlin (c. 1785 – 1817) was the master of the privateer General Armstrong from 1812 to 1814 and the privateer Warrior from 1814 to 1815. He was born on 5 August 1785, in New London, Connecticut, the youngest son of Mary (née Richards) and captain Lodowick Champlin. Guy's father had been a privateer during the American War of Independence.

Captain Guy R. Champlin was one of the American sailors most feared by the British, as he had a remarkable record of bold action, great bravery and fearless aggression.

In 1817, commanding a 6-gun privateer schooner against Spanish vessels, he captured several slavers. Preparing to land several hundred slaves in the Atchafalaya River, he drowned when his boat swamped.
