= Sir Sidney Smith (1802 ship) =

British merchantman launched 1802, and captured and lost 1812

History

United Kingdom
- Name: Sir Sidney Smith
- Namesake: Admiral Sidney Smith
- Launched: 1802, Dover
- Captured: 19 November 1812

General characteristics
- Tons burthen: 200, or 250 (bm)
- Armament: 1807: 2 guns; 1810:12 × 6-pounder carronades

Sir Sidney Smith was a ship launched in 1802 at Dover. She was a West Indiaman. A United States privateer captured her in 1812. The valuable cargo on Sir Sidney Smith, which was totally lost, was the subject of cases in New York and London courts.

== Career ==
Sir Sidney Smith first appeared in Lloyd's Register (LR) in 1803.

Year	Master	Owner	Trade	Source
1803	James Smith	Captain & Co.	London–Jamaica	LR
1804	J.Smith; J.Rees	Captain & Co.	London–Jamaica	LR
1807	J.Jeffrey; Branford	Redman	London–Barbados	LR

On 26 January 1809 Sir Sidney Smith, Branford, master, had to put back to Portsmouth because she had become leaky. She had been on her way to the Cape of Good Hope. She resumed her voyage on 5 May and arrived at the Cape on 24 August. On 2 October she sailed for Rio de Janeiro.

Year	Master	Owner	Trade	Source
1811	Bradford	Redman	Dartmouth–Demerara	LR

In January 1811 Lloyd's List reported that Sir Sidney Smith had arrived at Dover from Demerara. She had repelled an attack off the Start by a French privateer schooner.

Year	Master	Owner	Trade	Source
1812	Bradford; Knight	Redman	London–Barbados	LR

== Fate ==
On 19 November 1812 the United States privateer General Armstrong captured Sir Sidney Smith as Sir Sidney Smith, Knight, master, was sailing from London and Madeira to Berbice. The news item in Lloyd's List stated that General Armstrong was armed with 19 guns. On her way to the United States Sir Sidney Smith foundered off Nantucket on 21 December. She struck on Bass Rip off Sciasconset. All aboard were lost in sight of people on shore. A rescue vessel set out but was driven back by the weather.

Lloyd's Register continued to carry Sir Sidney Smith until 1814, at which time Lloyd's Register annotated her entry with the word "captured".

Her capture did not appear in one of the most comprehensive newspaper records of United States privateers and their prizes.

The loss of Sir Sidney Smith gave rise to the case "Frederick Jenkins et al. (General Armstrong) v. Goods and merchandise from Sir Sidney Smith (1813)", in the U.S. District Court for the Southern District of New York.
