= Tiefwasserreede =

Tiefwasserreede

The Tiefwasserreede (lit. 'deep water anchorage') is an exclave of Germany's territorial waters in the German Bight, used as a roadstead for shipping waiting for access to the Port of Hamburg, Ports of Bremen and other North Sea ports. The exclave lies around 30 kilometres (19 miles; 16 nautical miles) west of Heligoland, outside the 12 mile limit that usually defines territorial waters, but remains German territory under Article 12 of the United Nations Convention on the Law of the Sea which makes an exception for roadsteads. It legally forms part of the state of Lower Saxony and is completely surrounded by the German exclusive economic zone.

== Definition ==
Germany initially announced plans to declare the Tiefwasserreede as sovereign territory in 1983. Motivated by the 1978 Amoco Cadiz oil spill, the federal government and states wanted to assert sovereignty over coastal waters in order to combat oil pollution – particularly ships pumping oil in the North Sea. Following the passage of the UN Convention on the Law of the Sea, Germany announced it would both extend its territorial waters from 3 miles to 12, and declare a deep water roadstead. The move was opposed by the United States and German Navy, who feared a reprisal from East Germany, which could significantly reduce access to the Baltic Sea by extending its own territorial waters.

Before the UN Convention could come into force, the Tiefwasserreede and other waters around Heligoland were declared as German territorial waters - the "Helgoland-Box" - in 1985, while the 3-mile rule still ruled the rest of the coastline. The 12 mile rule was not implemented until 1994. Tiefwasserreede was then defined in law as the patch of sea bounded by the following points:

1. 54°08′11″N 7°24′36″E
2. 54°08′19″N 7°26′59″E
3. 54°01′39″N 7°33′04″E
4. 54°00′27″N 7°24′36″E

== Challenges ==
The stretch of water at the mouths of the rivers Jade, Weser and Elbe – the Heligoland Bight – is one of the busiest shipping channels in the world, and when there are delays at German ports, significant traffic can build up in the Tiefwasserreede. During the 2021–2022 global supply chain crisis, over a dozen ships were sometimes waiting at a time in the roadstead. The use of the water as an anchorage poses some challenges for German offshore wind power, as undersea power cables must be routed away from the Tiefwasserreede to avoid damage from ship's anchors. Offshore wind farms cannot be built within two nautical miles of the Tiefwasserreede.

As well as a mooring for ships, the Tiefwasserreede is also used as a dumping ground for bay mud from dredging of the Elbe at Hamburg.
