= USS Reid (DD-369) =

Mahan-class destroyer

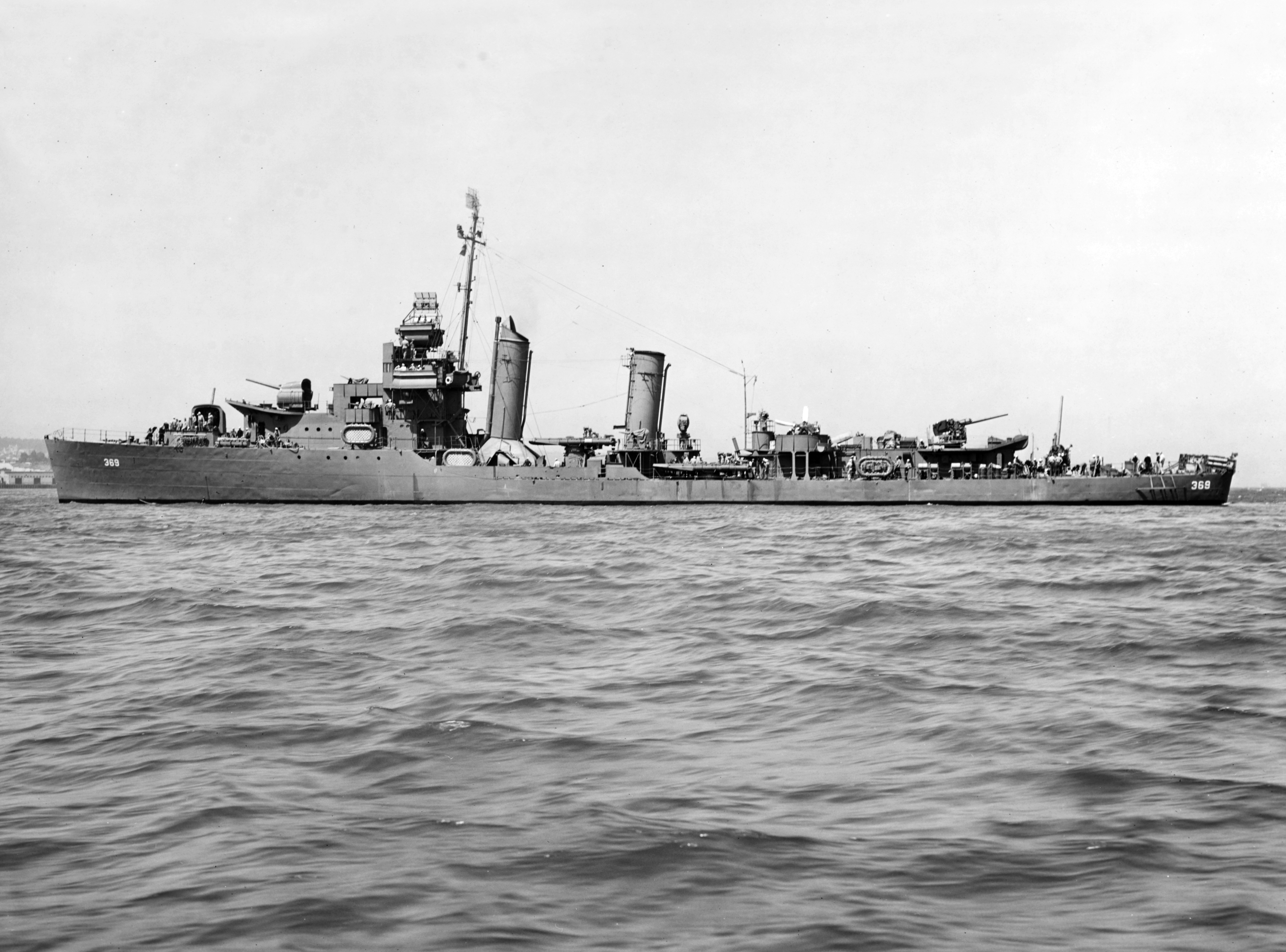

History

United States
- Namesake: Samuel Chester Reid
- Builder: Federal Shipbuilding and Drydock Company
- Laid down: 25 June 1934
- Launched: 11 January 1936
- Commissioned: 2 November 1936
- Fate: Sunk by kamikazes, 11 December 1944

General characteristics
- Class & type: Mahan-class destroyer
- Displacement: 1,500 tons
- Length: 341 ft 4 in (104 m)
- Beam: 35 ft (10.7 m)
- Draft: 9 ft 10 in (2.8 m)
- Speed: 37 knots (69 km/h)
- Complement: 158 officers and crew
- Armament: 5 x 5 in (130 mm) guns; 12 x 21 inch (533 mm) torpedo tubes

The third USS Reid (DD-369) was a Mahan-class destroyer in the United States Navy before and during World War II. She was named for Samuel Chester Reid, a U.S. Navy officer in the War of 1812 who helped design the 1818 version of the flag of the United States.

== History ==
Reid was laid down 25 June 1934 by Federal Shipbuilding and Drydock Company, Kearny, New Jersey; launched 11 January 1936; sponsored by Mrs. Beatrice Reid Power; and commissioned 2 November 1936, Captain Robert B. Carney in command.

From 1937 into 1941, Reid participated in training and fleet maneuvers in the Atlantic and Pacific. During the attack on Pearl Harbor, Reid's gunners fired at the Japanese planes and downed one of them. After the attack, Reid patrolled off the Hawaiian Islands, Palmyra Atoll, and Johnston Island during December. In January 1942, she escorted a convoy to San Francisco, California. Returning to Hawaii for more patrol duty, she later steamed to Midway Island, and then twice more escorted convoys from Pearl Harbor to San Francisco.

Departing Pearl Harbor on 22 May 1942, Reid steamed north to bombard Japanese positions on Kiska Island, Alaska on 7 August 1942. She supported landings at Adak, Alaska on 30 August and sank by gunfire the Japanese submarine Ro-61 on 31 August. After transferring five Japanese prisoners to Dutch Harbor, Alaska, she reached Pearl Harbor on 30 September 1942, then departed on 7 October to escort Task Group 15.1 to Pago Pago, American Samoa, which she reached on 22 October. She departed Pago Pago on 23 October for Pearl Harbor, arriving there on 30 October 1942. She left for San Francisco on 4 November 1942, arriving on 12 November 1942. She remained at Mare Island Navy Yard for overhaul until 6 December 1942, when she departed with Task Group 2.17 for New Caledonia. En route, she called in with the Task group to Nadi, Fiji on 18 December 1942. She shifted with the Task group to Suva, Fiji on 20 December 1942.

Departing Suva Harbor, Fiji Islands on Christmas Day 1942, she escorted Army troops to Guadalcanal before guarding a convoy to Espiritu Santo, New Hebrides. In January 1943, she bombarded several enemy locations on Guadalcanal.

After patrols in the Solomon Islands, Reid provided radar information and fighter direction for landings at Lae, New Guinea on 4 September 1943. While supporting landings at Finschhafen, New Guinea, she downed two enemy planes on 22 September 1943.

Following patrol and escort duty off New Guinea, she sailed from Buna Roads, New Guinea, to escort troop transports for landings at Arawe, New Britain, 15 December 1943. She protected landings at Cape Gloucester, New Britain, on 26 December 1943, and at Saidor, New Guinea, 2 January 1944. She guarded landings at Los Negros Island, Admiralty Islands, 29 February 1944, and at Hollandia, New Guinea, 22 April. Her guns supported landings at Wakde Island 17 May, at Biak on the 27 May, and at Noemfoor Island, New Guinea, 2 July.

Departing Pearl Harbor 29 August 1944, she supported air strikes against Wake Island 3 September. After patrols off Leyte, Philippine Islands in November, she steamed to Ormoc Bay, Leyte, Philippines. She supported landings there 7 December, and escorted the damaged destroyer Lamson toward Leyte Gulf.

== Fate ==
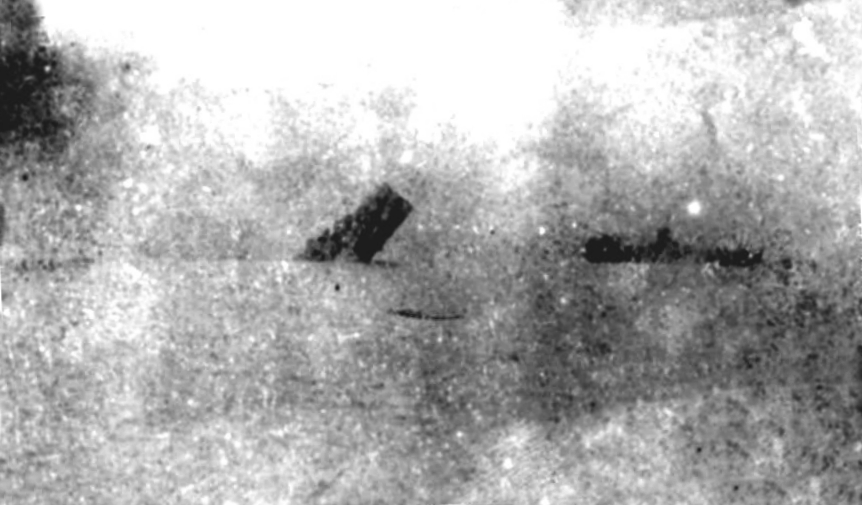
USS Reid sinking, 11 December 1944. An infantry landing craft is visible on the right.

In Reid's final two weeks in the waters around Leyte, the crew was able to sleep only an hour or two at a time. They were called to battle stations (condition red) an average of 10 times a day. It was a period of near constant combat. While escorting reinforcements for Ormoc Bay near Surigao Straits 11 December 1944, Reid destroyed seven Japanese planes, when the following took place:

Reid was protecting a re-supply force of amphibious craft bound for Ormoc Bay off the west coast of Leyte. At about 1700 hours, twelve enemy planes approached the convoy. Reid was the nearest ship to the oncoming planes. Planes 1 and 2 were shot down by the 5-inch battery, and Plane 3 exploded about 500 yards (460 m) off the starboard beam. Plane 4 hooked a wing on the starboard rigging, crashing at the waterline. Its bomb exploded, causing considerable damage forward. Plane 5 strafed the starboard side and crashed on the port bow. Plane 6 strafed the bridge from the port side and crashed off the starboard bow. Planes 5 and 6 apparently had no bombs or their bombs were duds. Plane 7 came in from astern, strafed Reid and crashed into the port quarter. Its bomb exploded in the after magazine, blowing the ship apart. All this action took place in less than a minute.

The ship was mortally wounded but still doing 20 knots (37 km/h; 23 mph). As the stern opened up, she rolled violently, then lay over on her starboard side and dove to the bottom at 600 fathoms (3,600 ft; 1,100 m). It was over in less than two minutes, and 103 crewmen went down with the ship. The survivors were strafed in the water by Japanese planes before rescue. Her 150 survivors were picked up by landing craft in her convoy.

Reid received seven battle stars for World War II service.
