= General Armstrong =

American Privateer Brig

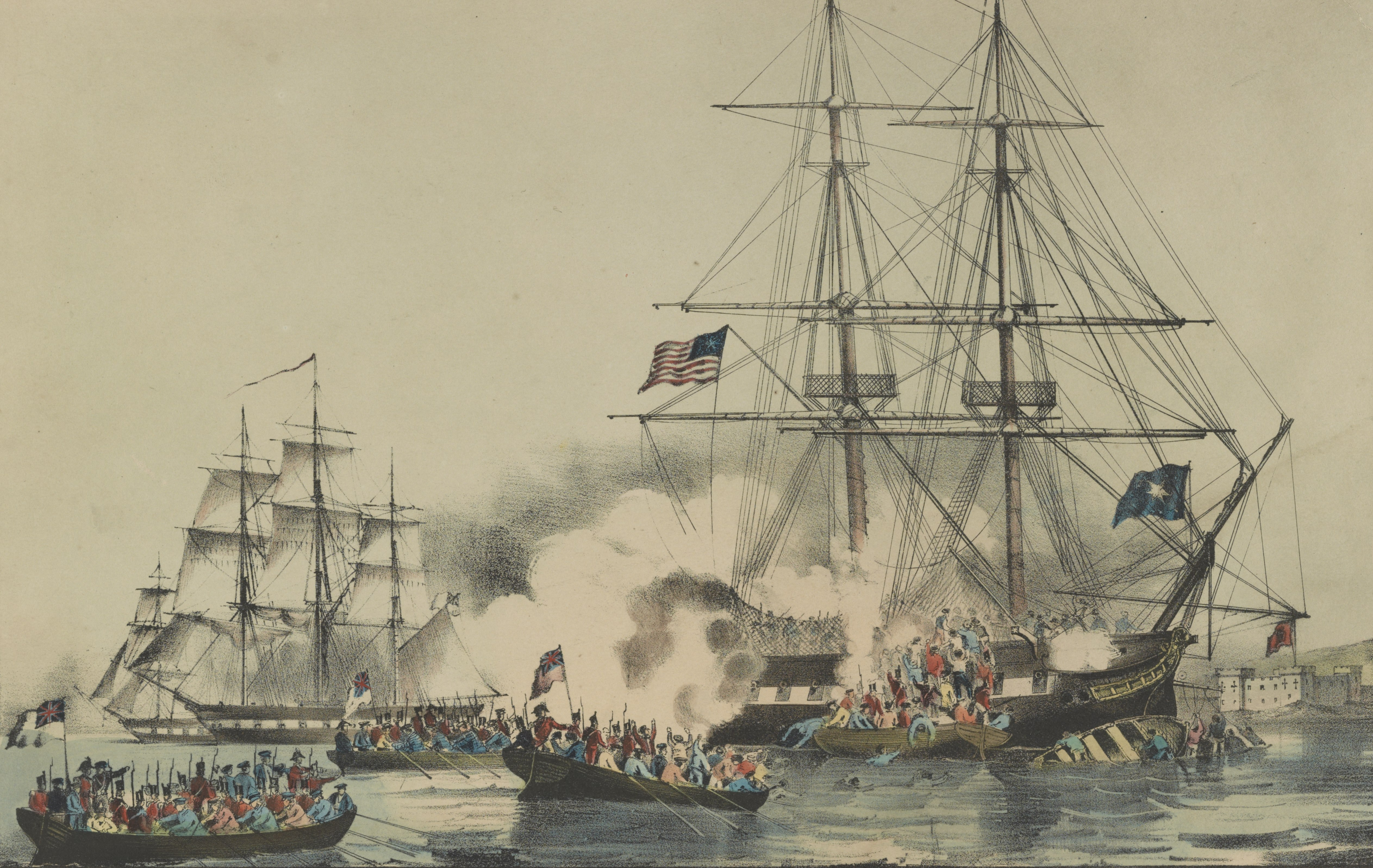

History

United States
- Name: General Armstrong
- Namesake: John Armstrong, Sr.
- Builder: Adam and Noah Brown
- Homeport: New York, NY
- Fate: Scuttled on 27 September 1814 at Faial

General characteristics
- Type: Brig
- Tons burthen: 246 (bm)
- Complement: 90 officers and men
- Armament: 8 × long 9-pounder guns; 1 × long 42-pounder gun (Long Tom)
- Notes: War of 1812: Capture of Fanny; Battle of Fayal

General Armstrong was an American brig built for privateering in the Atlantic Ocean theater of the War of 1812. She was named for Brigadier General John Armstrong, Sr., who fought in the American Revolutionary War.

== War of 1812 ==
General Armstrong was based in New York City and crewed by about 90 men. Captain Tim Barnard commanded the ship in 1812. Guy Richards Champlin led the ship from 1813 through July 1814, followed by Captain Samuel Chester Reid until the ship's September 1814 scuttling in Faial. She was armed with seven guns, including a 42-pounder Long Tom cannon.

=== Queen ===
On 11 November 1812 the General Armstrong—armed with 16 guns and 40 men—attacked the English ship Queen (Captain Conkey). Queen was sailing from Liverpool to Suriname with cargo valued at £90,000. Her crew resisted and did not strike her colours until the captain, first officer, and nine of the crew were killed. Queen was possibly one of the most valuable prizes captured by American privateers during the War of 1812. A prize crew began sailing Queen to the United States, but wrecked it off the Nantucket coast.

=== Battle of Suriname River ===
On 11 March 1813 the General Armstrong was sailing in the mouth of the Suriname River when she encountered a vessel the crew presumed to be a British privateer but was, in fact, the British sloop HMS Coquette. The ensuing battle severely damaged General Armstrong. Its captain, Guy Richards Champlin, was injured and threatened to blow up the ship if the crew surrendered. General Armstrong ultimately escaped.

In his log-book Champlin wrote: "In this action we had six men killed and sixteen wounded, and all the halyards of the headsails shot away; the fore-mast and bowsprit one quarter cut through, and all the fore and main shrouds but one shot away; both mainstays and running rigging cut to pieces; a great number of shot through our sails, and several between wind and water, which caused our vessel to leak. There were also a number of shot in our hull."

General Armstrong returned to the United States, arriving in Charleston on 4 April. General Armstrong's shareholders awarded Champlin a sword for saving the ship from capture or destruction.

=== Battle of Fayal ===
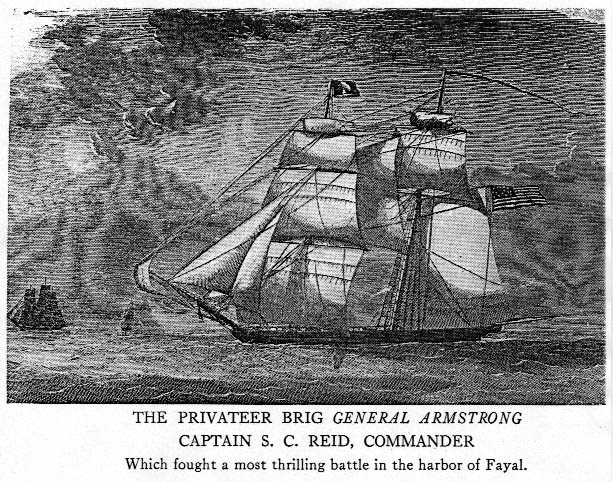
"The Privateer Brig General Armstrong Captain S. C. Reid Commander. Which fought a thrilling battle in the Harbor of Fayal."

General Armstrong is perhaps most remembered for her involvement in the Battle of Fayal, under the captaincy of Samuel Chester Reid, on 26 and 27 September 1814. In the engagement, the British brig-sloop Carnation and several boats armed with cannon and carrying sailors and marines attempted to cut out the General Armstrong. General Armstrong repulsed the attacks but Captain Reid felt he could not escape the Azores so he ordered the General Armstrong scuttled after fighting off the Carnation a second time on 27 September. The Americans made it to shore where Portuguese authorities and the American consul John Bass Dabney protected them. American casualties amounted to two killed and seven wounded, while the British lost 36 men killed and 93 wounded. General Armstrong also sunk two British boats and captured two others.

== Other engagements ==
=== 1812 ===
Two days after General Armstrong captured Queen, it captured Lucy & Alida (captained by Deamy), a ship sailing from Suriname to Liverpool with dry goods. However, the letter of marque Barton of Liverpool recaptured Lucy & Alida. (Note: There were two Liverpool-based ships named Barton sailing at that time—Barton and Barton—and it is not clear which one recaptured Lucy & Alida.) The American privateer Revenge of Norfolk later captured Lucy & Alinda.

On 19 November 1812 General Armstrong captured Sir Sidney Smith as Sir Sidney Smith, Knight, master, was sailing from London and Madeira to Berbice. The news item in Lloyd's List stated that General Armstrong was armed with 19 guns. Sir Sidney Smith foundered off Nantucket, (Note: The cargo of Sir Sidney Smith was the subject of a case in New York prize courts.)

On 29 November General Armstrong unsuccessfully attacked Maxwell off the Brazil coast. General Armstrong also captured the brig Union, originally sailing from Guernsey to Saint Kitts, and sent to New York after her capture.

=== 1813 ===
In 1813 General Armstrong captured and burned an unnamed schooner and an unnamed brig that were sailing to France.

On 20 March 1813 William, Cunningham, master, was on her way from St John's New Brunswick, to Barbados when General Armstrong captured William within sight of Barbados. General Armstrong took William into Puerto Rico. HMS Spider, Captain Willcock, claimed her there. The authorities gave William up and she arrived at St Thomas's on 19 April.

=== 1814 ===
The General Armstrong captured multiple ships throughout 1814. In January she captured the sloop Resolution, which was sailing from Jersey for Lisbon with linen and paper, seizing her cargo and releasing her. That month General Armstrong also captured and scuttled the brig Phoebe, which sailed from Forney for Madeira laden with butter and potatoes.

On 19 April 1814 General Armstrong captured the eighteen-gun British letter of marque Fanny and its 45-man crew off the coast of Ireland. Fanny had been sailing from Maranhão to Liverpool. The engagement lasted about an hour and was described as a "severe" close-range action fought within "pistol shot range." Eventually the British struck their colors after several men were killed or wounded. The General Armstrong's crew lost one killed and six wounded; Fanny lost a like number out of a much smaller crew. The British third-rate ship Sceptre later recaptured Fanny.

On 26 April 1814 Lloyd's List reported the General Armstrong was seized and the crew taken prisoner when she put into Dunkirk. However, the crew was later released and General Armstrong allowed to sail. On 25 June 1814 General Armstrong captured the Portuguese ship Mercury but allowed her to proceed as she was neutral. On 19 July 1814 General Armstrong captured the sloop Henrietta, which was bound to Chesapeake with stores, and sent her to Egg Harbor.

According to Niles' Register, during the rest of 1814 the General Armstrong captured various other prizes:

- brig Duke of York, of Greenock, captured and burnt
- sloop George, laden with pork, captured off the Ireland coast and sunk
- brig Swift, in ballast, captured and made into a cartel ship
- brig Defiance, laden with whiskey, butter, and bread and bound for Lisbon, captured and burnt
- brig Friendship, laden as above, captured and burnt
- brig Stag, laden with a full and very valuable cargo of dry goods, captured and divested of some articles and burnt in sight of a British frigate, brig, and schooner
- ship Dorcas, out of Anguilla, captured by the General Armstrong's boats and sunk
- three other very valuable prizes, captured, manned by prize crews, and ordered into port.

Of these last three ships listed in Niles' Register, one may have been Fanny. Another may have been the Sir Alexander Ball, which General Armstrong captured after a short engagement some 80 miles (130 km) west of Lisbon. Sir Alexander Ball had six men wounded, two probably fatally. Champlin sent her crew into Lisbon, and sent her with a prize crew for America. However, HMS Niemen recaptured Sir Alexander Ball and by 20 July 1814 she was at Halifax, Nova Scotia, being condemned as a prize to Niemen.

Of the prizes the General Armstrong captured and ordered to port, about a third were recaptured. Battle-damaged and short-manned, they were fairly easily recaptured. Niles' Register details the plight of one such captured vessel:

Shifting Owners! The prize schooner to the General Armstrong (lately arrived at an Eastern Port) was formerly the Matilda, American privateer. She was captured on the Brazil coast, some months since, by the Lion, British privateer ship of 28 guns, after severe action, recaptured going into England by the late U.S. Brig Argus, re-captured going into France by a British 74, and again re-captured by the American privateer Armstrong.

General Armstrong arrived in home port in late July 1814. Samuel Reid took over as captain and departed Sandy Hook on 9 September 1814, a few weeks before the fateful Battle of Fayal.

== Legacy ==
Claims for damages arising out of the General Armstrong's sinking lasted for over 70 years. One such claim drove the plot of The Senator, a popular play of the 1890s later adapted into a silent film.
