= USS Reid (DD-292) =

Clemson-class destroyer

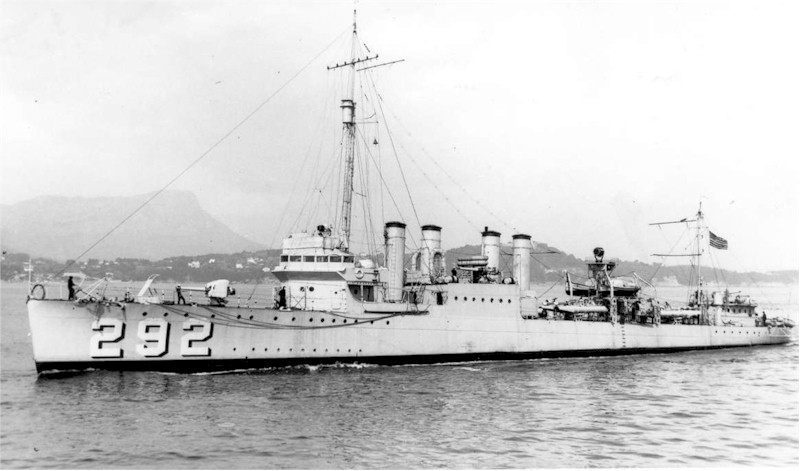
- USS Reid (DD-292)

History

United States
- Namesake: Samuel Chester Reid
- Builder: Bethlehem Shipbuilding Corporation, Squantum Victory Yard
- Laid down: 9 September 1919
- Launched: 15 October 1919
- Commissioned: 3 December 1919
- Decommissioned: 1 May 1930
- Stricken: 22 October 1930
- Fate: Sold for scrapping, 17 January 1931

General characteristics
- Class & type: Clemson-class destroyer
- Displacement: 1,215 tons
- Length: 314 feet 4 inches (95.81 m)
- Beam: 31 feet 8 inches (9.65 m)
- Draft: 9 feet 10 inches (3.00 m)
- Propulsion: 26,500 shp (20 MW); geared turbines, 2 screws
- Speed: 34 knots (63 km/h)
- Range: 4,900 nmi (9,100 km); @ 15 kt
- Complement: 122 officers and enlisted
- Armament: 4 × 5" 5 in (130 mm); 1 × 3 in (76 mm); 12 × 21 inch (533 mm) torpedo tubes

The second USS Reid (DD-292) was a Clemson-class destroyer in the United States Navy following World War I. She was named for Samuel Chester Reid.

== History ==
Reid was laid down by the Bethlehem Shipbuilding Corporation, Squantum, Massachusetts, 9 September 1919; launched 15 October 1919; sponsored by Mrs. Joseph W. Powell; and commissioned 3 December 1919.

Assigned to Squadron 3, Atlantic Fleet, Reid completed shakedown off Cuba in February 1920; participated in battle practice in March; and on 26 April put into New York. Underway again on 1 May, she steamed south again, touched at Key West, then cruised off the east coast of Mexico until mid-June. By 6 July she was at Newport, Rhode Island, whence she made several runs to New York prior to shifting to Charleston, South Carolina toward the end of September. For almost 3 years she remained on the east coast, operating out of Charleston, Newport, Rhode Island and Yorktown, Virginia. Such coastal operations were occasionally interrupted for brief periods of inactivity at Charleston, due to cuts in personnel.

In late January 1923 Reid returned to Guantanamo Bay for winter maneuvers, and in February she continued on to the Panama Canal Zone for battle practice. By the end of March she was back in Cuba, from where she returned to Newport and exercises off the east coast. In the winter of 1924, she repeated her Caribbean operations; but, in the spring, headed east for duty in European waters.

On 28 June she arrived at Cherbourg, France, and on 1 July joined the Light Cruiser Squadron. During that month she visited various Baltic and North Sea ports. In mid-August she conducted airplane patrols off Iceland, and in September she steamed into the Mediterranean. She remained in the western Mediterranean into November, and then proceeded, via Crete and Greece, to Turkey. During the next 2 months, she patrolled the eastern basin, calling at ports in the Levant and Egypt, and, in February 1925, resumed operations off France and Tunisia.

Reid departed the Mediterranean in early May, and, after calls at French and British ports, crossed the Atlantic, arriving at New York on 16 July. By the end of August she had resumed operations out of Newport and in September she again steamed south for exercises in the Caribbean. In December she underwent an overhaul at Philadelphia, then returned to the Caribbean.

Attached to the Scouting Fleet for the next 4 years, she continued to alternate east coast training cruises with Caribbean and Gulf of Mexico operations. From 24 April to 12 June 1927, she participated in the second Nicaraguan campaign - cruising off that coast, delivering supplies and mail to Marine detachments ashore, and assisting in the collecting of arms from allied forces.

== Fate ==
In 1929 Reid was designated for inactivation. She completed her last cruise at Philadelphia 30 August 1929 and was decommissioned there 1 May 1930. Struck from the Navy list 22 October 1930, she was sold for scrapping to the Boston Iron & Metal Company, Baltimore, Maryland, 17 January 1931.
