= Fanny (1811 ship) =

History

Denmark–Norway
- Builder: Norway
- Launched: 1807
- Captured: c.1810

United Kingdom
- Name: Fanny
- Owner: 1811: Harrison; 1812:James Brotherston & John Begg
- Acquired: 1811
- Captured: 19 April 1814; recaptured 18 May 1814
- Fate: Last listed 1833

General characteristics
- Tons burthen: 387 (bm)
- Sail plan: 3 masts
- Complement: 45
- Armament: 1810:10 × 9-pounder guns; 1812:16 × 9-pounder guns + 2 swivel guns; 1815:10 × 12-pounder carronades

Fanny was launched in Norway in 1807 under an unknown name and was captured around 1810 during the Gunboat War. She entered English records in 1811 as an armed merchantman that sailed between Liverpool and South America. On 19 April 1814, the American privateer schooner General Armstrong captured her, though shortly thereafter the British Royal Navy recaptured her. The insurance and marine salvage issues involved gave rise to three notable court cases. Fanny returned to the West Indies trade in 1815 under new owners. She was last listed in 1833.

== Career ==
Fanny was launched in Norway in 1807 and was captured by the British during the Gunboat War. She first appears in Lloyd's Register in 1811. She underwent coppering and a thorough repair that year. Her master was Huntley and her owner Harrison. Her trade was first Brazil and then Liverpool—Brazil.

In 1812, James Laughton replaced Huntley as Fanny's master. (Note: James was the father of Sir John Knox Laughton. John Knox's older brother was christened James Brotherston Laughton. John Knox's Who's Who entry describes his father as 'master mariner and in times of war captain of a privateer'.) Also, W.Begg replaced Harrison as owner.

On 5 December 1812 Laughton acquired a letter of marque against America for Fanny.

Fanny sailed from Falmouth 26 August 1813 to Rio de Janeiro in convoy with about 30 other vessels and a Royal Navy escort. For the return voyage, Laughton sought permission from the station admiral to return home without convoy. (Convoying reduced the sailing speed of the average vessel by 0.2 to 0.6 knots. Captains of faster vessels therefore had an incentive to sail outside the convoy system.) Laughton hired thirty additional men and took on board some additional arms. The station admiral thought Fanny was competent to defend herself and permitted the solo voyage. On 8 March 1814 Fanny left Maranham for Liverpool.

=== Battle with General Armstrong ===
At about midday on 18 April, Fanny was near the Irish coast when General Armstrong, captain Guy R. Champlin, from New York City, sighted her. Due to squally weather, General Armstrong did not immediately engage, but shadowed Fanny until early the following day, when General Armstrong closed to pistol shot range and opened fire. The faster and better armed privateer inflicted significant damage on Fanny, the privateer's long 42-pounder gun being particularly devastating.

The musket fire from the schooner was so severe that it was impossible to maintain station on the quarterdeck. Fanny returned fire and caused some damage to the American. However after about an hour of close combat, never out of pistol shot, Laughton struck her colours. One of the severely injured was one of Fanny's co-owners, John Begg, who later recovered from his injuries and continued his trade with South America.

Captain Champlin wrote in his log book:

April 19th. [1814] Lat. 51.58, captured the British ship Fanny, from Pernambuco bound to Liverpool with a valuable cargo of cotton, coffee and tallow, burthen 337 tons, 16 guns 9 and 12 pounders, and 45 men, manned and ordered her in. Engaged the Fanny forty minutes before she struck her colours; she had six men severely wounded and one killed; her hull rigging and sails were considerably cut up; the Armstrong received no damage.

Captain Laughton wrote to his employer:

She had scarcely a shroud left standing, nor one brace, the sails completely reduced, several gun carriages disabled, not a breeching left whole, one shot between wind and water, several others through different parts of her hull, the maintopsail and topgallant yards shot through, not a running rope but what was cut to pieces, a complete wreck on the quarter deck, the second mate, my brother, killed by my side, and six others wounded, five severely, one slightly.

Fanny's crew transferred to the General Armstrong and she put a prize crew on Fanny. Later that day the American schooner encountered Principe, Captain da Silva, a Portuguese vessel en route from Maranham to Liverpool. Champlin transferred 130 prisoners, including Laughton and his crew, to Principe. They arrived in Hoylake, England, on 23 April, when Principe ran on shore.

=== Subsequent events ===
Laughton sent a letter to James Brotherston describing the loss of Fanny. On 25 April, James Brotherston filed a claim for total loss with his insurers abandoning all interest in the ship to the insurers. Fanny was insured for £7,000 and the freight was insured on 22 April [sic] for £4,000

Sceptre recaptured Fanny on 12 May, and returned, arriving off Skelling Rock on the west coast of Ireland on 8 June. A Russian man-of-war ran afoul of Fanny in The Downs on 18 June, causing Fanny to lose a mast and suffer other damage. She arrived in Gravesend on 24 June. Fanny finally arrived in Liverpool on 26 September and the cargo of cotton, coffee and tallow was delivered to the consignee.

The High Court of Admiralty awarded Scepter's captain and crew the following salvage money:

First class share Captain	£605 7s 2d	Second class shares	£84 0s 2d	Third class shares	£50 8s 0¼d	Fourth class shares	£10 16s 4½d
Fifth class shares Able seamen	£7 4s 3d	Sixth class shares Ordinary seamen	£3 12s 1½d	Seventh class shares Landsmen	£2 8s 1d	Eighth class shares Boys	£1 4s 0½d

Following the discharge of her cargo, the ship was sold and the underwriters recovered about £2310.

=== Court cases ===
These subsequent events gave rise to three civil claims:

==== Davidson v. Case ====
Fanny and the freight (charges) were insured separately. An abandonment to the underwriter on the ship transfers the freight subsequently earned incident to the ship. Therefore where ship and freight were insured by separate sets of underwriters and the ship being a general ship, was captured and ship and freight were abandoned to the respective underwriters, who paid each a total loss; and the ship being recaptured; performed her voyage and earned freight; which was received from the consignee for the use of those who were legally entitled thereto. It was held that the underwriter on ship was entitled to recover the freight charges.

==== Brotherston and Another v. Barber ====
Brotherston and Another had insured Fanny's cargo against loss. Barber was the insurer. Brotherston claimed that he was due the full sum insured as a total loss. At the time of the claim this was the case and he had abandoned all rights to the vessel. The court found that the plaintiffs were only due a partial loss.

==== The Fanny [1 Dods 443] ====
The Portuguese owners of the cargo contested Sceptre's claim for marine salvage. They contended that their property was neutral in this conflict and would not have been declared as a prize in an American prize court. The Crown contended that lading the goods on an armed merchant vessel of one of the conflicting states surrendered this neutrality to that state. The courts found in favour of Sceptre, agreeing that the cargo owner had forfeited neutrality by lading his goods on an armed merchant vessel from one of the warring states.

This case is often cited in text books of international law.

=== Return to service ===
The Register of Shipping for 1815 lists Fanny, prize, built in 1807, of 387 tons (bm), with W. Reay, master, Foreshaw, owner, and trade Liverpool—St Thomas. She then traded widely under different masters and owners. She underwent a good repair in 1829, and received a new bottom in 1831. The data below is from the Register of Shipping.

Year	Master	Owner	Trade
1820	W. Reay	Foreshaw	Liverpool—St Thomas
1821	W. Reay; W. Thomas	Foreshaw; S. Parker	Liverpool—St Thomas; Liverpool—New Orleans
1822	W. Thomas	S. Parker	Liverpool—New Orleans
1823	W. Thomas	S. Parker	Liverpool—New Orleans
1825	Feard	Laing	Plymouth coaster
1830	Spaggon	Laing	London—Petersburg
1833	Bowser	Laing	Sidmouth—London

== Fate ==
Lloyd's Register does not list Fanny after 1833. (The Register of Shipping did not publish after 1833.)
