= Samuel Chester Reid =

United States Navy officer

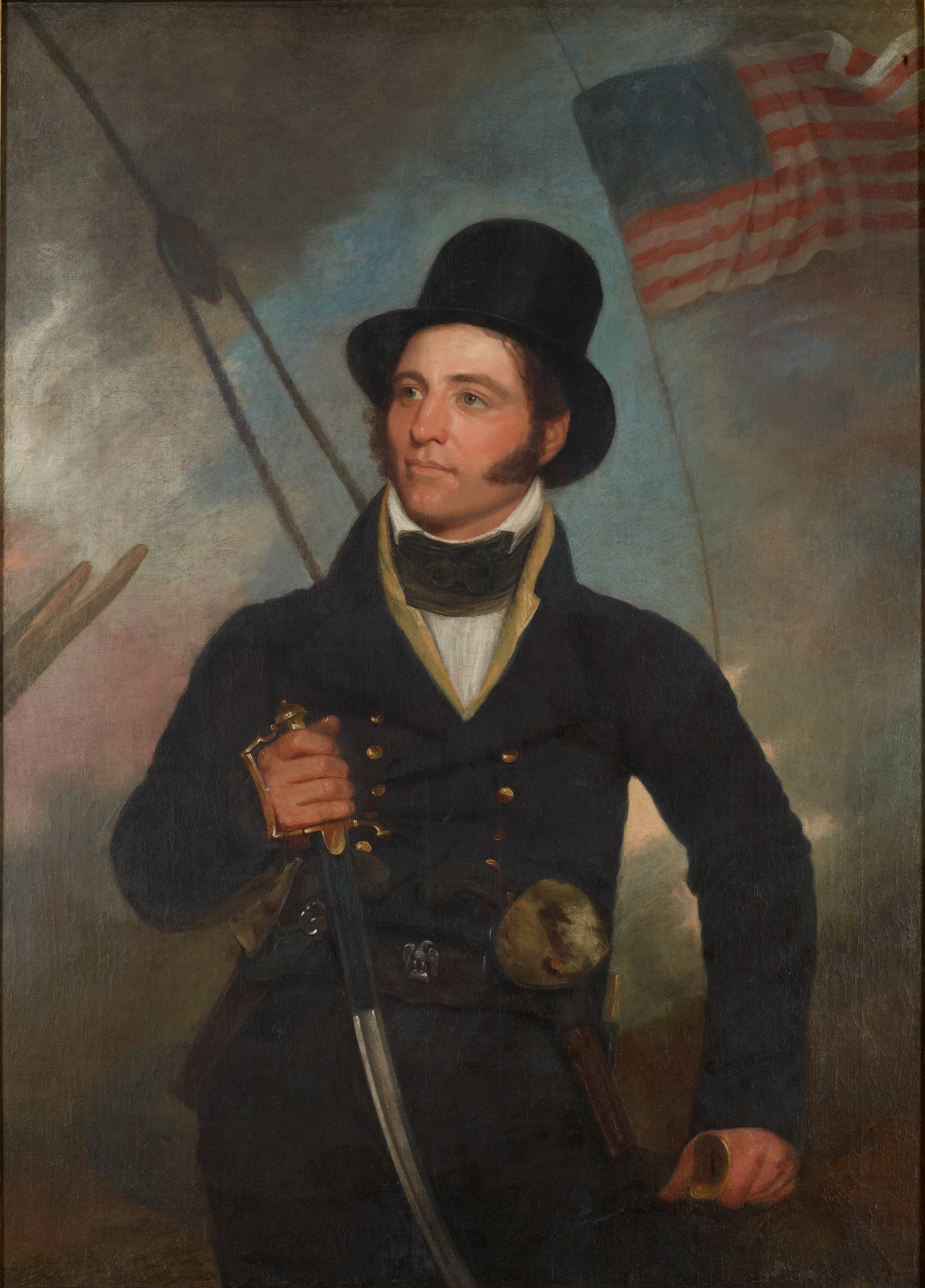
- Portrait by John Wesley Jarvis, c. 1815
- Born: August 24, 1783; Norwich, Connecticut, US
- Died: January 28, 1861 (aged 77); New York City, New York, US
- Military career
- Branch: United States Navy
- Service years: 1794–1844
- Rank: Master
- Commands: General Armstrong
- Conflicts: War of 1812; Capture of Fanny; Battle of Fayal

Samuel Chester Reid (24 August 1783 – 28 January 1861) was an officer in the United States Navy who commanded a privateer during the War of 1812. He is also noted for having helped design the 1818 version of the flag of the United States, which first established the rule of keeping thirteen stripes and adding one star for each U.S. state.

== Early life and family ==
Reid was born in Norwich, Connecticut, to John and Rebecca (Chester) Reid. John Reid, a lieutenant in the British Navy, was captured during the American Revolutionary War before resigning and joining the American side. Rebecca Chester's father, John Chester, was among the soldiers at Bunker Hill, and afterward a member of the Connecticut convention that ratified the United States constitution.

== Naval career ==
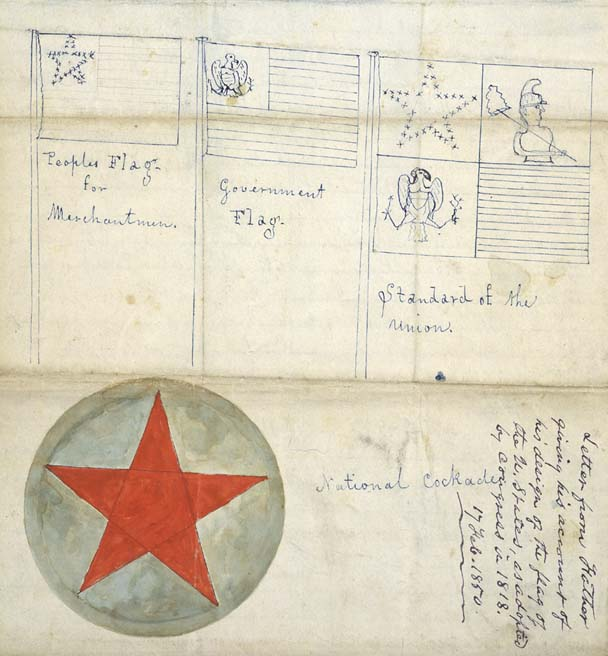
Reid's sketches of his designs, from an 1850 letter

Reid joined the United States Navy in 1794. He served in Constellation with Commodore Thomas Truxtun and in 1803 became master of the brig Merchant. During the War of 1812 he commanded the privateer General Armstrong. One notable capture was that of the British merchantman Fanny, notable because of the legal cases that arose from her capture and recapture. At the Battle of Fayal Reid inflicted severe casualties on boats from a British Royal Navy squadron en route to Jamaica and Louisiana. During the battle, Reid had to scuttle his ship and he and his crew made it to shore, suffering 2 men killed and 7 men wounded. Andrew Jackson credited Reid's action with delaying the British squadron and so aiding General Jackson's defense of New Orleans, a theory dismissed by modern historians. The battle was the subject of many popular prints.

== Flag design ==
In January 1817, Reid was asked by Representative Peter H. Wendover for advice in the design of a new U.S. flag. The flag then in use had fifteen stars and fifteen stripes; it had not been updated to reflect the five new states which had joined the union since that version of the flag was implemented in 1795. Wendover was the head of a congressional committee tasked with investigating possible alterations to the flag. Together, Wendover and Reid decided that the best way to honor all twenty states was to restore the number of stripes to the original thirteen, have twenty stars on the canton, and add a new star each time a new state joined the union.

Reid sketched three flag designs, one for general use which featured the twenty stars arranged in the shape of a larger star, one for use on government vessels and buildings which featured an eagle on the canton instead of stars, and one for use on ceremonial occasions which featured a different element (stars, stripes, the Great Seal, and the Goddess of Liberty) on each of the flag's four quarters. Wendover and his congressional committee adopted Reid's general-use flag, but never seriously considered his other two designs. Wendover drafted a bill which stipulated that the thirteen-stripe, twenty-star design become the new official flag of the United States. The bill passed and was signed into law as the Flag Act of 1818 by President James Monroe on April 4, 1818. The pattern of the stars was later changed from Reid's "great star" design to four rows of five stars each.

Reid was appointed master in the Navy in 1844 and died at New York 28 January 1861. He is interred at Green-Wood Cemetery in Brooklyn, New York. Four ships were given the name USS Reid in his honor.

His daughter, Mary Isabel Reid, married in 1861 Italian-American officer Luigi Palma di Cesnola, who later received the Medal of Honor for his actions during the American Civil War (1863), served as the United States consul in Cyprus (1866–1877) and became the first director of the Metropolitan Museum of Art in New York (1879-1904). His son Samuel Graham Reid, Sr., published and edited the Montgomery Advertiser.
