= Battle of Fayal =

- Part of the War of 1812
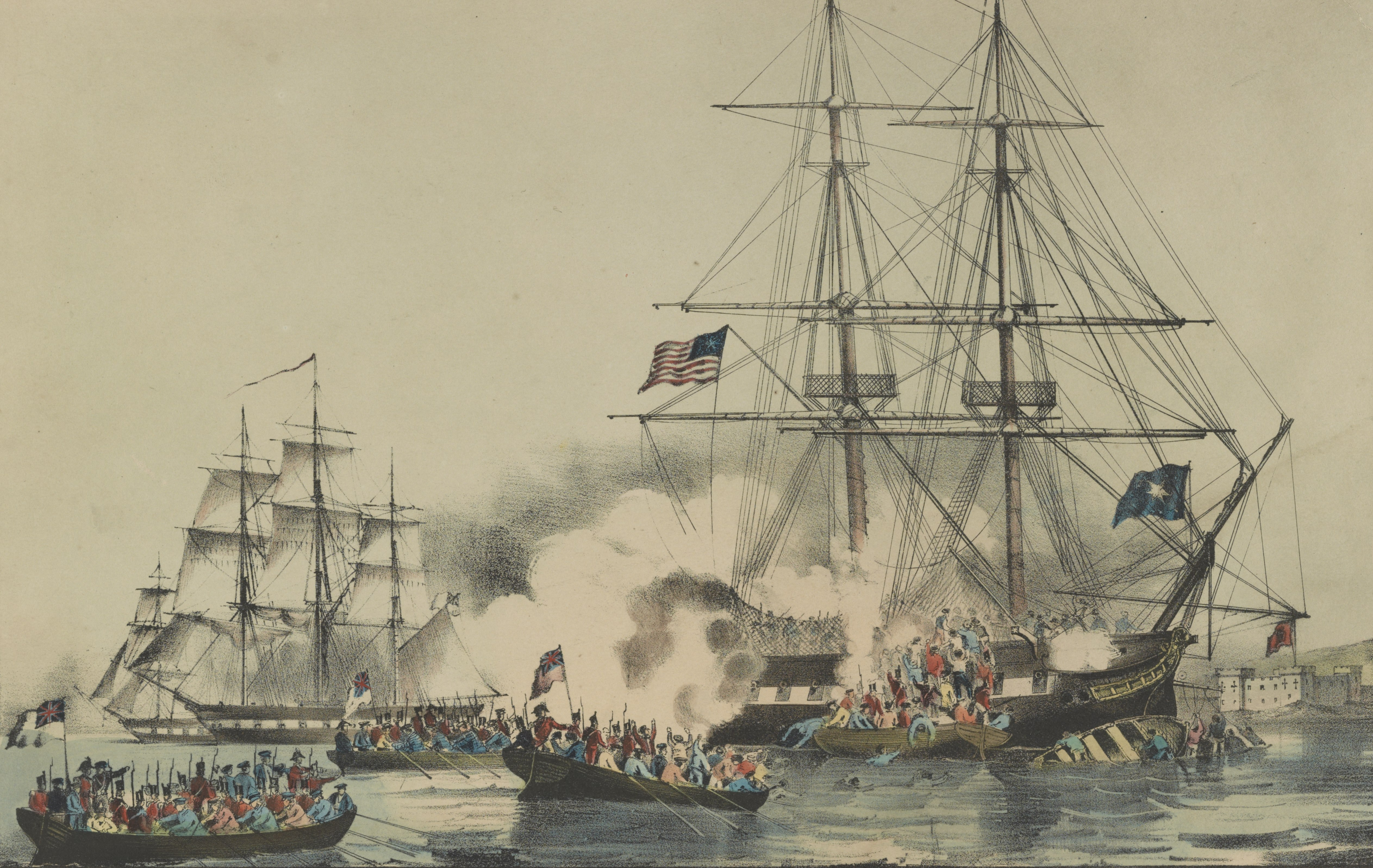
- An American illustration of the battle
Date	September 26–27, 1814
Location	Horta, Faial Island
Result	See Aftermath section

Belligerents
United States	United Kingdom

Commanders and leaders
Samuel Chester Reid	Robert Lloyd (WIA); William Matterface †

Strength
1 brig 90 sailors	1 ship of the line 1 frigate 1 brig-sloop 12 armed boats

Casualties and losses
2 killed 7 wounded 1 brig scuttled	36 killed 93 wounded 2 armed boats sunk 2 armed boats captured

The Battle of Fayal was fought on September 26–27, 1814, during the War of 1812. It occurred near the Portuguese village of Horta on Faial Island, (Note: Fayal is an antiquated spelling. Today the island's name is usually spelled "Faial" in both Portuguese and English.) in the Azores. A Royal Navy squadron on its way to Jamaica and Louisiana attacked the American privateer General Armstrong while she was at anchor in Horta. After repulsing two attacks from armed boats sent by the squadron, the Americans scuttled General Armstrong the following morning to prevent its capture. The British squadron subsequently attempted to land on Faial Island to continue fighting the Americans, but were prevented from doing so by the island's governor and the American consul-resident. The squadron eventually set sail for Louisiana.

== Background ==
In late 1814, the 74-gun HMS Plantagenet, commanded by Captain Robert Lloyd, set sail for the West Indies with the 38-gun frigate HMS Rota and the 18-gun brig-sloop HMS Carnation as part of the planned British invasion of Louisiana. On the night of September 26, the three ships were in the Fayal Roadstead when they spotted the American privateer General Armstrong, a 7-gun brig with a complement of approximately 90 men. She was commanded by Captain Samuel Chester Reid. Lloyd ordered a pinnace under Lieutenant Robert Faussett be sent from Plantagenet to ascertain the nationality of General Armstrong. When the British came within gun range of the American vessel and requested the crew identify themselves, Reid declared he would open fire if they came any closer.

== Battle ==
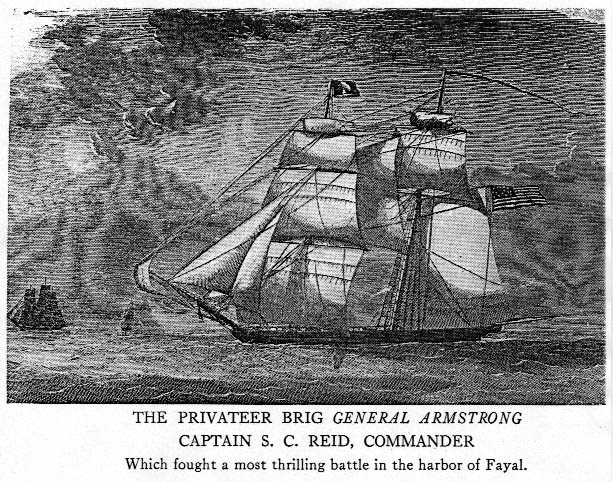
"The Privateer Brig General Armstrong Captain S. C. Reid Commander. Which fought a thrilling battle in the Harbor of Fayal."

Faussett was unable to stop his boat in the rough tides, and it drifted too close to General Armstrong. The Americans proceeded to open fire with their 9-pound long guns at the pinnace. Two men were killed and seven others wounded before the pinnace could retire out of range. Carnation immediately moved in and anchored in front of the American ship to begin negotiations. When discussions failed, and since General Armstrong had fired the first shot in a neutral port, Carnation cut her cable and lowered four boats filled with boarding parties towards General Armstrong, while Reid moved his ship closer to shore. The first boarding attempt occurred at around 8:00 pm. When the Americans observed the incoming boats they maneuvered again to receive them. In the following engagement, Carnation was kept out of range by American fire and the boats were repulsed with a loss estimated by Reid at 20 men killed and 20 more wounded. One American was killed and another wounded.

At about 9:00 pm, 12 boats armed with carronades and filled with 180 officers, sailors and marines from Plantagenet and Rota were towed into battle by Carnation, which stopped out of the range of General Armstrong. The boats divided into three divisions for another attack. Lieutenant William Matterface commanded the boats and Carnation provided covering fire. Lloyd anchored Rota and Plantagenet a few miles away, and neither participated in the engagement. Just after 9:00 pm, the British boats advanced, but accurate American fire and strong currents kept Carnation from closing the range and she was damaged. The boats did not reach General Armstrong until about midnight, largely because of the current but also due to where Lloyd had stopped his ships. While the Americans waited, they offloaded three of their cannon and erected a shore battery. When the British arrived, they attempted to board General Armstrong. However, the Americans sank two of the attacking boats before they could get close, captured two more, and killed several boarders with swords and muskets at point-blank range. Matterface and several other officers were killed, resulting no serviceman of sufficient rank being capable of leading the remaining attackers.

Elias Jose Ribeiro, the governor of Fayal, described the British casualties in a letter to the American ambassador to Portugal, Thomas Sumter Jr.:

The loss of the British was most extraordinary; their consul told me that he knew the list of the killed and wounded to amount to one hundred and sixteen, and it is supposed to have been much greater, for I myself saw three of the twelve boats without one person in them, and as they retreated I saw that one had only two on board, another only five, others only seven or eight. Of the killed were four officers; of the wounded few survived, as they were all wounded dangerously. I only wondered that any escaped to tell the story; for no attack could have been conducted in worse order.

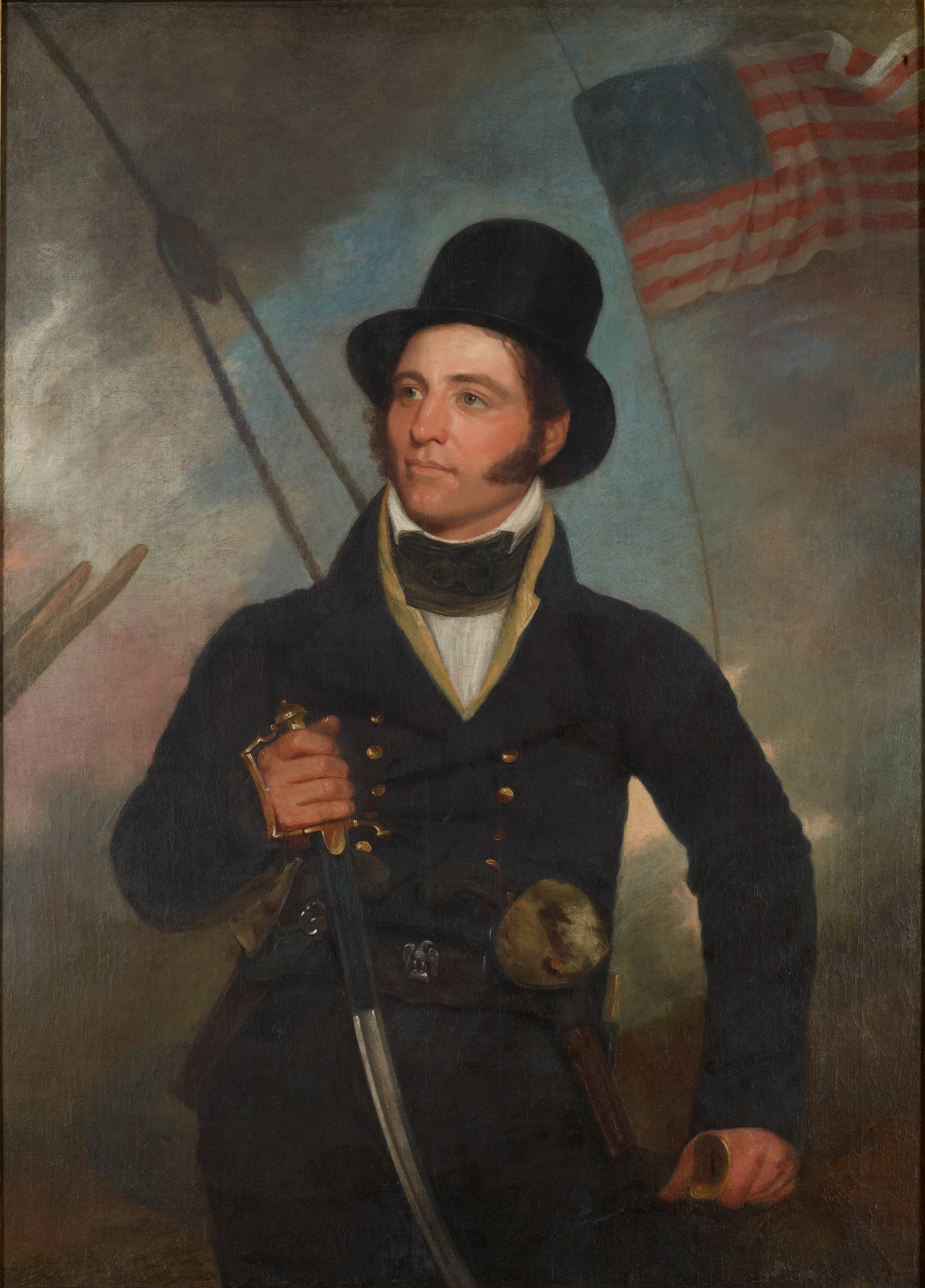
1815 portrait of Reid by John Wesley Jarvis

The British suffered in total 36 men killed and 93 wounded, while the Americans had lost two killed and seven wounded, including Reid who was hit with a musket ball. The main action had lasted over a half hour, during which Reid's men had fired nails, knife blades, brass buttons, and other makeshift projectiles from their cannon, which caused severe injuries to those they wounded. Following the failure of their attack, the British boarding parties slowly rowed back to their ships, reaching them at 2:00 am on September 27. Lloyd's response to the attack's failure was to send Carnation back to destroy General Armstrong after daylight but when she arrived, American fire caused further damage, leading Carnation to break off her attack. Carnation returned again but Reid had already chosen to scuttle his ship by firing one of his swivel guns straight through the hull. The vessel was boarded while it sank and the British set the ship's sails on fire before leaving.

== Aftermath ==
Reid and his crew escaped to shore. The British wanted to land a detachment to search for the Americans but the Portuguese governor and the resident American consul John Bass Dabney prevented them from doing this. Lloyd's squadron subsequently set sail for the Americas, ending any possibilities of further conflict. Reid and the crew of General Armstrong were credited by the American public with helping delay the British attack on New Orleans in 1815 and when they returned to the United States to a heroes welcome. However, later historical analysis showed that this was likely not the case.

== See also ==
- Battle of Rappahannock River
- Battle of Doro Passage
