= List of single-ship actions =

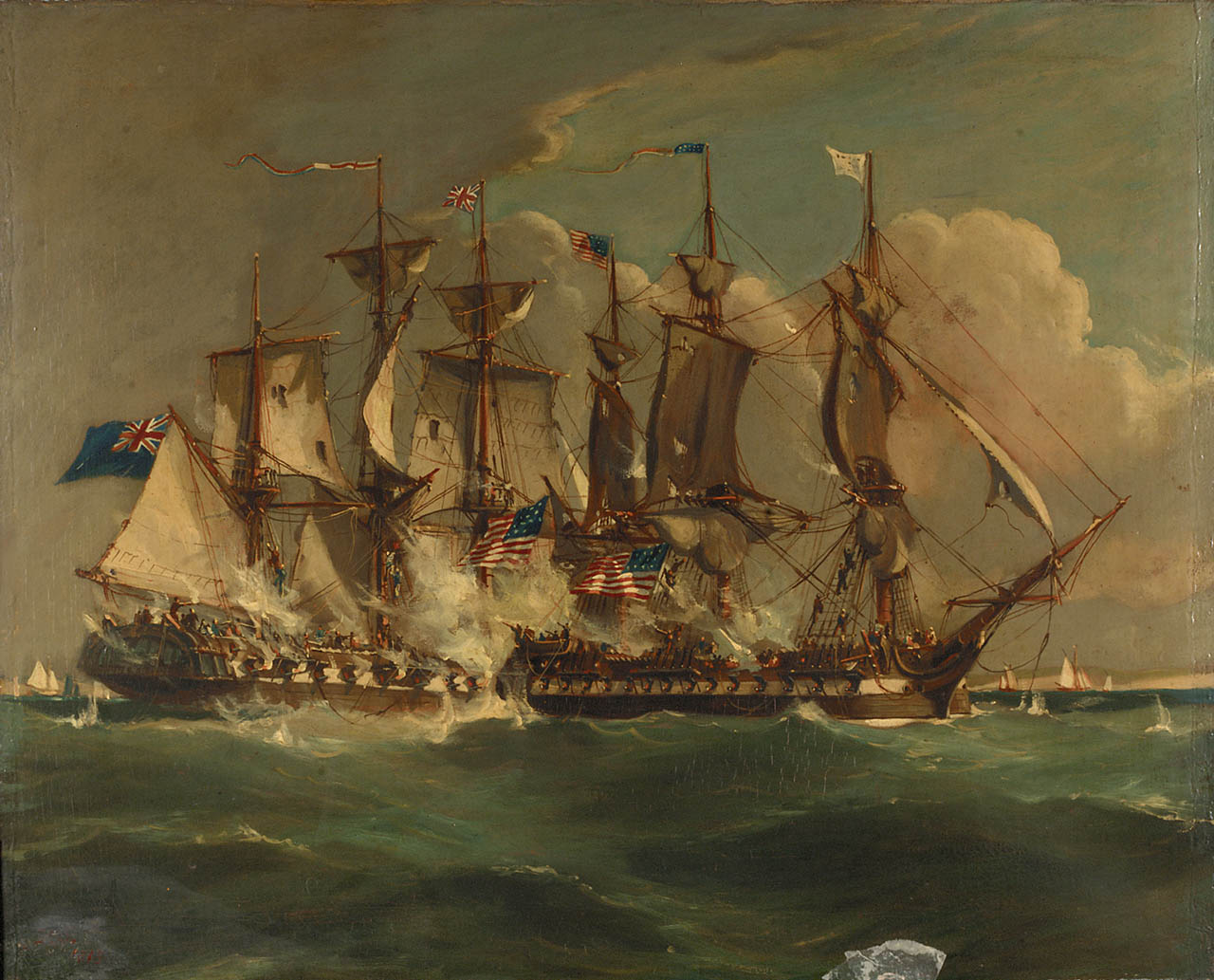
The capture of USS Chesapeake, a single-ship action of the War of 1812

A single-ship action is a naval engagement fought between two warships of opposing sides, excluding submarine engagements; it is called so because there is a single ship on each side. The following is a list of notable single-ship actions.

== Single-ship actions ==
=== Anglo-Spanish War ===
- 1579, March 1 – Golden Hind captures the Spanish galleon Nuestra Señora de la Concepción.

=== Third Anglo-Dutch War ===
- 1674, February 13 – HMS Tyger captures Schaeckerloo (part of the Dutch fleet that conducted the Dutch Raid on North America) outside Cádiz.

=== Great Northern War ===
- 1709, December 12 – Swedish frigate Falken effectively destroys the Danish frigate Maagen in the Gdańsk Bay
- 1712, late May – Swedish frigate Vita Örn battles the Danish frigate Høyenhald to a draw off Hanö
- 1712, June/July – Danish frigate Løvendals Galley captures the Swedish privateer Svenska Vapnet off Skagen
- 1712, September 8 – Swedish frigate Vita Örn sinks the Danish frigate Hejren off Møn
- 1714, July 26–27 – Danish frigate Løvendals Galley battles the Swedish privateer Olbing Galley to a draw off Lindesnes
- 1715, April 12 – Swedish frigate Vita Örn captures the Danish frigate Ørnen off Dornbusch

=== Golden Age of Piracy ===
- 1720, October 22 – A British merchant sloop commanded by former privateer Jonathan Barnet captures the pirate sloop William and its owner John Rackham.

=== War of the Austrian Succession ===
- 1743, June 20 – HMS Centurion captures the Spanish treasure galleon Nuestra Señora de la Covadonga
- 1746, 21 January – HMS Granado captures the French privateer Marianne

=== Seven Years War ===
- 1761, 1 January – HMS Trent captures the French merchant frigate Bien Aimé.

=== American Revolutionary War ===
- 1776, July 27 – USS Reprisal and HMS Shark have an inconclusive engagement
- 1777, 12 July – British merchantman Pole repulses the privateer American Tartar
- 1778, April 24 – USS Ranger captures HMS Drake (details)
- 1778, December – the Bristol privateer Tartar has an inconclusive engagement with a French frigate
- 1779, March – the Bristol privateer Tartar has an inconclusive engagement with an American privateer
- 1779, May 7 – USS Providence captures HMS Diligent
- 1779, September 7 – Molly repels an American privateer
- 1779, September 10 – USS Morris defeats HMS West Florida in the Battle of Lake Pontchartrain.
- 1779, September 14 – HMS Pearl defeats the Spanish frigate Santa Mónica. (details)
- 1779, October 29 – the West Indiaman Mentor exchanges fire with a French frigate; the frigate withdraws
- 1779, November 11 – HMS Tartar captures the Spanish frigate Santa Margarita. (details)
- 1780, June 1 – USS Trumbull engages the British privateer Watt; both ships withdraw
- 1780, August 10 – HMS Flora defeats the French ship Nymphe in the first engagement thought to involve the carronade.(details)
- 1780, September 9 – HMS Keppel has an inconclusive, three-hour engagement with USS Saratoga
- 1781, January 9 – The sloop USS Saratoga captures the letter-of-marque Tonyn
- 1781, March 7 – Liverpool privateer Woolton captures French merchantman Sartine
- 1781, March 23 – British privateer Tarleton, of 14 guns, captures American letter of marque Tom Lee, of 12 guns.
- 1781, May 1 – HMS Canada captures the Spanish frigate Santa Leocadia. (details)
- 1781, September 6 – American privateer Congress captures the British sloop HMS Savage. (details)
- 1781, October 10 – the British privateer Goodrich has an inconclusive engagement with the American letter of marque St James
- 1781, late December – French privateer Terror of England captures and releases the letter of marque Molly
- 1782, February 28 – French frigate Bellone captures HMS Chaser
- 1782, April 6 – American privateer Tartar captures HMS Jane
- 1782, April 8 – Pennsylvania privateer Hyder Ally captures HMS General Monk. (details)
- 1782, 9 August – HMS Duc de Chartres captures the French brig Aigle
- 1782, August 12 – Frigate HMS Coventry inconclusively engages the French frigate Bellone
- 1782, October 7 – The American privateer Buccaneer captures the British merchant ship Chambers
- 1782, December 6 – HMS Ruby defeats the French ship Solitaire. (details)
- 1783, January 20 – HMS Resolution captures the Dutch privateer Flushinger
- 1783, January 22 – HMS Hussar captures the French frigate Sybille. (details)

=== French Revolutionary Wars ===
- 1793, May 13 – HMS Iris and Citoyenne Française conduct an inconclusive but sanguinary engagement
- 1793, June 18 – HMS Nymphe captures the Cléopâtre (details)
- 1793, September 3 – French frigate Citoyen captures and ransoms the Guineaman Courier.
- 1793, December 1 – The British packet ship Antelope captures the French privateer Atlante.
- 1794, May 29 – HMS Carysfort recaptures HMS Castor (details)
- 1794, July 28 – French privateer Guillotine captures merchant vessel Sandown
- 1794, September 5 – Merchantmen Esther repulses Républicaine
- 1794, September 25 – Merchantman Bolton repulses a French privateer
- 1794, September – Enslaving ship Duke of Buccleugh repels attack by French privateer Pervie
- 1795 – The enslaving ship Æolus repels an attack by a French privateer
- 1795, January 4 – HMS Blanche captures Pique
- 1795, March 13 – HMS Lively captures the French frigate Tourterelle
- 1795, October 30 – The enslaving ship Lord Stanley repels an attack by a French 12-gun schooner privateer
- 1796, January – A French privateer captures the enslaving ship Ranger
- 1796, September – The enslaving ship Bud repels an attack by a French privateer
- 1796, November 20 – Merchantman Wilding engages a French privateer that blows up during the engagement
- 1796, May 25 – HMS Suffisante captures the privateer Revanche
- 1796, June 6 – HMS Unicorn captures French frigate Tribune
- 1796, October 8 & 9 – Merchant ship Backhouse repels attack by French privateer
- 1796, November 28 – The enslaving ship Tarleton repels two different French privateers on the same day, each engagement representing a single-ship action
- 1797, 29 January – French privateer Jeune Emilie captures the British merchant vessel Battalion
- 1797, March 13 – HMS Viper captures Nuestra Señora de la Piedad.
- 1797, June 1 – The French privateer Oiseau captures the British slave ship Britannia
- 1797, August 15 – HMS Alexander captures French privateer Coq
- 1797, August 29 – A French privateer captures the merchantman Ranger
- 1797, October – HMS Alexander captures French privateer Epicharis
- 1797, October – Merchant ship Backhouse repels attack by French privateer
- 1797, December 19 – Slave ship Eliza blows up while engaging a French privateer
- 1797, December 22 – HMS Phoebe captures the French frigate Néréide
- 1797, December 27 – HMS Caroline captures the Spanish ship St Raphael
- 1798, January – 11 HMS Racoon captures the French privateer Policrate
- 1798, April 2 – HMS Mars captures the French ship Hercule
- 1798, April 17 – HMS Recovery captures the French privateer Revanche
- 1798, July 4 – French brig Lodi in an inconclusive engagement with the English privateer brig Acquila (probably Eagle)
- 1798, June 21 – His Majesty's packet ship Princess Royal repels the French privateer Avanture.(details)
- 1798, August 7 – HMS Espoir captures the Genoese pirate Liguria
- 1798, September 18 – A French privateer captures the West Indiaman Agreeable
- 1798, September 27 – The French privateer President Parker captures the Guineaman Bud
- 1798, October 20 – HMS Racoon captures the French privateer Vigilante
- 1798, December 12 – HMS Perdrix captures the French privateer L'Armée d' Italie
- 1798, February 24 – French frigate Forte captures the East Indiaman Osterley, but then allows her to proceed.
- 1798, March 1 – HMS Sybille captures French frigate Forte.
- 1799, February 25 – French privateer Democrat captures merchantman Cicero
- 1799, March 18 – HM hired brig Telegraph captures French privateer Hirondelle
- 1799, April 13 – HMS Amaranthe captures the French letter of marque Vengeur.
- 1799, November 23 – Hired cutter Courier captures French privateer Guerrier
- 1799, November 26 – Merchant ship Barton repels attack by a French privateer
- 1799, December 2 – HMS Racoon captures French privateer Intrepide
- 1799, December 2 – the British merchantman Achilles captures the French privateer corvette Entreprenante
- 1799, December 26 – HMS Viper captures the French privateer Furet
- 1800, March 5 – HMS Phoebe captures the privateer Heureux
- 1800, March 31 – French privateer Minerve captures the United States letter of marque Minerva
- 1800, August 20 – HMS Seine captures the French ship Vengeance
- 1800, October 7 – French privateer Confiance captures British East Indiaman Kent
- 1800, October 8 – HMS Gipsy captures the French privateer Quidproquo
- 1800, October – American merchant ship Rebecca repels French privateer Malartic
- 1800, November 11 – East Indiaman Phoenix captures French privateer Malartic.
- 1800, November 13 – HMS Milbrook defeats and drives off the French privateer Bellone
- 1800, November 13 – HMS Albatross captures the privateer brig Adèle
- 1800, November 22 - HCS Intrepid repels a French privateer off Muscat
- 1801, January 17 – The French privateer Mon Oncle Thomas captures the Guineaman Leander
- 1801, February 19 – HMS Phoebe captures the French frigate Africaine (details)
- 1801, March 5 – French privateer Gironde captures the merchantman Bolton
- 1801, March 23 – HMS Albatross captures the French privateer Gloire
- 1801, April – British merchantman Union Island repels a Spanish privateer
- 1801, May – French privateer captures the British merchantman Union Island
- 1801, May 6 – HMS Speedy captures Spanish xebec frigate El Gamo (Details)*
- 1801, June 14 – Liverpool privateer General Keppel repels French privateer Mouche
- 1801, August 18 – HMS Guachapin captures Spanish letter of marque Theresa
- 1801, September 25 – HMS Pickle has an inconclusive engagement with a privateer flying the Spanish colors off Hispaniola.
- 1801, November 20 – A Spanish frigate of 44 guns captures the Liverpool privateer General Keppel

=== Quasi-War ===
- 1799, February 9 – USS Constellation captures the French frigate L'Insurgente (details)
- 1799, October 24 – Merchantman Washington drives off the French privateer frigate Bellone
- 1800, February 1 – USS Constellation defeats the French frigate La Vengeance (details)
- 1800, July 4 - USS Enterprise captures French privateer L'Aigle
- 1800, October 12 – USS Boston captures the French corvette Berceau (details)
- 1800, October 25 – USS Enterprise captures French privateer Flambeau (details)

=== First Barbary War ===
- 1801, August 1 – United States Navy warship USS Enterprise captures Tripolitanian corsair Tripoli near Malta. (details)

=== Napoleonic Wars ===
- 1803, May 18 – HMS Doris captures the French lugger Affronteur on the first day of the war.
- 1803, July 7 – French privateer Blonde captures the British privateer Young Nicholas
- 1803, July 16 – HMS Racoon captures French brig-corvette Lodi.
- 1803, August 13 – French privateer Bellone captures the East Indiaman Lord Nelson
- 1803, August 17 – HMS Racoon destroys French naval brig Mutine.
- 1803, August 27 – HMS Seagull recaptures the East Indiaman Lord Nelson
- 1803, October 15 – The British slave ship Tamer captures the French slave ship Braave
- 1803 – Guineaman Bedford repels an attack by a French privateer
- 1804, January 24 – Queen Charlotte repels an attack by a French privateer
- 1804, February 5 – HMS Eclair engages the 22-gun French privateer Grande Decide.
- 1804, March 21 – French privateer Blonde captures and sinks HMS Wolverine.
- 1804, March 9 – French privateer Grande Decide captures British merchantman Caldicot Castle
- 1804, March 25 or 28 – HMS Hippomenes captures French privateer Egyptienne
- 1804, April – A French privateer captures the slave ship Sarah and takes her and her cargo of slaves into Guadeloupe
- 1804, May 12 – A French privateer captures the slave ship Angola
- 1804, June 21 – HMS Hippomenes unsuccessfully engages the Guadeloupe privateer Buonaparte.
- 1804, July 15 – French privateer Dame Ambert captures HMS Lilly
- 1804, July 31 – HMS Tartar captures French privateer Hirondelle
- 1804, August 4 – French privateer General Augereau captures the West Indiaman William Heathcote
- 1804, August 14 – French frigate Poursuivante captures English merchantman Juno
- 1804, August 5 – Merchantman Britannia repels attack by French privateer General Ernouf
- 1804, January 26 – Merchantman Scarborough repels attack by a French privateer
- 1804, September 12 – Policy captures Dutch merchantman Swift
- 1804, December 27 – Slave ship Lord Nelson repels an attack by a French privateer
- 1804, late – Slave ship Thetis repels an attack by a French privateer
- 1805, February – the whaler Iris unsuccessfully attacks a Batavian vessel
- 1805, February 2 – Slave ship Elizabeth repels an attack by a French privateer
- 1805, February 8 – HMS Curieux captures French privateer Dame Ernouf
- 1805, February 13 – HMS San Fiorenzo captures French frigate Psyche
- 1805, March 10 – Private ship of war Kitty captures the Spanish private ship of war Felicity/Felicidad
- 1805, March 20 – French privateer Général Ernouf explodes during an engagement with HMS Renard
- 1805, May 16 – The French privateer Hirondelle captures Queen Charlotte
- 1805, July 19 – French frigate Topaze captures HMS Blanche
- 1805, August 10 – HMS Phoenix captures Didon
- 1805, August 16 – HMS Raisonable vs the French frigate Topaze
- 1805, October 13 – Spanish merchantman Nuestra Senora de Isiar (alias Joaquina), captures British privateer Antelope
- 1805, October 20 – British privateer Harmony fails to capture a Spanish privateer brig
- 1805, November – HMS Wolverine vs HMS Amethyst
- 1805, November 4 – French privateer Creole captures slaver and merchantman Esther
- 1805, November 28 – Inconclusive engagement between the French privateer Bellone and the East Indiaman Admiral Gardner
- 1805, November 30 – a French privateer captures the slave ship Lancaster
- 1806, January 23 – French privateer captures and sinks HMS Unique
- 1806, February 15 – HMS Grenada captures the French letter of marque Princess Murat
- 1806, February – French privateer Hebe captures British merchantman Shipley
- 1806, March 3–4 – French brig Observateur vs. an unknown British post ship
- 1806, May 11 – French ship Abeille captures HMS Alacrity
- 1806, May 14 – HMS Pallas vs French Minerve
- 1806, May 25 – Merchant ship Barton repels attack by French privateer Fairey
- 1806, June 21 – French frigate Piémontaise captures the East Indiaman Warren Hastings at 26°13′S 56°45′W
- 1806, July 19 – HMS Blanche captures French Guerrière
- 1806, August 2 – The fireship HMS Phosphorus repels an attack by the French privateer lugger Elize
- 1806, October 25 – Spanish privateer mistico Generalísimo captures HM gunboat Hannah
- 1806, October 26 – HMS Pitt captures the French privateer Superbe
- 1806, December 29 – HMS Spitfire captures French privateer Deux Frères
- 1807, January 3 – Pickle captures the French privateer Favorite
- 1807, March 14 – French privateer Alerte captures merchantman Highlander
- 1807, April 25 – French privateer Dame Villaret captures Wanstead
- 1807, August 19 – HMS Comus captures the Danish frigate Fredericksvaern.
- 1807, September 9 – A French privateer captures the British slave ship Lucy
- 1807, October 1 – British packet ship Windsor Castle captures the French privateer Jeune Richard. (details)
- 1807, October 17 – HMS Superieure captures the French privateer schooner Tape a L’Oeil.
- 1807, December 3 – HMS Curieux has an inconclusive engagement with French privateer Revanche.
- 1808, March 2 – HMS Sappho captures Danish privateer Admiral Yawl
- 1808, March 6–8 – HMS San Fiorenzo captures French frigate Piémontaise
- 1808, March 7 – A French privateer captures the slave ship Robert
- 1808, March 14 – HDMS Lougen engages in an inconclusive action with HMS Childers
- 1808, May 11 and 12 – HMS Wizard vs French 16-gun brig of war Requin, later captured by HMS Volage
- 1808, June 24 – HMS Salsette captures the Russian cutter Opyt
- 1808, July 5 and 6 – HMS Seahorse captures Turkish frigate Badere Zaffer
- 1808, July 16&17 – Active repelled a Spanish and a French privateer in two separate single-ship actions.
- 1808, August 11 – HMS Comet captures French corvette Sylphe
- 1808, September 6 – HMS Recruit vs French corvette Diligente
- 1808, September 29 – French navy corvette Départment-des-Landes captures HMS Maria
- 1808, October 3 – French brig Palinure captures HMS Carnation
- 1809, August 7 – The Liverpool merchantman Lascelles repels an attack by a French privateer
- 1809, late – The Liverpool merchantman Agreeable repels an attack by a French privateer
- 1810, January 11 – HMS Scorpion captures French brig Oreste
- 1810, 10 February – HMS Thistle captures the Dutch naval vessel Havik
- 1810, August 10 – His Majesty's Hired armed cutter Queen Charlotte drives off a substantially larger and more heavily armed French vessel.
- 1810, August 22 – the British letter of marque merchantman William Ashton repels an attack by a French privateer
- 1810, October 14 – HMS Briseis captures the French privateer schooner Sans Souci
- 1810, November 1 – The French privateer Spéculateur captures the merchant ship Leander
- 1811, early – HMS Gleaner captures an Ottoman polacca off Samos
- 1811, September 11 – HMS Diana captures the Dutch brig Zephyr off Manado
- 1811, October 29 – The French privateer Epervier captured the packet Chesterfield off Guernsey
- 1812, February 22 – HMS Victorious captures French ship Rivoli in Battle of Pirano
- 1812, July 21 – HMS Sealark captures the French privateer Ville de Caen
- 1812, December 1 – French privateer Sans Souci captures the South Seas whaler Frederick
- 1812, December 18 – HMS Spy repels an attack by a French privateer
- 1812, December 29 – HMS Royalist captures the French privateer lugger Rusé
- 1813, February 7 – HMS Amelia and the French frigate Aréthuse engage in an inconclusive but sanguinary four-hour night battle
- 1813, September 10 – French privateer cutter Renard destroys the schooner HMS Alphea
- 1813, October 9 – HMS Thunder captures the French privateer Neptune
- 1814, January 6 – the West Indiaman Cambridge repels an attack by a Carthaginian privateer just outside Havana
- 1814, March 27 – HMS Hebrus captures French frigate Étoile
- 1815, May 30 – HMS Rivoli captures the French frigate Melpomène off Naples.

=== War of 1812 ===
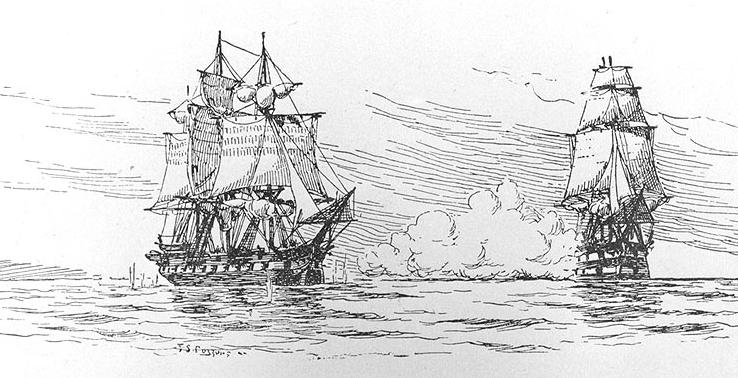
HMS Leopard (right) fires upon USS Chesapeake during the Chesapeake–Leopard affair.

- 1807, June 22 Chesapeake–Leopard affair – HMS Leopard boards USS Chesapeake
- 1811, May 16 Little Belt affair – USS President fires on HMS Little Belt
- 1812, June 18 – USS Essex captures HMS Alert
- 1812, July – the American privateer Matilda captures the British merchantman Ranger
- 1812, August 1 – the American privateer Yankee captures and burns the British merchantman Royal Bounty
- 1812, August 19 – USS Constitution defeats HMS Guerriere
- 1812, August 22 – HMS Barbados defeats US Revenue Cutter James Madison
- 1812, September 8 – French privateer brig Diligent (or Diligente or Diligence) captures the schooner HMS Laura
- 1812, September 16 – American privateer Rossie captures the packet Princess Amelia
- 1812, October 18 – USS Wasp defeats HMS Frolic
- 1812, October 18 – HMS Poictiers defeats USS Wasp
- 1812, October 25 – USS United States captures HMS Macedonian
- 1812, November 2 – British letter-of-marque Caledonia repels US privateer Retaliation
- 1812, November 21 – Merchantman John Tobin repels attack by American privateer brig Alfred
- 1812, November 22 – HMS Southampton captures USS Vixen
- 1812, December 11 – American privateer Saratoga captures the British letter of marque Rachel in the Battle of La Guaira
- 1812, December 29 – USS Constitution destroys HMS Java
- 1812, December – British merchantman Ramoncita repels attack by privateer Alexander, of Salem
- 1813, January 17 – HMS Narcissus captures USS Viper
- 1813, January 1 – The Falmouth packet Duke of Montrose repels an attack by an American privateer
- 1813, January 25 – The American privateer Dolphin captures the merchantman Hebe
- 1813, February 24 – USS Hornet defeats HMS Peacock
- 1813, March 11 – HMS Coquette and the American privateer General Armstrong have an inconclusive engagement
- 1813, March 22 – The British letter of marque Lion captures the American privateer Matilda
- 1813, April – The American letter of marque Ned captures the British armed merchantman Malvina
- 1813, April 14 – The American privateer Anaconda captures, plunders, and releases the Falmouth Post Office Packet Service's Express Packet
- 1813, April 13 – The American privateer Yorktown captures the Falmouth packet Ann
- 1813, May 23 – HMS Highflyer vs. Virginia privateer schooner Roger
- 1813, May 23 – The American privateer Young Teazer captures the Falmouth packet Ann
- 1813, May 28 – USS Georgiana captures the whaler Hector
- 1813, May 30 – The United States privateer Yankee captures the British merchant vessel Thames
- 1813, June 1 – HMS Shannon captures USS Chesapeake in the Battle of Boston Harbor
- 1813, June 9 – The Falmouth Post Office Packet Service's Duke of Montrose repels an attack by an American privateer
- 1813, June 24 – American privateer Yorktown captures Manchester
- 1813, August 5 – Privateer Decatur captures HMS Dominica
- 1813, August 14 – HMS Pelican captures USS Argus
- 1813, September 5 – USS Enterprise captures HMS Boxer
- 1813, September 23 – USS President captures HMS Highflyer
- 1813, October 22 – US Revenue Cutter Vigilant defeats Canadian privateer Dart
- 1813, December 14 – Sir William Bensley repels an attack by a 20-gun American privateer schooner
- 1813, December 25 – HMS Belvidera captures USS Vixen II
- 1814, January 11 – British merchantman Hibernia drives off the American privateer Comet
- 1814, February – HMS Epervier captures American privateer-brig Alfred
- 1814, February 14 – USS Constitution destroys HMS Pictou
- 1814, March 14 – Hannah repels an attack by the American privateer Jacob Johns
- 1814, March 28 – HMS Phoebe captures USS Essex in the Battle of Valparaiso
- 1814, April 19 – The American privateer General Armstrong captures the British letter-of-marque Fanny
- 1814, April 20 – HMS Shelburne, with HMS Orpheus approaching, captures USS Frolic
- 1814, April 29 – USS Peacock captures HMS Epervier
- 1814, May 1 – Falmouth packet Hinchinbrooke repels attack by American privateer Grand Turk
- 1814, June 22 – HMS Leander captures USS Rattlesnake
- 1814, June 28 – USS Wasp captures HMS Reindeer
- 1814, July 12 – American privateer Syren captures HMS Landrail
- 1814, July 12 – HMS Medway captures USS Syren
- 1814, August 17 – The transport Atlas repels an attack by the U.S. privateer York
- 1814, September 1 – USS Wasp sinks HMS Avon
- 1814, October – The packet ship Grace repelled an attach by a U.S. privateer
- 1814, October 11 – HMS Dispatch defeats the US Revenue Cutter Eagle
- 1814, October 11 – American privateer Prince de Neufchatel resists HMS Endymion
- 1814, December 20 – HMS Cockchafer captures the American letter of marque Java
- 1815, January 15 – HMS Endymion defeats USS President
- 1815, January 28 – American privateer Surprise captures the British merchantman Star
- 1815, February 9 – American privateer Kemp captures the Post Office Packet Service's packet Lady Mary Pelham
- 1815, February 11 – Post-office packet ship Walsingham repels an American privateer
- 1815, March 8 – HMS Barbadoes captures the American privateer Avon
- 1815, March 15 – American privateer Roger captures the British packet ship Windsor Castle
- 1815, March 23 – USS Hornet captures HMS Penguin
- 1815, April 27 – USS Hornet escapes after mistakenly engaging HMS Cornwallis.
- 1815, June 15 – USS Peacock captures Nautilus, a brig of the Bombay Marine of the East India Company

=== Argentine War of Independence ===
- 1825, January 25 – Buenos Aires privateer Tupac Amaru (ex-US Regent) captures the Spanish merchantman Triton

=== Suppression of the slave trade ===
- 1826, March 20 – Nettuno, a Brazilian slave ship and prize to HMS Esk, repels the pirate brig Caroline
- 1828, April 2 – HMS Black Joke captures Providentia
- 1828, May 1 – HMS Black Joke captures Presidenté
- 1829, February 1 – HMS Black Joke captures Almirante
- 1829, June 5 – HMS Pickle captures Voladora
- 1829, June 26 – HMS Monkey captures Midas
- 1830, September 7 – HMS Primrose captures Veloz Passagera (details)
- 1832, June 3 – HMS Speedwell captures the slaver Aquila off Cuba

=== Texas Revolution ===
- 1835, June 15 – USRC Ingham engages the Mexican schooner Montezuma.
- 1836, March 6 – Texas schooner Liberty captures the Mexican schooner Pelicano
- 1836, April 3 – Texas schooner Invincible sinks the Mexican schooner Montezuma.

=== War of the Confederation ===
- 1837, February 5 – Chilean brig Aquiles, which kept the port of Callao blocked, attacked the Confederate schooner Yanacocha and forced her to return to her anchorage.
- 1838, January 18 – Chilean corvette Libertad captured the Confederate corvette Confederación on the coast of Callao.

=== First Schleswig War ===
- 1849, June 27 – Prussian paddle steamer SMS Preussischer Adler duels inconclusively with Danish brig St. Croix off Brusterort

=== Crimean War ===
- 1853, November 17 – Russian steam frigate Vladimir captures Turkish/Egyptian steam frigate Pervaz Bahri in the Black Sea

=== American Civil War ===
- 1861, July 18 – USS St. Lawrence sinks privateer Petrel off Charleston, South Carolina
- 1863, January 11 – CSS Alabama sinks USS Hatteras off Galveston Island, Texas
- 1864, June 19 – USS Kearsarge sinks CSS Alabama off Cherbourg, France
- 1864, October 7 – USS Wachusett captures CSS Florida in Bahia Harbour, Brazil

=== Chincha Islands War ===
- 1865, November 26 – Chilean corvette Esmeralda captured the Spanish schooner Virgen de Covadonga. (details)

=== Franco-Prussian War ===
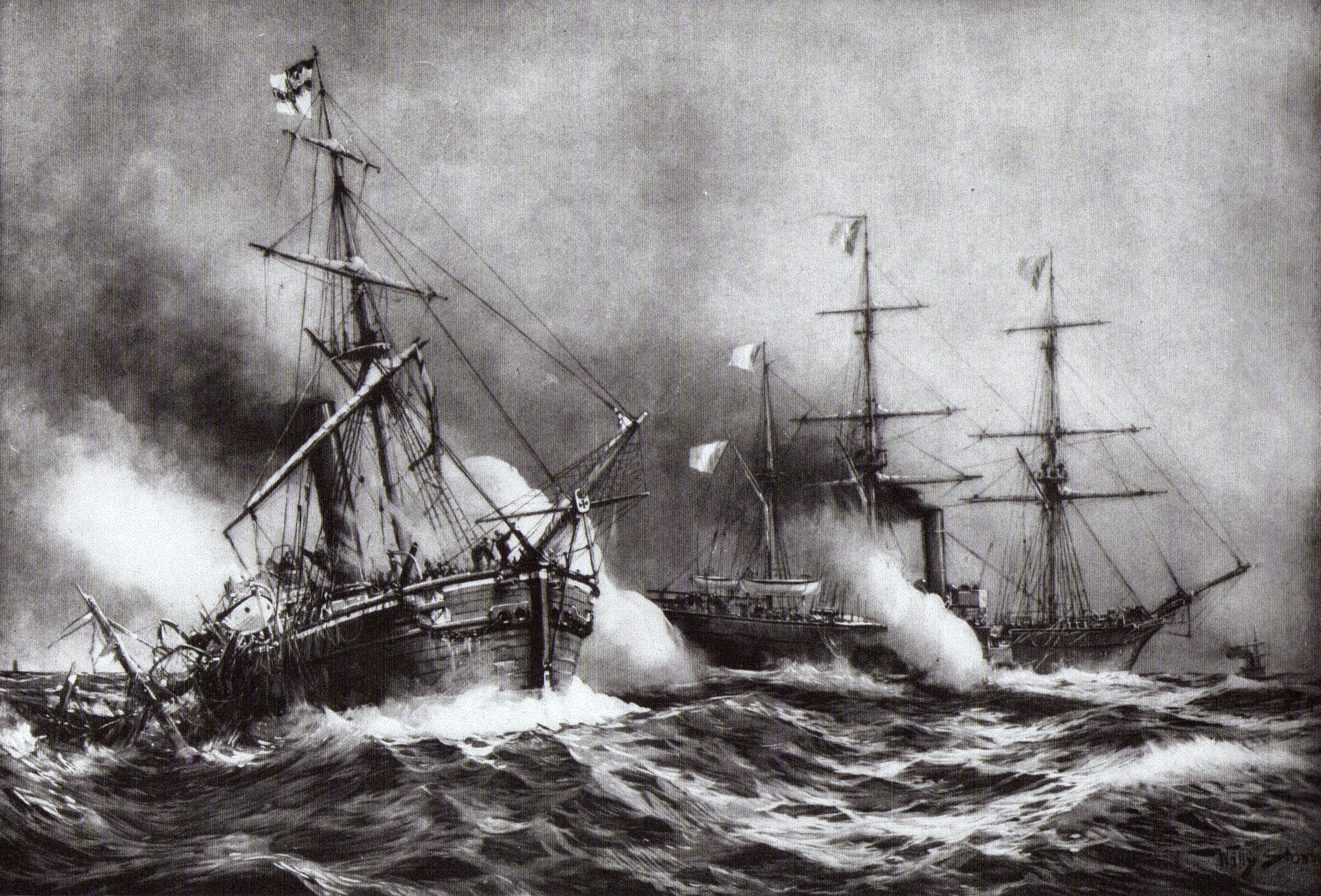
Single-ship action between the German gunboat Meteor and the French aviso Bouvet at the Battle of Havana.

- 1870, November 7 – French aviso Bouvet fights German gunboat Meteor off Havana. (details)

=== Russo-Turkish War of 1877–1878 ===
- 1877, July 23 – Ottoman central battery ironclad Feth-i Bülend duels inconclusively with Russian auxiliary cruiser Vesta in the Black Sea.

=== War of the Pacific ===
- 1879, May 21 – Peruvian ironclad Huáscar sinks Chilean corvette Esmeralda. (details)
- 1879, May 21 – Chilean schooner Virgen de Covadonga, in the midst of the struggle, caused the Peruvian ironclad Independencia to run aground. (details)
- 1879, July 10 – Inconclusive engagement in Iquique between the Chilean corvette Magallanes and the Peruvian ironclad Huáscar.
- 1880, April 4 – Inconclusive engagement in Tocopilla between the small Chilean steamer Taltal and the armed Peruvian transport Oroya.

=== Spanish–American War ===
- 1898, April 25 – Spanish gunboat Ligera repulses an attack by American torpedo boat USS Foote (details)

=== Venezuelan Civil War ===
- 1902, February 7 – Rebel auxiliary cruiser Libertador sinks Venezuelan gunboat General Crespo.

=== Mexican Revolution ===
- 1914, March 31 – Huertistas gunboat Guerrero sinks Constitutionalist gunboat Tampico at the Third Battle of Topolobampo
- 1914, June 16 – Huertistas gunboat Guerrero sinks Constitutionalist gunboat Tampico at the Fourth Battle of Topolobampo

=== World War I ===
- 1914, August 4 - British light cruiser HMS Bristol indecisively engages German light cruiser SMS Karlsruhe
- 1914, August 26 – British cruiser Highflyer defeats German auxiliary cruiser SS Kaiser Wilhelm der Grosse in the Battle of Río de Oro
- 1914, September 9 – British gunboat HMS Dwarf engages German armed yacht Herzogin Elisabeth in an action in the Wouri River
- 1914, September 14 – British armed merchantman HMS Carmania sinks German auxiliary cruiser SMS Cap Trafalgar in an engagement off Trindade Island in the South Atlantic
- 1914, September 16 – British gunboat HMS Dwarf sinks German customs cutter Nachtigal in an action in the Wouri River
- 1914, September 20 – In the Battle of Zanzibar, the German cruiser SMS Königsberg attacks and sinks the British cruiser HMS Pegasus while it is in harbour for repairs.
- 1914, November 9 – Australian light cruiser HMAS Sydney defeats German light cruiser SMS Emden in the Battle of Cocos.
- 1915, June 2 – British gunboat HMS Odin damages Ottoman gunboat Marmaris which beaches itself off Amarah in the Tigris River.
- 1915, August 8 – German auxiliary cruiser SMS Meteor sinks British Armed Boarding Steamer Ramsey off Fair Isle
- 1917, February 26 – British gunboat HMS Mantis damages Ottoman gunboat Doğan which runs aground near Al Aziziyah.
- 1917, March 10 – German auxiliary cruiser SMS Möwe sinks New Zealand freighter Otaki but is seriously damaged

=== Russian Civil War ===
- 1920, May 3 – Soviet floating battery Krasnaya Zarya engages French sloop Le Scarpe off Ochakov, damaging her and forcing her surrender.

=== World War II ===
- 1940, July 13 – German auxiliary cruiser Atlantis sinks British liner Kemmendine after a short action in the Indian Ocean.
- 1940, July 28 – German auxiliary cruiser Thor indecisively engages the British armed merchant cruiser RMS Alcantara.
- 1940, November 5 – German heavy cruiser Admiral Scheer sinks convoy escort armed merchant cruiser HMS Jervis Bay in the North Atlantic.
- 1940, November 9 – The Free French aviso Savorgnan de Brazza sinks her sister ship, Vichy French aviso Bougainville, off Libreville.
- 1940, December 5 – German auxiliary cruiser Thor damages British auxiliary cruiser HMS Carnarvon Castle.
- 1941, February 27 – HMNZS Leander sinks Italian auxiliary cruiser Ramb I in the Action of 27 February 1941, a brief engagement off the Maldives.
- 1941, April 4 – German auxiliary cruiser Thor sinks the British armed merchant cruiser HMS Voltaire in the Action of 4 April 1941 1,200 km (650 nmi; 750 mi) off the Cape Verde islands.
- 1941, May 8 – The British heavy cruiser HMS Cornwall sinks German auxiliary cruiser Pinguin in the Action of 8 May 1941 off the Seychelles.
- 1941, November 19 – The German auxiliary cruiser Kormoran and Australian light cruiser HMAS Sydney sink each other near Western Australia.
- 1942, April 1 – German auxiliary cruiser Thor sinks British freighter Willesden after a brief action.
- 1942, June 6 – German auxiliary cruiser Stier sinks the tanker SS Stanvac Calcutta in the Action of 6 June 1942 in the South Atlantic.
- 1942, July 20 – German auxiliary cruiser Thor sinks British reefer Indus in a brief action.
- 1942, September 27 – German auxiliary cruiser Stier and American Liberty ship SS Stephen Hopkins sink each other in the South Atlantic.

=== Ecuadorian–Peruvian War ===
- 1941, July 25 – Ecuadorian gunboat Abdón Calderón duels inconclusively with Peruvian destroyer Almirante Villar off Jambeli

=== Korean War ===
- 1950, June 25 – ROKS Pak Tu San sinks a North Korean troop transport in Battle of Korea Strait.
- 1950, September 10 – ROKS PC-703 sinks a North Korean minelayer.

=== Vietnam War ===
- 1968, March 1 – USCGC Winona sinks North Vietnamese naval trawler T-A

=== Sri Lankan Civil War ===
- 2003, March 10 – SLNS Sayura sinks LTTE logistic vessel MV Koimer off Mullaitivu

=== Anti-piracy off Somalia ===
- 18 November 2008 – INS Taber sinks the trawler Ekawat Nava 5, which Somali pirates had captured.
- 29 March 2009 – German naval tanker Spessart engages and repulses a Somali pirate skiff.
- 10 April 2010 – USS Ashland sinks a Somali pirate skiff in a brief action.
- 28 January 2011 – INS Cankarso sinks Somali pirate trawler Prantalay 14 off Minicoy Island. (details)
- 22 March 2011 – HMAS Stuart destroys a Somali pirate skiff being towed by the pirated MV Sinar Kudus.
- 26 March 2011 – Indian off-shore patrol vessel INS Suvarna captures pirated trawler MV Mortaza
- 12 May 2011 – USS Stephen W. Groves sinks Somali pirate longliner Jih Chun Tsai 68 in the Indian Ocean off Somalia.
- 12 May 2011 – HDMS Esbern Snare sinks Somali pirate dhow FV NN Iran
- 22 November 2011 – Italian destroyer Andrea Doria duels inconclusively with a Somali pirate skiff.
- 12 January 2012 – Patiño captures a Somali pirate skiff

=== Anti-piracy in the Gulf of Guinea ===
- 28 August 2012 – Pirated tanker Energy Centurian fights off a Togolese navy patrol vessel and escapes.
- 19 February 2016 – Nigerian frigate NNS Okpabana captures the pirated tanker Elvis-3 in the Gulf of Guinea in a contested boarding action.

=== Second Libyan Civil War ===
- 6 April 2017 – A Libyan Coast Guard vessel captures a migrant smuggling vessel after an action off Zawiya.

=== Anti-piracy off Venezuela ===
- 30 March 2020 – Cruise-liner RCGS Resolute inadvertently sinks Venezuelan Patrol Boat Naiguatá after being attacked by Naiguatá in international waters.

== See also ==
- Bibliography of early U.S. naval history
- List of naval battles
- List of submarine actions
