= Union Island (ship) =

Several vessels have been named Union Island after Union Island in Saint Vincent and the Grenadines.

All three vessels below had the same owner.

- Union Island was launched at Bristol in 1773 as Sarah. She was Union Island by 1776. Her captain acquired a letter of marque in 1778, and again in 1779. In late 1779 she was sailing from St Augustine to Honduras when a French privateer captured her and took her into Cap François.
- Union Island (1783 ship), of 265 tons (bm), was a merchant vessel launched at Bristol in 1783 as a West Indiaman. Richard Tombs repaired and lengthened her in 1792. She was advertised for sale in 1793. The advertisement gave her burthen as 335 tons, her length as 104 ft 6 in (31.9 m), her beam as 27 ft 3 in (8.3 m), and the depth of her hold as 11 ft 2 in (3.4 m).
- Union Island (1794 ship) was a merchant vessel launched at Bristol in 1794. She had the same master and owner as Union Island (1783 ship). In 1801, she participated in two single-ship actions. In the first, she repelled an attack by a Spanish privateer. In a later attack that year a French privateer captured her. She returned to English ownership in 1802. She then sailed as a West Indiaman until about 1818 when she started sailing between Liverpool and Africa. She was wrecked on 27 June 1821 on the coast of Africa.
