= Capture of HMS Dominica =

- Part of the War of 1812
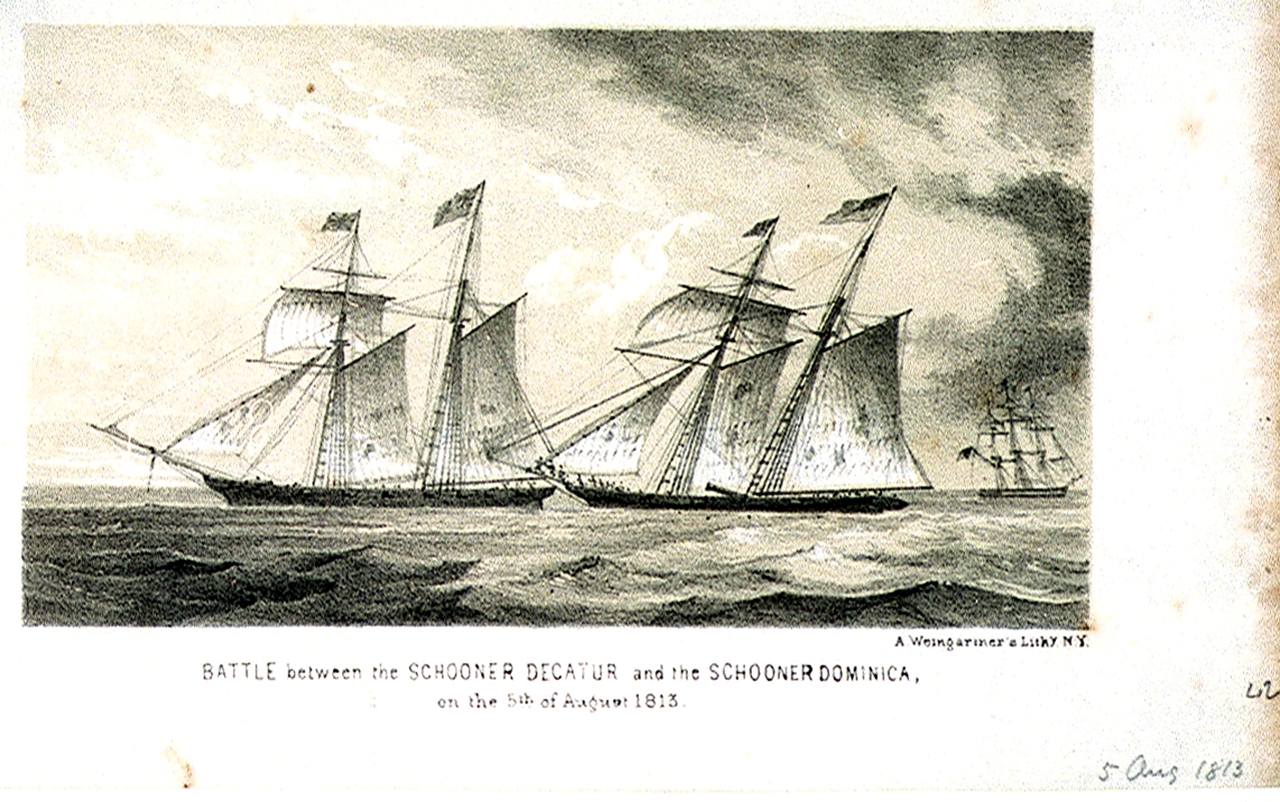
- Decatur & HMS Dominica, 1812
Date	5 August 1813
Location	off Bermuda, Atlantic Ocean
Result	United States victory

Belligerents
United States	United Kingdom

Commanders and leaders
Dominique Diron	(United Kingdom) George Wilmot Barette †

Strength
Schooner Decatur	Schooner Dominica

Casualties and losses
5 killed 15 wounded Decatur damaged	18 killed 70 captured (inc. 42 wounded Dominica captured
- Dominica was escorting a merchant ship at the beginning of the battle.

The capture of HMS Dominica was a notable single-ship action that occurred on 5 August 1813 off the Bermudas during the War of 1812. American privateer Decatur and the Royal Navy schooner Dominica engaged in a fierce contest that ended with the capture of Dominica after a long battle.

== Background ==
HMS Dominica was a schooner under the command of the young Lieutenant George Wilmot Barette. She had a crew of 88 men and was armed with twelve 12-pounder guns, two long 6-pounders, one brass 4-pounder and one 32-pounder. The British vessel was escorting the packet ship Princess Charlotte.

At about 10:30 am on 5 August 1813 the schooner Decatur appeared on the horizon. Captain Dominique Diron commanded the privateer, which was armed with one 18-pounder Long Tom and six 12-pounder guns. She had a complement of 103 officers and crew.

Diron approached cautiously but none of the vessels were flying colours. For over an hour the three vessels sailed side by side almost at gunshot distance as Diron attempted to ascertain the identity of the other vessels and to position his ship off Dominica's starboard bow. At 12:30 pm the Americans learned that their prey was a schooner-of-war when Lieutenant Barette raised the British flag and attempted to flee with the merchantman.

== Capture ==
At about 1:30 pm Dominica fired when it maneuvered in for an attack, but the shot fell short. Although Dominica was more heavily armed than Decatur, Diron chose to engage her. The Americans then raised their colors and beat to quarters. To ensure that none of his men fled below, Captain Diron ordered all the hatches closed after all the ammunition, water and grappling hooks were brought on deck. Diron planned to get as close as possible to Dominica without firing a shot so as to release a broadside and a discharge of musketry before boarding under cover of the smoke. It was around 2:00 pm when Decatur maneuvered for this but the Americans were answered with a broadside and a deadly duel ensued. The two schooners exchanged fire while the merchantman continued her escape.

The combatants fought at such a short distance from each other that Diron could hear Barette shouting to his men, telling them to take better aim and to fire into Decatur's hull. Their next salvos smashed two shot-holes through Decatur's hull, killing two men and also damaging the ship's sails and rigging. This, the most damaging British broadside of the battle, stopped an attempt at boarding and temporarily disabled Decatur, whose crew had to quickly repair the rigging. After repairs the Americans responded with fire from the Long Tom and began scoring more hits on Dominica. Many of the cannonballs landed on deck so the British tried to flee but Decatur was a fast ship and remained in Dominica's wake.

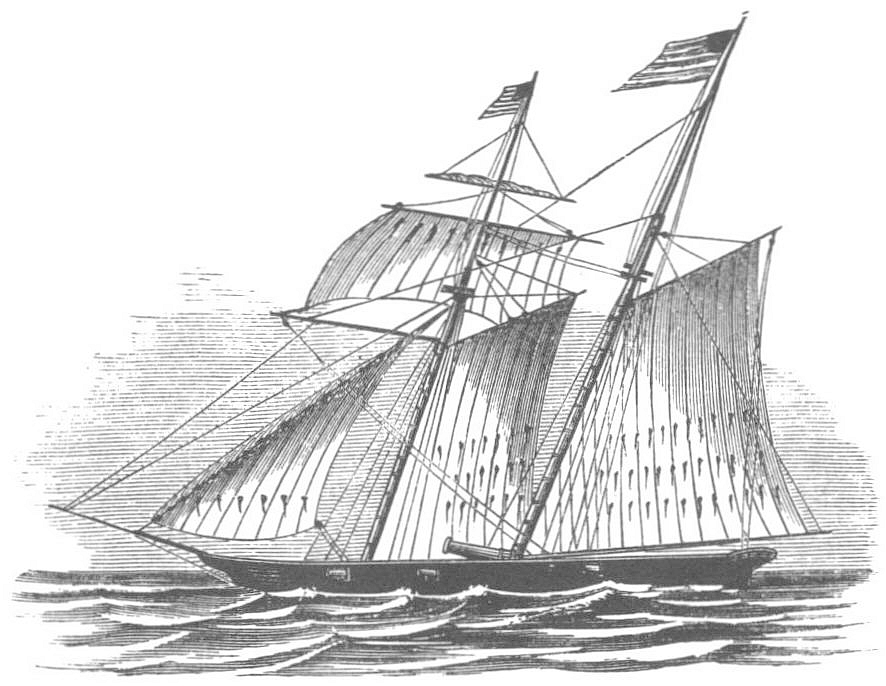
A seven gun American privateer schooner during the War of 1812.

The battle was a chase at this point, neither side could accurately fire on each other and when Diron moved in for a second attempt at boarding, he was repulsed in the same manner as the first. Barrete's last maneuver prevented the Americans from boarding but he ultimately steered his ship out of the wind so Decatur was able to overhaul Dominica and carry out a third attempt at boarding. It was about 3:30 pm when Captain Diron ordered his boarders to prepare for going over the side. At the last moment, Diron moved his ship so that the bow sprit of Decatur was heading directly for Dominica's stern. The two ships collided and Diron's jib boom pieced Barette's mainsail. The Americans were then able to board and gain control of Dominica's deck, forcing her colors down and ending the fight.

== Aftermath ==
The Americans had five dead and fifteen wounded. Lieutenant Barette was mortally wounded but continued fighting with sword in hand until he died. In all, thirteen Royal Navy sailors were killed in action, forty-seven others were wounded, five mortally. Dominica and Decatur were both heavily damaged but Decatur managed to bring Dominica into Charleston, South Carolina a few days later. Captain Diron was made a hero for being one of the few privateer commanders to make a prize out of a Royal Navy warship during the war. Diron was already well known before the battle and Dominica's demise added to his notoriety. Barette was also reported by the Americans as having defended his ship until death in a most gallant fashion and when the survivors were released after the war, they said that they were treated well by Diron and his crewmen. The British never surrendered in the battle and were defeated by force alone.

== Post script ==
On 22 May 1814, HMS Majestic recaptured Dominica.

On 5 June 1814 HMS Rhin sighted and gave chase to an American privateer schooner. After an eleven-hour chase Rhin captured Decatur in the Mona Passage about four leagues from Cape Engaño. Dominique Diron had sailed Decatur from Charleston on 30 March but had made no captures.
