= Royal Bounty (1811 ship) =

History

United Kingdom
- Name: Royal Bounty
- Acquired: 1811
- Captured: 1 August 1812 and burnt

General characteristics
- Tons burthen: 337, or 338 (bm)
- Complement: 18 men
- Armament: 10 guns (probably 6-pounders)

Royal Bounty first appeared in Lloyd's Register (LR) in the Register of Shipping (RS) in 1811. A United States privateer captured and burnt her in 1812 after a notable single ship action.

== Career ==
Both gave her origin as "Foreign", with the RS also describing her as "old". An advertisement noted that Royal Bounty, of 338 tons (bm), would be offered for sale on 8 February 1811 at the Leith Coffeeroom. It noted that she had just undergone a thorough repair and was ready for sea.

Year	Master	Owner	Trade	Source & notes
1811	H.Gamble	Campbell	Leith–America	LR; good repair 1810
1811	Gambles	Robertson	Leith–St Andero; Hull–Quebec	LR; repairs 1811
1812	Gambles	Robertson	Leith–St Andero; Hull–Quebec	LR; repairs 1811 & good repair 1812

== Fate ==
Royal Bounty, Captain Henry Gamble, sailed from Hull on 8 June 1812, bound for Prince Edward Island. She had a crew of 18 men and also carried four passengers, one a woman. (Note: American records described Royal Bounty as a ship of 658 tons (bm), 10 guns, and 25 men.) The United States privateer Yankee, Captain Oliver Wilson, captured Royal Bounty off Saint Pierre and Miquelon on 1 August. The 1813 volume of RS carried the annotation "captured" under her name.

Captain Gamble was unaware that war between the United States and Great Britain had broken out. A vessel flying the Union Jack pursued him, then raised American colours, and fired on him. Gamble and his crew returned fire. Royal Bounty struck after an engagement of an hour and a half. The boy manning the helm had been killed, and Gamble, his second mate, and two other crew wounded. The chief mate was also wounded by some shots after Royal Bounty had struck. American casualties consisted of two men wounded. (Note: The American account stated that Yankee had three men wounded.) The American vessel was the privateer Yankee, of Bristol, Rhode Island, of 18 guns, and a crew of 120 men under Captain Wilson. (Note: Other accounts describe Yankee as a brigantine of 168 tons, 15 guns, and 115 men. She captured 54 prizes during the war, of which 18 reached the United States.) The Americans took all aboard Royal Bounty onto Yankee, where they treated the wounded. The Americans dealt roughly with the rest of the crew.

In his detailed account of the action, Captain Wilson reported that the action had lasted about an hour, and that the British had lost two men killed and seven wounded, including Captain Gambles. Royal Bounty's helmsman was killed early in the engagement. Wilson also described Royal Bounty as having a burthen of 658 tons.

A little later Yankee captured Thetis, of Poole, Pack, master, whose crew abandoned her and escaped. Thetis was carrying coals for Sydney. Yankee set fire to Thetis, and apparently Royal Bounty as well. Royal Bounty had been sailing in ballast and so had no valuable cargo. The Americans put Gamble and his men aboard a boat, in which they were able to reach Placentia safely.

As noted earlier, some American reports of the action doubled Royal Bounty's burthen, and gave her armament as sixteen 6-pounder guns.
