= Backhouse (1785 ship) =

British merchant and slave ship (1785–1813)

History

Great Britain
- Name: Backhouse
- Namesake: Daniel Backhouse (Note: Daniel Backhouse was a partner in the ownership of the vessel with John and Thomas Tarleton.)
- Owner: 1792:Tarleton & Backhouse; 1797:Tarleton & Rigg
- Builder: Chester
- Launched: 1785
- Fate: Last listed 1813

General characteristics
- Tons burthen: 174, or 177, or 180, or 190, or 195, or 215 (bm)
- Length: 79 ft 6 in (24.2 m)
- Beam: 22 ft 11 in (7.0 m)
- Sail plan: Brig
- Complement: 1794:20; 1795: 20; 1796: 15
- Armament: 1794: 10 × 6-pounder guns; 1795: 12 × 6-pounder guns; 1796: 12 × 6-pounder guns; 1804: 8 × 4-pounder guns; 1809: 2 × 4-pounder guns
- Notes: Two decks & two masts

Backhouse was launched in 1785 at Chester. She initially sailed as a West Indiaman. In 1792–1793 she made one voyage as a slave ship in the triangular trade in enslaved people. Once in 1796 and twice in 1797 she repelled attacks by French privateers in three single-ship actions. Backhouse made four more voyages transporting enslaved people and then returned to the West Indies trade. After about 1809 she became a London coaster and was last listed in 1813.

== Career ==
Backhouse first appeared in Lloyd's Register in 1787. On 20 December 1786, Backhouse, Collinson, master, sailed from Liverpool for Grenada.

| Year | Master | Owner | Trade | Source |
|---|---|---|---|---|
| 1787 | J.Collinson | Tarleton | Liverpool–Dominica | LR |
| 1790 | J.Collinson | Tarleton | Liverpool–New York | LR |
| 1791 | J.Collinson | Tarleton | Liverpool–Genada | LR |
| 1792 | J.Collinson; J.Harrocks | Tarleton | Liverpool–Grenada | LR |

1st voyage transporting enslaved people (1792–1793): Captain James Harrocks sailed from Liverpool on 27 October 1792 bound for West Africa. Backhouse started acquiring captives at Bonny on 12 January 1793. She departed from Africa on 6 May with 296 captives. She was at Grenada and then arrived at Montego Bay, Jamaica on 5 July with 281 captives. Harrocks died on 19 July. The mention in Lloyd's List on Backhouse's arrival at Jamaica referred to "late Harrocks". Captain Michael Pele replaced Harrocks. Backhouse sailed for home on 11 October and arrived at Liverpool on 21 December. She had left Liverpool with 33 crew members and lost 17 on her voyage.

| Year | Master | Owner | Trade | Source |
|---|---|---|---|---|
| 1794 | Harrocks; M.Pill | Tarleton | Liverpool–Grenada | LR |
| 1796 | M.Pill; J.Flanagan | Tarleton | London–St Vincent; Liverpool–Africa | LR |

In 1794 and 1795 two captains received letters of marque, John Marr on 28 March 1794 and James Thomson on 9 December 1795. There is a record in Lloyd's List's ship arrival and departure data of Captain Marr sailing to Dominica, but no mention of Captain Thomson.

On 8 October 1796, as Captain James Flanagan was sailing Backhouse from Liverpool to Martinique, a French brig privateer of 16 guns shadowed them from 8am to 9pm, before engaging them. After firing some shots the French vessel stood off, but continued the chase through the night. Next morning the French vessel renewed the engagement. Backhouse was down to her last two cartridges when the privateer sheared off; Flanagan immediately set off in pursuit, till the privateer escaped. Flanagan resumed his voyage. The privateer came up the next day again, but when Flanagan demonstrated his intention to engage, sheared off, with Backhouse in pursuit for a time. The engagement took place at 28°30′N 24°00′W.

In July 1797 as Backhouse was sailing from Saint Vincent back to Liverpool, a French privateer schooner of sixteen 6-pounder guns came up. Captain Flanagan had a crew of only 15 men, including himself, but with the assistance of three gentleman passengers, was able to exchange fire for two-and-a-half hours before the French vessel withdrew. There were no British casualties. In the engagement Backhouse had expended all her ammunition.

| Year | Master | Owner | Trade | Source & notes |
|---|---|---|---|---|
| 1797 | Flanagan; J.Hunter | Tarleton; W.Rigg | Liverpool–Martinique; Liverpool–Africa | LR; repairs 1795 |

In 1797 Backhouse returned to transporting enslaved people.

2nd voyage transporting enslaved people (1797–1798): Captain James Hunter sailed from Liverpool on 26 September 1797.

In 1797, 104 vessels left English ports on enslaving voyages. Ninety of these vessels sailed from Liverpool.

In October, while she was on her way to Africa, Backhouse, Hunter, master, encountered a French privateer armed with sixteen 12-pounder guns. After a three-hour engagement, the privateer, left.

Backhouse acquired captives at Bonny and arrived at Kingston, Jamaica in April 1798 with 303 captives. She brought with her a Spanish prize.

| Year | Master | Owner | Trade | Source & notes |
|---|---|---|---|---|
| 1800 | J.Hunter; A.Harding | W.Rigg | Liverpool–Africa; London–Africa | LR; repairs 1795 |

3rd voyage transporting enslaved people (1800–1801): Captain A. Harding sailed from London on 13 April 1800.

In 1800, 133 vessels sailed from English ports on enslaving voyages. Of these vessels, 120 sailed from Liverpool.

Backhouse acquired captives on the Gold Coast and arrived at Demerara on 30 May 1801 with 200 captives. On 5 September 1801 she had parted from the homeward-bound convoy from Tortola to London in a very heavy gale, and then had to put into Lisbon for repairs. The crew had had to cut away her mizzen mast and throw overboard five hogsheads of sugar to right Backhouse. She also lost her anchors and eight guns. Backhouse arrived back in London on 31 December 1801.

| Year | Master | Owner | Trade | Source & notes |
|---|---|---|---|---|
| 1802 | A.Harding; Jenkins | Mills | London–Africa | LR; repairs 1795 & good repair 1800 |

4th voyage transporting enslaved people (1802–1803): Captain M.Jenkins sailed from London on 5 March 1802.

In 1802, 155 vessels sailed from English ports on voyages to transport enslaved people. Of these vessels, 122 sailed from Liverpool and 32 sailed from London.

Backhouse started acquiring captives on the Gold Coast on 11 May. She arrived at St Vincent on 29 December with 198 captives. At some point Captain Lawson replaced Jenkins as she had arrived at St Vincent as Backhoue, "late Jenkins". Backhouse, Lawson, master, arrived back in London on 3 April 1803.

| Year | Master | Owner | Trade | Source & notes |
|---|---|---|---|---|
| 1802 | Jenkins; J.Smith | Mills | London–Africa | LR; repairs 1795 & good repair 1800 |

On 4 November 1803 Backhouse, Smith, master, left Gravesend for Africa. On 13 December she and a number of other Africa-bound vessels were reported "all well" at 48°N 9°W after a heavy gale had dispersed the fleet. On 13 August 1804 she was back at Gravesend, from Africa. Absent original research it is not clear whether this was a simple trading voyage or an aborted slave-trading voyage.

| Year | Master | Owner | Trade | Source & notes |
|---|---|---|---|---|
| 1804 | Jenkins; A.Ramsey | Mills | London–Africa | LR; repairs 1795 & good repair 1800 |

5th voyage transporting enslaved people (1804–1805): Captain Thomas Ramsay sailed from London on 29 October 1804.

In 1804, 147 vessels sailed from English ports on enslaving voyages. Of these vessels, 18 sailed from London and 126 sailed from Liverpool.

By 16 December, Backhouse was at Madeira. She arrived at St Lucia on 16 July 1805 with 153 captives. She sold there. She arrived back at London on 12 December 1805.

| Year | Master | Owner | Trade | Source & notes |
|---|---|---|---|---|
| 1807 | A.Ramsey | Cox & Co. | London–Tobago | LR; good repair 1800 & small repairs 1805 |
| 1809 | C.Hogg | W.Pannett | London coaster | Register of Shipping (RS); thorough repair 1800 & damages repaired 1801 |

== Fate ==
Backhouse was last listed in 1813 with data unchanged from 1809.
