= Lascelles (1807 ship) =

UK merchant vessel (1807–1822)

History

United Kingdom
- Name: Lascelles
- Launched: 1807
- Fate: Wrecked 1822

General characteristics
- Tons burthen: 205 (bm)
- Complement: 13 or 16 (at loss)
- Armament: 1809:10 × 6-pounder guns; 1814:4 × 4-pounder guns + 6 × 9-pounder carronades

Lascelles was launched at Hull. She was a general trader, sailing to the Baltic, the Mediterranean, and the Americas. In 1809 she successfully repelled a larger privateer in a single-ship action. She wrecked in 1822.

== Career ==
She appeared in Lloyd's Register for 1808 with R. Nicholson, master, Lampl_gh, owner, and trade Hull–Baltic.

Lloyd's Register for 1810 showed Lascelles with J. Spence, master, "Lampl'gh", master, and trade Liverpool−Malta.

Lloyd's List reported on 20 October 1809 that Lascelles had arrived at Palermo after an engagement with a French privateer. Lascelles had one man killed and her master and five more men wounded. The engagement occurred on 7 August off the island of Galitor. It lasted for about an hour and a half before the privateer gave up and sailed away. The passengers helped man the guns. There were no fatalities on Lascelles, but Captain Spence and four men were injured, Spence and one man in particular being badly burned.

The Register of Shipping for 1815 showed Lascelles with Rotherford, master, Cookes & Co., owner, and trade London–Naples.

On 13 December 1817 Lascelles, Rutherford, master, came into Gibraltar. The day before, as she was sailing from London, a privateer from Buenos Aires fired on her and forced her to stop near Cape St Mary's.. The privateer was armed with 18 guns and had a crew of 150 men, not including officers. The privateer examined Lascelles's log book and cargo, and then permitted her to proceed.

The Register of Shipping for 1823 showed Lascelles, with Stonehouse, master, Dougall, owner, and trade Liverpool–Brazils. She had undergone small repairs in 1815 and 1821.

== Loss ==
On 15 November 1822 Lascelles, Stenhouse, master, was on her way into Liverpool from Maranham when a gale rising to a hurricane caught her and totally destroyed her near Southport. Her crew drowned; some 400–500 bags of cotton were saved. The wreck happened at night and in addition to her crew of 15, she had a Liverpool pilot on board.
