= Esther (1794 ship) =

History

France
- Launched: 1783
- Captured: c.1793

Great Britain
- Name: Esther
- Owner: 1794:T. Daniels; 1799:T. Allan & Co.; 1801:Caldcleaugh
- Acquired: 1794 by purchase of a prize
- Fate: Captured 1805

General characteristics
- Tons burthen: 340, or 358, or 364 (bm)
- Propulsion: Sails
- Sail plan: Brig
- Complement: 1794:37; 1800:30; 1803:40; 1804:40
- Armament: 6 × 12-pounder + 6 × 9-pounder guns + 2 × 9-poundr + 6 × 12-pounder guns "of the New Construction"; 1800:22 × 4&6&24-pounder guns; 1803:22 × 4&6&24-pounder guns + 2 swivel guns; 1804:22 × 18 & 6-pounder guns + 4 × 24-pounder carronades

Esther was launched in 1783 and entered British hands as a French prize of 1793. She took part in a notable single-ship action in 1794 in which she repelled a French privateer. Between 1801 and 1805 she made four slave trading voyages. A French privateer captured her in a sanguinary single-ship action in 1805.

== Career ==
Esther entered Lloyd's Register in 1794. Her owner was Daniels, her master was Devonish, and her trade Bristol to Barbados. On 20 February 1794 John Perrott Devonish received a letter of marque for Esther.

On 5 September 1794, Esther, Devonish, master, encountered Républicaine, which Devonish described as being armed with twenty 6-pounder guns and 18 swivel guns, and having a crew of 100-150 men. At 5p.m. a four-hour engagement commenced, that resumed the next morning, when after two-and-a-half hours Républicaine withdrew. Esther had one man fatally wounded, her mate, out of a crew of 18 men and three boys.

As Esther was returning from Barbados, she overset in the Avon River at Bristol and filled with water. Esther was refloated on 9 October and in November sailed again.

Although there was a report that the French had succeeded in capturing Esther in 1795 as she was sailing from Jamaica to London, that was a different Esther. (Note: Lloyd's List gives the date of capture as c. 26 September, and reports that Esther was one of several vessels that two French squadrons had captured. However, that was probably Esther, Gardner, master.)

In 1799 her master became T. Goodall and her owner T. Allan & Co. She also underwent repairs. In 1800 her master changed from T. Goodall to Stephen Bowers. Bowers received a letter of marque on 30 April 1800. In 1801 ownership of Esther changed to Caldcleugh.

1st slave voyage (1800–1802): Captain Bowers sailed from London on 22 May 1800. She acquired her slaves at Cape Mount and arrived at Kingston on 18 June 1801 with 291 slaves. She sailed from Kingston and arrived back at London on 21 February 1802. On this voyage James Main, and then "Abbot" apparently successively replaced Bowers.

Captain Duncan Stewart attempted to sail to Africa in 1802, but in early September 1802 he and Esther grounded on "The Flatts" and she had to return to Gravesend with damage. He then received a letter of marque for Esther on 2 September 1803.

2nd slave voyage (1802–1803): Captain Stewart sailed from London on 30 August 1802. Esther was reported on 29 October 1803 to be "all well" at 6°N 24°W. She acquired her slaves in the region of West Central Africa and St. Helena . She arrived in Demerara (now British Guiana). At some point Hamilton replaced Stewart as master. Esther returned to London on 19 June 1803.

3rd slave voyage (1803–1804): Captain Duncan Stewart sailed from London on 19 September 1803. Esther gathered her slaves at the Congo River and arrived at Charleston on 24 April 1804 with 367 slaves. She arrived back in London on 9 September 1804.

Captain George Irving received a letter of marque on 17 October 1804.

4th slave voyage (1804–1805): Captain Irving sailed from London on 2 November 1804. Esther acquired her slaves at the Congo River and then at Cabinda. She arrived at Charleston on 10 August 1805 with 370 slaves.

== Fate ==
On 13 December 1805, Lloyd's List reported that a privateer had captured Esther, Irvin, master, as she was leaving Charleston for England. "Irvin", his two mates, and eight to ten men had been killed, and several men were wounded.

She had left Charleston on 28 October under the command of Captain Wood, in company with the transport Minorca, Ariel, and a schooner, all under the escort of HMS Peterell. However, Minorca developed leaks and turned back, joined soon after by Esther, which too had developed leaks. They arrived at the Charleston bar on 3 November and took on board pilots, who informed them of the presence of the French privateer Creole.

The next day Creole attacked Esther. Creole, of Barracoa, was armed with six or seven guns of various calibers and had a crew of 111 men under the command of Captain Pierre Burgman. The two vessels exchanged fire for about an hour and then the privateers, taking advantage of the lack of wind, used their sweeps to come alongside. The fight continued for another 45 minutes, before the privateers could board. The fight then continued for another 20 minutes. Esther's officers and crew resisted until Irving was wounded and retired to his cabin, telling his third mate to strike. The privateers killed Irving in his cabin and proceeded to massacre a number of the other crewmen. A pilot boat from Charleston came out and took off the survivors. Two died on the boat, Mr. Ashton, the first mate, died on the wharf, and two more men died in the hospital. Two seamen at the hospital and 13 others were so terribly cut up that most were not expected to survive. Three of Esther's crew, a Venetian and two Portuguese, joined the privateer, though they had fought well during the action. Creole lost six killed, seven wounded, and had several men missing, believed to have been knocked overboard and drowned.

Esther had loaded a cargo of sugar but was apparently in a leaky state, making 16 inches of water an hour in her hold. There was some question as to whether she would make port. Minorca was reported to have put in to Charleston on 9 November in distress.

Creole and Esther arrived at St. Marys, Georgia, on 11 November.
