= Thetis (1801 ship) =

West Indiaman and slave ship

History

United Kingdom
- Name: Thetis
- Launched: 1801, Lancaster
- Fate: Wrecked 16 December 1815

General characteristics
- Tons burthen: 289, or 290, or 298 (bm)
- Complement: 1801:20; 1803:30
- Armament: 1801: 18 × 6-pounder guns; 1803: 18 × 6-pounder guns

Thetis was launched in 1801 at Lancaster as a West Indiaman. In 1804, in single ship action, she repelled an attack by a French privateer. Between 1806 and 1808 she made two complete voyages as a slave ship in the triangular trade in enslaved people. On the second, in early 1808 as Thetis was coming to Barbados from Africa, she again drove off a French privateer in a single ship action. With the end of the slave trade, Thetis returned to trading, first with the West Indies and then with Bahia. She was wrecked in December 1815 near Sunderland.

== Career ==
Thetis first appeared in Lloyd's Register (LR), in August 1801.

Year	Master	Owner	Trade	Source & notes
1801	J.Charnley	Houseman	Lancaster–Dominica	LR;

Captain John Charnley acquired a letter of marque on 17 July 1801.

After war with France resumed in 1803, Captain John Charnley acquired another letter of marque on 26 September 1803.

On 12 December 1803 Thetis, Charnley, master, sailed from Madeira for the West Indies. It was reported that the French privateer Egyptienne had captured her and taken her into the Canaries. The report was apparently in error as Thetis, Charnley, master, was subsequently reported to have arrived at Barbados from Cork and Madeira.

In late 1804 Thetis arrived at Barbados after having repelled the attack of a French privateer of 20 guns.

Year	Master	Owner	Trade	Source & notes
1806	J.Charnley; J.Christie	Houseman; Hind & Co.	Bristol–Dominica; Liverpool–Africa	LR;

1st enslaving voyage (1806–1807): Captain David Christie sailed from Liverpool on 8 May 1806. On 19 June she was reported "all well" off Cape Montserrado and in company with five other enslaving ships. She gathered her captives at Bonny, and sailed from there on 11 August. She sailed from São Tomé arrived at Dominica on 1 October. She arrived on 24 October at Kingston, Jamaica with 287 captives. She sailed from Kingston on 9 January 1807 and arrived back at Liverpool on 8 April. She had left Liverpool with 38 crew members and she suffered six crew deaths on her voyage.

2nd enslaving voyage (1807–1808): Captain Christie sailed from Liverpool on 1 June 1807. The Act for the abolition of the slave trade had passed Parliament in March 1807 and took effect on 1 May 1807. However, Thetis had apparently received clearance to sail before the deadline. Thus, when she sailed on 1 June, she did so legally. (Note: In his auto-biography, Hugh Crow claimed that his vessel, Kitty's Amelia was the last vessel to make a legal slave trading voyage from Britain when she sailed on 27 July. The claim has generally been accepted.) Thetis acquired her captives at Cabinda and arrived at Barbados on 19 February 1808 with 292 captives.

On her way to Barbados, Thetis fell in with the French privateer Revanche, of 14 guns and 180 men, at 12°N 52°W. Christie maneuvered his signals in such a way that Revanche, sailed off, believing that Thetis was a sloop of war, but not before Thetis had fired two damaging broadsides into her. Christie believed that Revanche had sailed to Cayenne.

Thetis arrived at Barbados before the arrival deadline of 30 March 1809. (Kitty's Amelia had arrived at Kingston, Jamaica on 25 January 1808. Crow reported that when he arrived there were 16 vessels already in the harbour. Their owners had rushed them into a last, legal journey, with the result that they had arrived in a poor state and under-provisioned. He also noted that there was glut of captives on the market and that some vessels had been waiting six months to land their captives, with captives dying while waiting.) Thetis left Barbados on 17 April, and arrived back at Liverpool on 27 May. She had left Liverpool with 37 crew members and she had suffered three crew deaths on her voyage.

Year	Master	Owner	Trade	Source
1808	D.Christie; J.Yuay	Hind & Co. Taylor	Liverpool–Africa	LR
1810	J.Young	Taylor	Liverpool–Africa	Register of Shipping; small repairs 1806 & 1808
1810	J.Yauy; T.Brasley	Taylor	Liverpool–Africa; Liverpool–Madeira	LR
1811	T.Brassey	Todd & Co.	Liverpool–Madeira	LR
1812	T.Brassey; Cowey	Todd & Co.	Liverpool–Madeira; London–West Indies	LR
1816	Cowey (or Cowie)	Captain & Co.	London–Bahia	LR

On the voyages to and from Brazil, Thetis on occasion stopped at Madeira, the Canaries, or Havana.

== Fate ==
Thetis, Cowie, master, was totally lost on 16 December 1815 near Sunderland. She was sailing from London to Shields.
