= Ranger (1789 ship) =

History

Great Britain
- Name: Ranger
- Launched: 1789, Liverpool
- Captured: 1795 and recaptured 1796

General characteristics
- Tons burthen: 110 (bm)
- Complement: 24
- Armament: 1793: 6 × 3-pounder guns; 1794: 10 × 4-pounder guns

Ranger was launched in Liverpool in 1789. She made four complete voyages as a slave ship in the triangular trade in enslaved people. A French privateer captured her in 1796 in a single ship action during her fifth voyage transporting enslaved people. She was recaptured, but thereafter disappears from online records.

== Career ==
Ranger first appeared in Lloyd's Register (LR) in 1789.

Year	Master	Owner	Trade	Source & notes
1789	J.Corran	W.Boats	Liverpool–Africa	LR

1st voyage transporting enslaved people (1789–1790): Captain John Corran sailed from Liverpool on 4 November 1789. Ranger started acquiring captives on 3 March 1790, first at Cape Coast Castle, and then at Anomabu. She sailed from Africa on 26 June and arrived at Kingston, Jamaica on 28 August 1790. She had embarked 180 captives and she arrived with 179. On 25 September she sailed from Jamaica and arrived back at Liverpool on 25 November. She had left with 25 crew members and suffered no crew deaths on her voyage.

The Slave Trade Act 1788 (Dolben's Act) was the first British legislation passed to regulate the shipping of enslaved people. One of the provisions of the act was bonuses for the master (£100) and surgeon (£50) if the mortality among the captives was under 2%; a mortality rate of under 3% resulted in a bonus of half that. Dolben's Act apparently resulted in some reduction in the numbers of captives carried per vessel, and possibly in mortality, though the evidence is ambiguous. (Note: At the time the monthly wage for a captain of a slave ship out of Bristol was £5 per month. That said, masters and surgeons received most of their income in the form of "coast commissions", based on the total number of captives they delivered, plus the income of the sale of two (or more) privilege captives.)

2nd voyage transporting enslaved people (1791): Captain John Corran sailed from Liverpool on 20 February 1791 and began acquiring captives on 6 May. She acquired captives at Bonny and left Africa on 24 June. She arrived at Kingston on 18 August. She had embarked 190 captives and arrived with 170, for an 11% mortality rate. She sailed from Kingston on 16 September and arrived back at Liverpool on 17 November. She had left Liverpool with 22 crew members and had suffered four crew deaths on her voyage.

3rd voyage transporting enslaved people (1792–1793): Captain Corran sailed from Liverpool on 16 April 1792. Ranger gathered captives at Whydah. She sailed from Africa on 29 September and arrived at St Vincent in November with 169 captives. She arrived back at Liverpool on 6 February 1793. At some point Captain Ladwick Carlile replaced Corran, but it is not clear when. (Note: Captain John Corran died on 24 July 1798, while captain of the enslaving ship Triton. It was his sixth voyage as a captain.) Ranger had left Liverpool with 19 crew members and she had suffered two crew deaths on her voyage.

4th voyage transporting enslaved people (1793–1794): By the time Ranger left on her fourth enslaving voyage, war with France had broken out. Captain John Gardner acquired a letter of marque 2 September. However, apparently it was Captain Caleb Gardner that sailed from Liverpool on 13 September. Ranger began acquiring captives on 30 November, somewhere in West Africa. She sailed from Africa on 11 March 1794 and arrived at Kingston on 24 May. She had embarked 183 captives and she had arrived with 181, for a 1% mortality rate. She sailed from Jamaica on 23 July and arrived back at Liverpool on 7 October.

Year	Master	Owner	Trade	Source & notes
1796	R.Wilson	H.E.Beats	Liverpool–Africa	LR; repairs 1794

5th voyage transporting enslaved people (1795–1796): Captain John Wilson sailed from Liverpool on 17 January 1795. In 1795, 79 British ships sailed on enslaving voyages, 59 from Liverpool.

Ranger was reported to have arrived at Angola. In February 1796, Lloyd's List reported that Ranger, Wilson, master, was the windward of Barbados, having come from Africa, when she encountered a privateer. After an action of two hours, the privateer captured Ranger.

Her captors took Ranger into Curacao, where Captain Wilson died soon after. Two of her crew had died in the action.

In 1795, 50 British vessels in the triangular trade were lost. This was the largest number for the period 1793–1807. Of the 50 vessels, seven were lost in the Middle Passage, i.e., while sailing from Africa to the West Indies. During the period 1793 to 1807, war, rather than maritime hazards or resistance by the captives, was the greatest cause of vessel losses among British enslaving vessels.

In May Lloyd's List reported that Ranger, Wilson, master, had been retaken and brought into Barbados.
