= Bedford (1803 ship) =

London slave ship

History

United Kingdom
- Launched: 1803, New Brunswick, or 1801, America
- Fate: Last listed 1814

General characteristics
- Tons burthen: 150, or 192, or 200 (bm)
- Complement: 1803:23; 1804:23; 1806:24
- Armament: 1803:4 × 4-pounder guns; 1804:14 × 4-pounder guns; 1806:14 × 4-pounder guns; 1809:2 × 4-pounder guns

Bedford arrived in 1803 at London. She then made three complete voyages as a slave ship until the Slave Trade Act 1807 ended British participation in the trans-Atlantic slave trade. During the first of these she repelled an attack by a privateer in a single ship action. From 1808 on she may have traded with Africa; she was last listed in 1814.

== Career ==
Bedford first appeared in Lloyd's Register (LR) in 1803.

Year	Master	Owner	Trade	Source
1803	Lane	Ramsden	London–Africa	LR

1st slave voyage (1803–1804): Captain William Beamish Lane (or Lain) sailed from London on 4 May 1803. By 19 June Bedford was at Cape Coast Castle. Captain Lane acquired a letter of marque on 29 September. Bedford gathered slaves at the Congo River and then sailed for the West Indies. She stopped at Barbados and then sailed for Demerara. While she was still to windward of Barbados, three privateers chased her. In an engagement that lasted half-an-hour she repelled one that carried eight guns, though she herself carried only four 5-pounder guns. From Demerara she arrived with 221 slaves at Kingston, Jamaica on 28 November 1804. She sailed from Kingston on 30 April and arrived back at London on 26 May.

2nd slave voyage (1804–1805): Captain Lane acquired a letter of marque on 21 August 1804. He sailed from London on 2 September. Bedford acquired her slaves in West Africa. She stopped at Surinam and arrived at Kingston on 6 May 1804 with 224 slaves. She arrived back in London on 6 December 1805. She may have suffered a slave insurrection either in Africa or during her voyage to the West Indies. On her return Lane reported that he had seen two French privateers capture Jack Park.

3rd slave voyage (1806–1808): Captain Gilbert Wenman acquired a letter of marque on 25 June 1806. He sailed from London on 7 July. Bedford began acquiring slaves at Cape Coast Castle on 4 December. She arrived at Jamaica on 30 April 1807 with 233 slaves. She sailed from 4 October and arrived back at London 6 January 1806.

Year	Master	Owner	Trade	Source & notes
1808	G.Winman; Demyss	Ramsden; Lumley	Liverpool–Africa	LR
1809	Demyss	Lamplogh	London–Cadiz	Register of Shipping (RS); large repair 1808
1814	Demyss	Lumley	Liverpool–Africa	LR damages repaired 1808

== Fate ==
Bedford was last listed in the Register of Shipping in 1810 and in Lloyd's Register in 1814. She had disappeared from Lloyd's List's ship arrival and departure data well before that.
