= Capture of the Veloz Passagera =

1830 single-ship action

Capture of Veloz Passagera
- Part of the Suppression of the Slave Trade
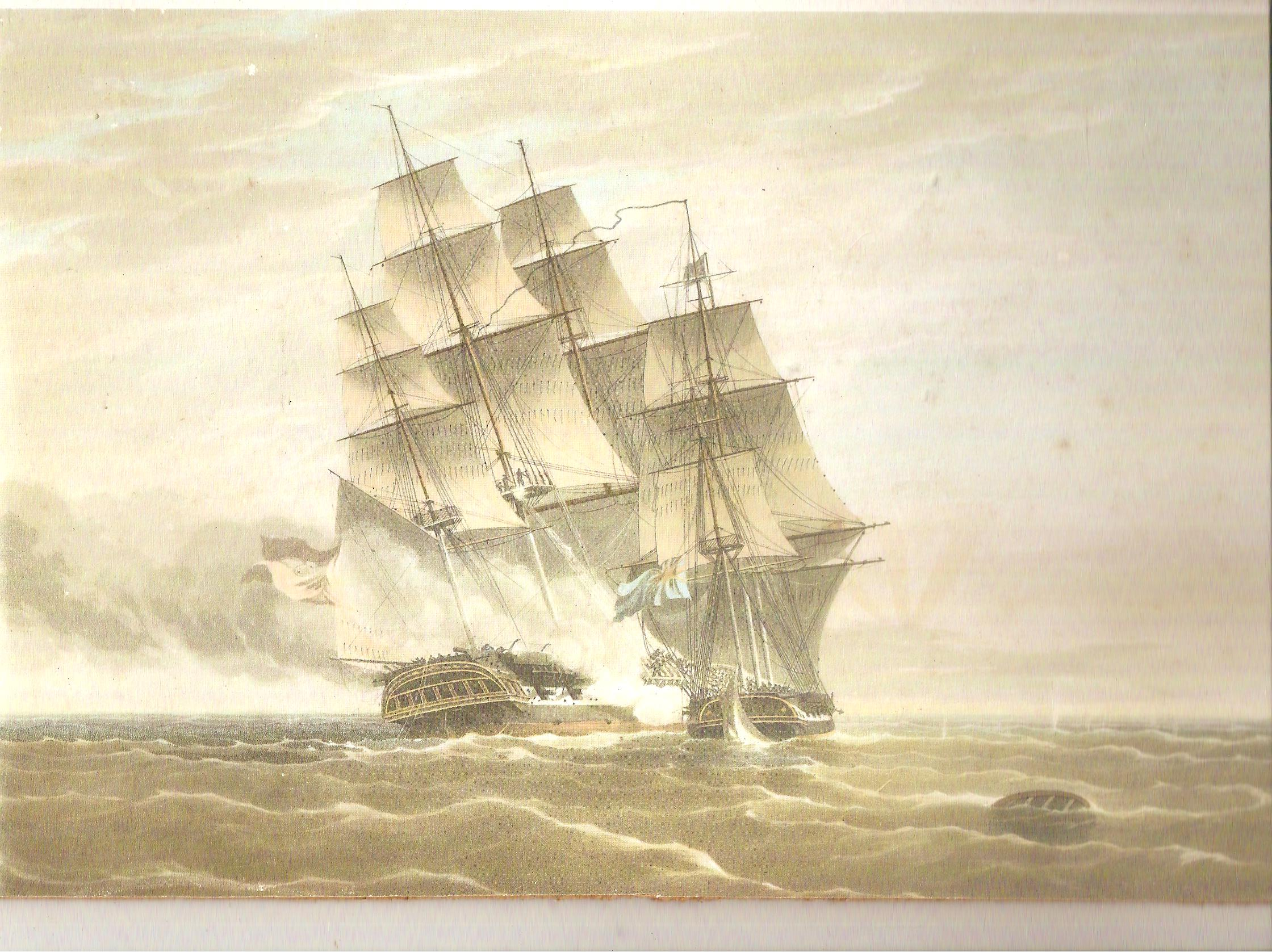
- HMS Primrose engaging Veloz Passagera.
Date	7 September 1830
Location	near Prince's Island, West Africa, Atlantic Ocean
Result	British victory

Belligerents
United Kingdom	Slave Trader

Commanders and leaders
(United Kingdom) William Broughton	Jozé Antonio de la Vega

Strength
1 sloop-of-war	1 ship

Casualties and losses
3 killed 12 wounded 1 sloop-of-war damaged	43 killed 20 wounded 1 ship captured

The Capture of Veloz Passagera was a single-ship action that occurred during the British Royal Navy's anti-slavery blockade of Africa in the early and mid 19th century. The sloop-of-war HMS Primrose, of 18 guns, under Captain William Broughton, captured the 20-gun Spanish slave ship Veloz Passagera, Jozé Antonio de la Vega, master.

== Capture ==
Veloz Passagera, of 408 tons (bm), Jayme Tinto, owner, sailed from Havana on 25 August 1828 with a crew of 100 men. She acquired her slaves at Jacquin and sailed on 7 September 1830.

Primrose encountered Veloz Passagera off Prince's Island, West Africa, in the evening of 6 September 1830. The British attacked early in the morning of 7 September. A severe single-ship action ensued in which the British ultimately boarded Veloz Passagera, capturing her. Forty-three slavers out of 150 were killed in action and another 20 were wounded; the British lost three killed and 12 wounded. The engagement was one of the few fought during several decades of anti-slavery operations off the African coast, and was the most significant in terms of casualties and the strength of the opposing forces.

Veloz Passagera had 556 slaves aboard her when Primrose opened fire. Five died as a result of the broadsides from Primrose, and another 21 died before the court condemned Velos Passagera and emancipated the slaves.

Primrose sent Veloz Passagera to Sierra Leone for adjudication by the Anglo-Spanish Court of Mixed Commission. She arrived on 9 October, and the Court condemned her on 16. The British wanted to try 24 of surviving crew in England with piracy. Captain Broughton sailed Primrose back to England as well, leaving Africa in December to follow up on the court proceedings. He took with him the 24 crew men. However, Lord Palmerston, the Foreign Secretary, decided that British courts had no jurisdiction and that charges of piracy were not appropriate. He had the 24 men transported to Spain, where they stood trial in 1831.

The proceeds of the bounty granted for 551 slaves and a moiety of the hull, etc., were deposited in the Registry of the High Court of Admiralty on 16 June 1831.
