= Sandown (1786 ship) =

History

Great Britain
- Name: Sandown
- Captured: 1794
- Fate: Wrecked 1794

General characteristics
- Tons burthen: 151, or 159 (by calc.) (bm)
- Length: 81 ft 9 in (24.9 m)
- Beam: 20 ft 9 in (6.3 m)

Sandown does not appear in Lloyd's Register. A Sandown does appear in Lloyd's Register between 1789 and 1798, but it is a different vessel from the Sandown of this article, though the two vessels are sometimes conflated.

In January 1786, Sandown, a foreign-built ship, had grounded at Sandown Bay on the back of the Isle of Wight. She had since been repaired.

The French privateer Guillotine captured Sandown, Apsey, master, on 28 July, at 23°40′N 83°58′W, about 100 miles WNW from Havana. The single ship action took about an hour before Sandown struck.

On 2 August, HMS Scorpion captured Guillotine, and recaptured Sandown; (Note: Guillotine was a privateer known to operate in the Caribbean in 1794. She had a crew of 110 men and carried 14 guns. French sources agree that her captor was HMS Scorpion.) Scorpion took them into Havana. Then on 27 and 28 August, Sandown, Apsey, master, was driven ashore at Havana in a hurricane and lost. At the time she was on her way from Jamaica and Havana to London. The hurricane destroyed over 76 vessels; only two were identified – Sandown, and the Spanish warship Flor. Most of the cargoes were salvaged.

It is clear from the log of Captain Gamble, master of Sandown (1788) that this Sandown is not Gamble's Sandown. In his account Gamble reports that on 15 August 1794, he had spoken with Mano, which reported that a British sloop-of-war had brought into Havana a privateer and her prize, which had been bound from Jamaica to Liverpool. Gamble further remarked that the merchantman had sailed from Jamaica some 14 days before the fleet that Sandown (1788) was part of had left. The prize money notice for the capture of Guillotine, and the salvage money notice for Sandown above support that the first account above in Lloyd's List is not a false report.
