= Badger (1775 ship) =

British slave ship and merchantman 1775–178

History

Great Britain
- Name: Badger
- Namesake: Badger
- Launched: 1775, Liverpool
- Renamed: 1778: Molly; 1800: Lydia
- Captured: 1782

General characteristics
- Tons burthen: 250, or 300 (bm)
- Complement: 1778:25; 1779: 20; 1779: 20
- Armament: 1778: 16 × 6-pounder guns; 1779: 16 × 6-pounder guns; 1779: 16 × 6-pounder guns + 10 swivel guns

Badger was launched in Liverpool in 1775. She made one voyage as a slave ship in the triangular trade in enslaved people. New owners renamed her Molly in 1778 and sailed her as a West Indian. In 1779 she repelled an American privateer in a sanguinary single ship action. Her owners renamed her Lydia. While trading with Tortola she captured one or two prizes. Lydia was herself captured in 1782.

== Career ==
Badger first appeared in an online copy of Lloyd's Register (LR) in the volume for 1776.

| Year | Master | Owner | Trade | Source & notes |
|---|---|---|---|---|
| 1776 | P.Potter | W.Davenport | Liverpool–Africa | LR |

Captain Peter Potter sailed from Liverpool on 9 September 1776. Badger acquired captives at the Cameroon River. She arrived at Dominica on 8 June 1777 with 386 captives. She sailed for Liverpool on 1 August, and arrived there on 4 October 1777.

| Year | Master | Owner | Trade | Source & notes |
|---|---|---|---|---|
| 1778 | P.Potter; T.Cragg | W.Davenport | Liverpool–Africa | LR; "Now the Molly" |

The British Admiralty had given notice in April 1777, that they were ready to issue letters of marque for privateers against the Americans. In March 1778, Great Britain broke off relations with France.

Captain Thomas Cragg, of Molly, acquired a letter of marque on 13 February 1778.

| Year | Master | Owner | Trade | Source |
|---|---|---|---|---|
| 1779 | T.Cragg; M.Seddon | J.Chorley | Liverpool–Tortola | LR |

Captain Mark Seddon acquired a letter of marque on 10 February 1779. On 2 August Molly, Seddon, master, sailed from Tortola in company with Prosperity, Mandeville, master, of Leverpool, a vessel bound for London, and a Scotch vessel, and two days later parted from them in a gale of wind.

On 7 September 1779, at 49°N 36°W, Molly encountered an American privateer of 22 guns on her main deck, plus other guns on her Fo'csle and quarterdeck. After an hour-long engagement, the privateer sailed off. Molly had five men killed, including Captain Seddon, and seven wounded. Molly arrived at Liverpool on 18 September.

| Year | Master | Owner | Trade | Source & notes |
|---|---|---|---|---|
| 1780 | W.Pall; Fell | J.Chorley | Liverpool–Tortola | LR; damages repaired 1779; "Now the Lydia Fall" |

Her owners renamed Molly to Lydia. Captain William Fell acquired a letter of marque on 26 November 1779.

Lloyd's List reported in January 1781 that as Lydia, Fell, master, was on her way from Leverpool to the Leeward Islands she ran ashore on the Burbo Bank in the Liverpool Bay. She was gotten off but she had sustained considerable damage and had to go back to Leverpool to discharge and refit.

In June Lloyd's List reported that Lydia, Fell, master, had taken a ship of 300 tons that had been sailing from Piscateague to Tenerife. The prize came into Londonderry. The captured vessel, Prosperity, and her cargo of lumber, came into Leverpool in July.

In October, Hannah, from Boston, arrived at Leverpool. She was a prize to Lydia.

== Fate ==
On 15 My 1782, Planter, Corbett, master, arrived at Leverpool from Tortola and reported that Lydia, Fell, master, had been captured.
