= Triton (1815 ship) =

1815 ship

History

United Kingdom
- Name: Triton
- Namesake: Triton
- Builder: Gilmore & Co., Sulkea
- Launched: 1815
- Fate: Sold 1815 or 1816

Spain
- Name: Triton
- Owner: Royal Philippine Company
- Acquired: 1816 by purchase
- Captured: 25 January 1817

General characteristics
- Tons burthen: 560 (bm)
- Propulsion: Sail
- Complement: 85
- Armament: 22 guns

Triton was launched at Calcutta in 1815 and sold shortly thereafter to Spanish owners. She was sailing from Bengal to Cadiz when an American-built and outfitted privateer with a letter of marque from the patriotic forces in Buenos Aires captured her in January 1817 in a sanguinary single-ship action during the Argentine War of Independence.

== Voyage and capture ==
After the Royal Philippine Company purchased Triton, Captain David Proudfoot took on a cargo and sailed from Bengal on 16 August 1816 with a cargo of piece goods, cassia bark, rice, and sugars. Triton was bound for Cadiz.

On 18 December Proudfoot detected a shoal at 0°32′S 17°46′W, which received the name "Triton's Bank". It extended about three miles east–west, and about one mile north–south. (Some other, later sources put Triton's Bank at 0°23′S 20°6′W.)

On 25 January 1817, Triton encountered the privateer Tupac Amaru off the Cape Verde islands. Tupac Amaru was armed with 12 guns and had a crew of 105 men under the command of Captain Menceno Monson. After an engagement of two-and-a-half (or four hours), Proudfoot struck. By one account, Triton had had 20 men killed.

Captain Proudfoot requested that Captain Monson land his prisoners, especially the wounded, at Madeira or the Canary Islands, but Monson refused, concerned that he might lose his prize. He sailed with his prisoners to Buenos Aires, where they finally arrived at Encenada on 1 April, and Proudfoot was permitted to go ashore on 12 April. Triton arrived at Buenos Aires the next day. During the long voyage, four of the wounded died, as did three other seamen, of scurvy.

Proudfoot presented petitions to the local authorities and the British consul pointing out that Tupac Amaru was the American brig Regent. She had been purchased at New York and had been sailed to Baltimore where she was fitted out and armed, and recruited a crew entirely made up of Americans. Monson's commission (letter of marque) had been forwarded from Buenos Aires. She had left Baltimore only 12 days before her encounter with Triton and had cleared Baltimore, ostensibly sailing for Havana. Proudfoot pointed out that he believed that it was "contrary to the law of nations" to outfit a privateer in a neutral port, man her with subjects of the neutral nation, and sail from that port to "cruize for captures."

The prize court at Buenos Aires on 17 April declared Triton a good prize to Tupac Amaru, Captain Marcena Monron. It ordered that Triton's cargo be delivered to Don David Cortes de Forest. Don David Cortes de Forest was an American, the former US Consul at Buenos Aires, and the owner of Tupac Amaru.

The Spanish Ambassador to the United States Luis de Onís y Gonzalez-Vara submitted on 2 November to the United States Secretary of State a protest and request for indemnification for the seizure of Triton by the American vessel Regent (aka Trepacamara). de Onís made essentially the same point that Proudfoot had made, and also pointed out that the US and Spain had signed a treaty in which the signatories had bound themselves not to permit third-party privateers to arm, equip, and operate from each other's ports. Spain claimed an indemnity of 701,980 dollars for the cargoes on Triton and another Royal Philippine Company, Esmerelda. Esmerelda too had been captured by an American privateer operating under the Buenos Aires flag.

== Post script ==
Tupac Amara (or Tupac Amaru) again sailed from Buenos Aires on 3 July 1817 on a privateering cruise. She was armed with 16 guns and carried a crew of 160 men. On 30 November a Spanish brig prize to Tupac Amaru arrived at Buenos Aires. The brig was the Santo Christo, which had been sailing from Lima to Cadiz. The national cruiser brig Tupac Amaru, Captain Juan Magfudole, had captured Santo Christo on 1 September off Santa Maria, Terceira Island. She had been carrying a cargo of cotton, copper, Jesuit's bark, and cacao. The cargo was transferred to Don David Cortes de Forest & Co. This is the last readily accessible mention of Tupac Amaru.
