= Lord Nelson (1800 ship) =

History

Spain
- Launched: 1792
- Captured: c.1800

United Kingdom
- Name: Lord Nelson
- Owner: 1802:William Hadkinson; 1805:William Hadkinson, Martin Hammill, & Thomas Rigby
- Launched: 1792
- Acquired: 1800 by purchase of a prize
- Captured: May 1806

General characteristics
- Tons burthen: 310, or 317, or 321 (bm)
- Complement: 1804:40; 1805:40
- Armament: 1804:18 × 6-pounder guns; 1805:18 × 6-pounder guns

Lord Nelson was launched in Spain in 1792 under another name. She came into British hands as a prize in 1800. She was initially a merchantman but then made two voyages as a slave ship carrying slaves from West Africa to the West Indies. In 1804 she had an inconclusive single-ship action with a French privateer. A French privateer finally captured her in May 1806 on her third slave trading voyage before she had disembarked her slaves.

== Career ==
Lord Nelson first appeared in the Register of Shipping only in 1802. Her master was Sanderson, changing to M'Kinnis, her owner was Hankinson, and her trade was Liverpool–Leghorn, changing to Liverpool–Africa.

Slave trading voyage #1 (1802-1803): Captain John Maginnis sailed from Liverpool on 3 September 1802, Bight of Biafra and Gulf of Guinea islands. The voyage began during the Peace of Amiens so he did not acquire a letter of marque. Lord Nelson gathered her captives at New Calabar and arrived at Havana on 16 May 1803. She had embarked 287 captives and she landed 258, for a loss rate of 33%. She left Havana on 27 July and arrived at Liverpool on 14 September. She had left Liverpool with 30 crew members and she suffered 10 crew deaths on the voyage.

Slave trading voyage #2 (1804-1805): Captain John Maginnis acquired a letter of marque on 17 January 1804. Lord Nelson sailed from Liverpool on 15 March 1804. She acquired her captives in Africa and arrived at St Thomas on 6 October 1810. She had embarked 352 captives and she landed 316, for a loss rate of 10.2%.

On 26 December 1804, Lord Nelson, Nymphe, Captain Heinsen, of 10 guns, and Harmony, Captain Reed, of 20 guns, sailed from St Thomas's together for mutual protection, bound for Liverpool. A few hours after they had left port they encountered a French privateer schooner of 10 guns (two of them 12-pounders), and 100 men, the entire crew from the captain on down being Black.

Maginnis, seeing the privateer attempting to catch Nymphe, stopped to give her time to catch up. However, the privateer captured Nymphe before she could reach Lord Nelson. Harmony took the opportunity to escape. Maginnis then set sail again, with the privateer in pursuit. The pursuit continued through the night and into the next day, with the privateer finally catching up at 3pm. An engagement ensued that lasted for an hour and a half with the privateer several times unsuccessfully trying to come up and board. Eventually the privateer sailed way, her sails and rigging much damaged and her bulwarks entirely gone.

Lord Nelson arrived at Liverpool on 5 February 1805. She had left with 39 crew members and she suffered 6 crew deaths on the voyage.

Slave trading voyage #3 (1803-1804): Captain Robert Martin acquired a letter of marque on 11 October 1805. He sailed from Liverpool on 2 November 1805, bound for the Bight of Biafra and Gulf of Guinea islands.

== Fate ==
The privateer Prince of Peace (probably Spanish Principe de Paz), of twelve 12-pounder guns and 160 men captured Lord Nelson at 13°20′N 55°20′W as Lord Nelson was sailing from Africa to Saint Lucia. She arrived at Cayenne around 5 May.
