= Goodrich (ship) =

Several vessels have been named Goodrich:

== Goodrich (1779 ship) ==
- Goodrich (1779 ship), of 250 tons (bm), was launched at Newbury. She first appeared in Lloyd's Register (LR) in the volume for 1781 with Buchanan, master, Ingram, owner, and trade London privateer. Captain John Buchanan acquired a letter of marque on 28 December 1780. Goodrich was armed with twenty 12-pounder guns and six 12-pounder carronades, and had a crew of 120 men. In 1781 she captured a number of valuable prizes, including the Dutch merchantmen Leendert & Matthy's, and Margaretta Catharina. On 10 October 1781 Goodrich had an inconclusive single ship action with the American letter of marque St James, which was under the command of Thomas Truxtun. Goodrich was last listed in 1783.

== Goodrich (1793 ship) ==
- Goodrich (1793 ship) was a brig launched in Bermuda. She made three voyages as a slave ship between 1795 and 1799. She then became a general merchantman and was wrecked in 1808.

== Goodrich (1799 schooner) ==
- Goodrich (1799 schooner) was launched in Liverpool. She made seven voyages as a slave ship between 1799 and 1807, two of them while being owned by Americans. After the Slave Trade Act 1807 ended the British slave trade she became a merchantman. A French privateer captured her in June or July 1808.

== See also ==
- USS Goodrich (DD-831)
