= Action of 3 May 1920 =

3 May 1920
- Part of the Southern Front of the Russian Civil War
Date	3 May 1920
Location	off Ochakov, Black Sea
Result	Soviet victory

Belligerents
France	Russian SFSR

Strength
1 aviso	1 floating battery

Casualties and losses
1 aviso captured	None

The action of 3 May 1920 was a short single-ship action fought off Ochakov during the Russian Civil War between a French Navy aviso and a Bolshevik floating battery.

== Background ==
During the Russian Civil War, the French Navy took part of the Allied Intervention by providing assistance to the White faction engaged on the Southern Front. The French Navy suffered a mutiny in 1919 but operations continued until the end of the conflict.

== Action ==
According to French sources, the French aviso Le Scarpe imprudently advanced into the territorial waters of Soviet Russia near Novorossiysk during a routine patrol in the Black Sea. Le Scarpe's commander wanted to sail to Nikolaiev to collect information about procuring supplies. The French warship encountered the Soviet floating battery Krasnaya Zarya near Ochakov; during the subsequent fight Le Scarpe was damaged and surrendered. This happened near the end of the Russian Civil War, and the ship was soon returned.
