= Capture of the Jeune Richard =

1807 battle of the Caribbean campaign of 1803–1810

Coordinates: 13°53′N 58°01′W

- Part of the Caribbean campaign of 1803–1810
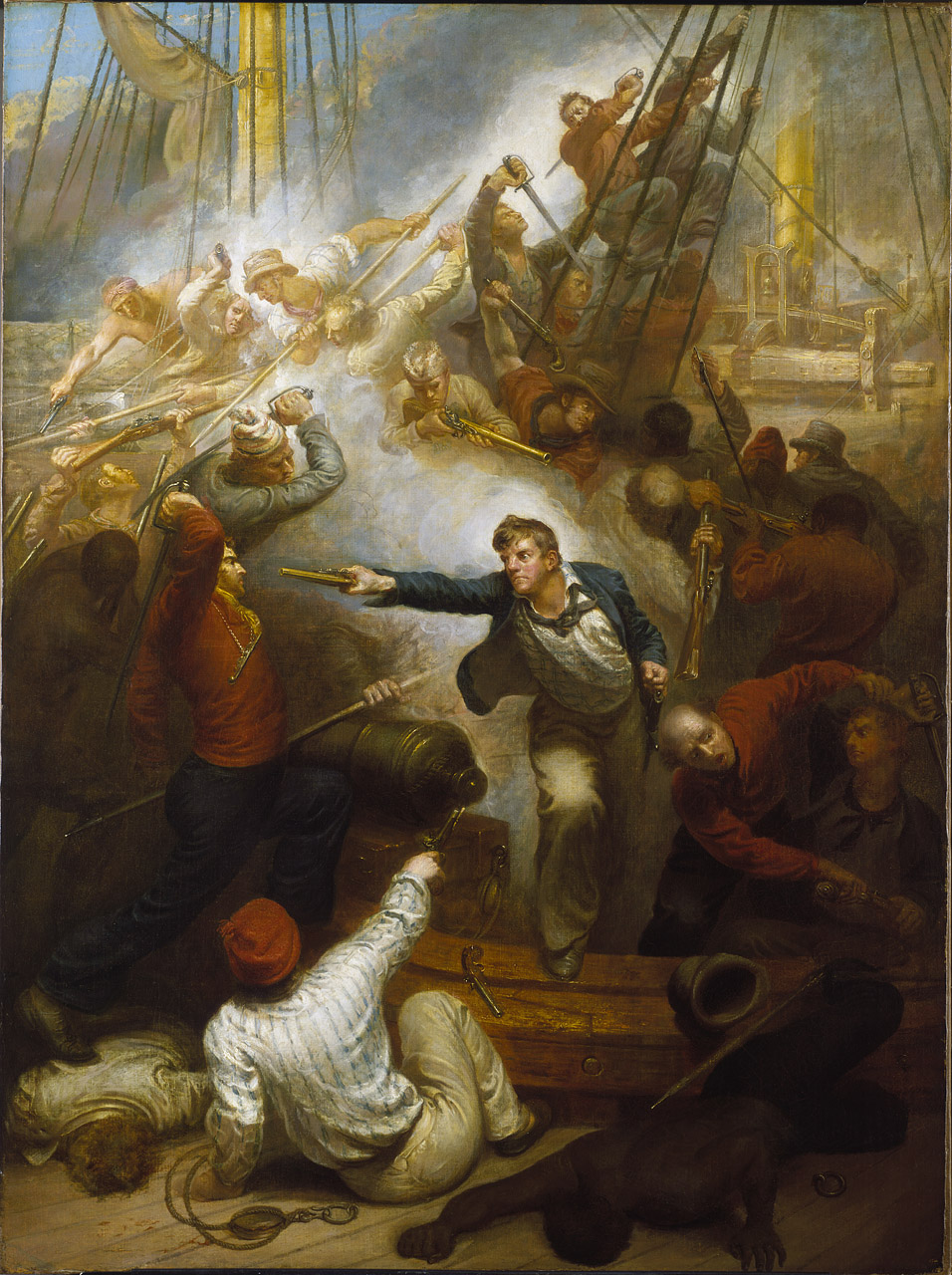
- Captain William Rogers Capturing the 'Jeune Richard', 1 October 1807; Samuel Drummond, 1808
Date	1 October 1807
Location	off Barbados, Caribbean Sea
Result	British victory

Belligerents
United Kingdom	France

Commanders and leaders
William Rogers	Unknown

Strength
1 packet ship	1 privateer

Casualties and losses
13 killed or wounded	54 killed or wounded 1 privateer captured

The capture of the Jeune Richard was the result of a naval engagement that took place in the Caribbean on 1 October 1807, during the Napoleonic Wars between the British packet ship Windsor Castle and the French privateer Jeune Richard. In an unequal battle, Windsor Castle, under the command of her acting captain William Rogers, not only defended repeated attacks from the privateer, but finally engaged her, boarded her and after overpowering the much larger crew, forced them below decks, and took the privateer as its prize. The victory was widely reported in contemporary papers and journals, and Rogers and his crew were hailed as heroes and lavishly rewarded for their valour.

== Background ==
The Windsor Castle sailed from England under the command of Acting Captain William Rogers, bound for the Leeward Islands and Barbados in September 1807, carrying the mail. She carried six 4-pounder guns and two 9-pounder carronades and had a crew of 28 men and boys. Early on the morning of 1 October a sail was sighted and by half past eight the mystery ship was piling on sail to catch the packet. Identifying her as a privateer schooner, Rogers attempted to outrun the enemy, but she continued to close and he realised he would be compelled to fight. His enemy was the Jeune Richard, carrying six long 6-pounder guns and one long 18-pounder gun, a considerably heavier weight of shot than the Windsor Castle. The Jeune Richard also had a crew of 92, over three times that of the British packet.

== Battle ==
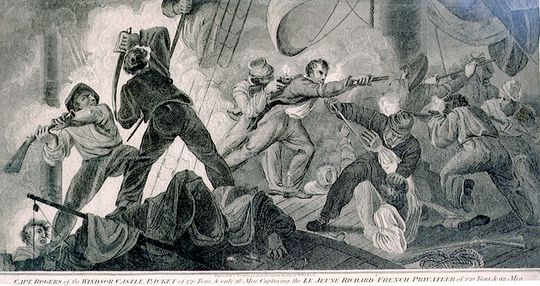
A contemporary engraving of the sort that popularised Rogers' exploits.

Rogers prepared for action and stood by to sink the mail should it become necessary to keep it out of enemy hands. By noon the Jeune Richard had closed the distance and, running up the French colours, she opened fire. The Windsor Castle returned fire, at which the French called on Rogers to surrender. He refused, so the Jeune Richard ran alongside the Windsor Castle deploying grappling irons, and attempted to board. The Windsor Castle′s crew mustered with pikes and repelled the boarders, killing or wounding between eight and ten of the French. The Jeune Richard′s crew attempted to cut the lines and pull away but the Windsor Castle′s main yard remained locked in the privateer's rigging, holding the two ships together.

The fighting continued for several hours, but by 3pm one of the Windsor Castle′s 9-pounder carronades had been brought up on deck and loaded with double grape, canister and 100 musket balls. When the French made another attempt to force their way aboard, the British discharged it to great effect, sweeping the privateer's decks and causing considerable casualties and damage. Rogers then led five of his men onto the Jeune Richard and forced the French from their guns, driving them below after a fierce fight and securing control of the privateer. With the French crew trapped below but still considerably greater in number than the small British force that had control of the decks, Rogers ordered each Frenchman up on deck one at a time, where he had them placed in irons.

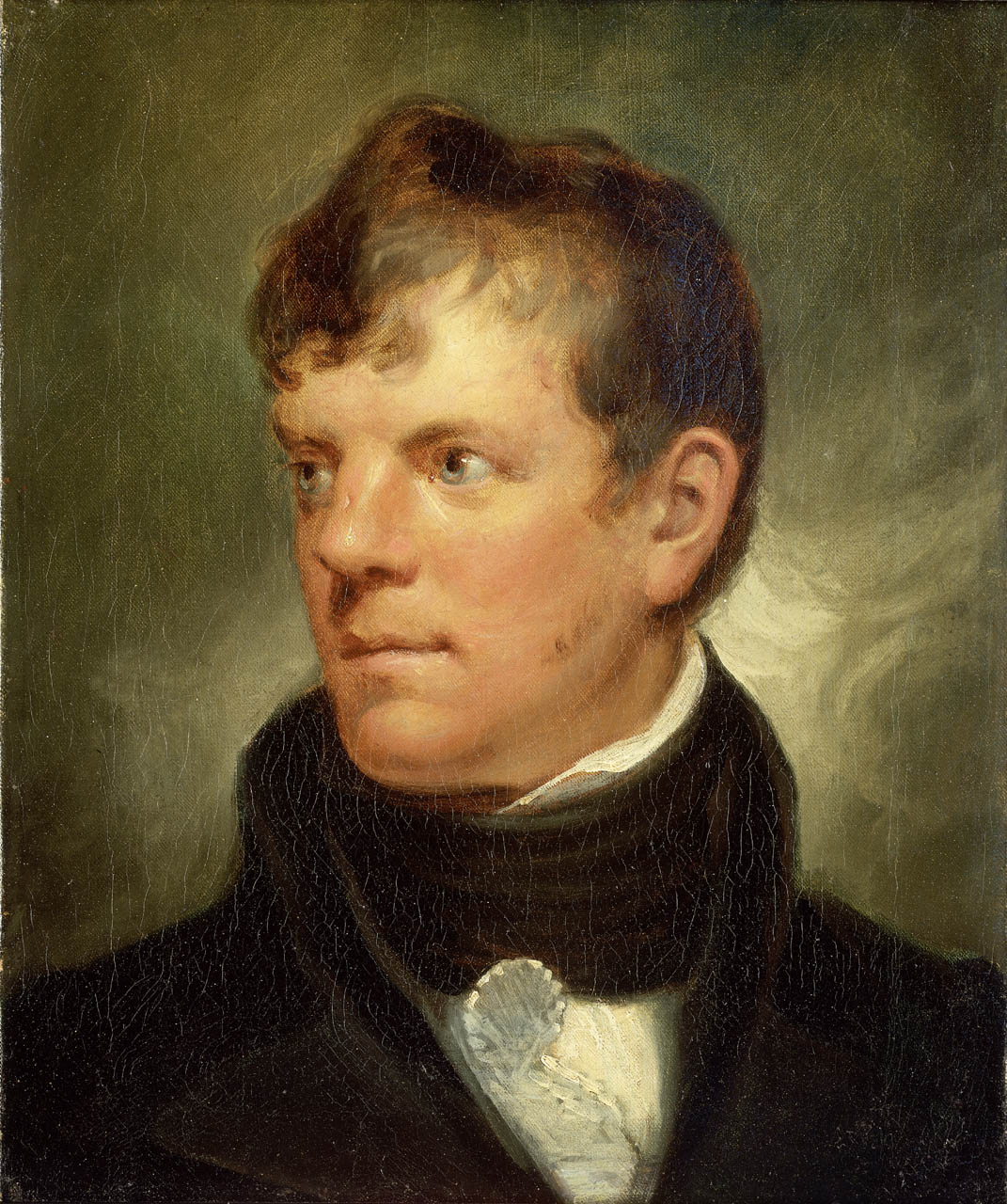
Acting-Captain William Rogers, of the Windsor Castle.

== Aftermath ==
With the Jeune Richard secured, Rogers took her and the Windsor Castle to the nearest British port. The British had three dead and ten wounded, the French had twenty-one dead and thirty-three wounded. Rogers then made his report to the officer commanding the station, Admiral Sir Alexander Cochrane. Cochrane forwarded his report to the Admiralty, adding an accompanying note:

Sir, The enclosed letter which I have just received from Mr. Rogers, the master of the Windsor Castle packet, gives an account of the capture of a French privateer. It is an instance of bravery and persevering courage, combined with great presence of mind, as was scarcely ever exceeded. He has shewn such ability defending one of His Majesty's packets, that I hope it will secure him the command of the first which is vacant.

— I have the honour to be, &c, Alexander Cochrane

The news of how Rogers had turned upon his pursuer and taken her as his prize created a sensation. The account appeared in numerous newspapers, journals and periodicals. Societies and guilds joined to raise subscriptions to reward Rogers and his crew. In addition to sums of money, Rogers received two swords, a piece of plate worth 100 guineas, a vase worth £60, and command of another packet ship. The artist Samuel Drummond painted Rogers' portrait, and also created a depiction of the action, while other engravers and artists produced versions to illustrate the stories carried in the papers.
