= Chambers (1776 ship) =

West Indiaman launched in Bristol

History

Great Britain
- Name: Chambers
- Builder: Bristol
- Launched: 1776
- Captured: 7 October 1782

General characteristics
- Tons burthen: 200, or 220, or 300, or 350 (bm)
- Armament: 1776:10 × 6-pounder + 2 × 9-pounder guns; 1779:12 × 6-pounder + 4 × 9-pounder guns

Chambers was a ship launched in Bristol in 1776. She spent most of her brief career as a West Indiaman. An American privateer captured her in October 1782 in a single ship action.

== Career ==
Chambers first appeared in Lloyd's Register in 1776.

Year	Master	Owner	Trade	Source
1776	Jn.Wallace; Jn.Langley	Dinham & Co.	Bristol-Petersburg; Bristol–Jamaica	LR
1778	A.Frizwell	Dinham & Co.	Bristol–Jamaica	LR

The British Admiralty gave notice in April 1777, that they were ready to issue letters of marque for privateers against the Americans. In March 1778, Great Britain broke off relations with France. Captain Abraham Frizwell acquired a letter of marque on 28 September 1778. (Note: Seventeen seventy-eight was a poor year for privateering. Of the owners of the 14 Bristol privateers and seven letters-of-marque, all but one or two suffered disastrous losses in 1778 (prior to end-September).)

Chambers arrived at Jamaica in May 1779. On her way she captured a brig sailing from St Domingo to Bordeaux, which Chambers sent into New York. She set into Jamaica a schooner that was carrying rum and molasses, and a sloop into New Providence. Chambers had also repelled an attack by two American privateers, one of 16 and the other of 12 guns. The encounter had take place in the Gulf of Florida and lasted two hours before the Americans broke it off.

Year	Master	Owner	Trade	
1779	A.Frizwell; J.Langley	Dinham & Co.	Bristol–Jamaica	LR

Captain John Langley acquired a letter of marque on 28 August 1779.

Year	Master	Owner	Trade	Sources
1782	J.Langley	Dinham; R.Hunter?	Bristol–Jamaica; Bristol–Quebec	LR

Lloyd's List reported in March 1780 that Chambers, Langley, master, and Lord North, Webb, master, had brought an American privateer with them into Barbados.

A gale between 1 and 2 August 1781 drove Chambers, Langley, master, and some other vessels on shore at Jamaica. She was gotten off and on 20 April 1782 sailed for Quebec, which she reached.

== Loss ==
On 7 October 1782 the American privateer Buccaneer, of 22 guns, captured Chambers, Langley, master, off Cape Clear Island as Chambers was returning to Bristol from Quebec. Buccaneer sent Chambers to Lorient. Chambers only struck after an hour's engagement.
