= HMS Port Royal (1796) =

1796 schooner

HMS Port Royal was a 10-gun schooner that the British Royal Navy bought in Jamaica in 1796. The French captured her in 1797 and the British recaptured her later that year, when they renamed her HMS Recovery. She captured three privateers, one in a single-ship action, before the Navy sold her in 1801.

== Career ==
Lieutenant Elias Mann (or Man) commissioned Port Royal. On 30 March 1797 he attempted to cut out a schooner on the northern coast of Hispaniola when Port Royal ran aground on the shore near Môle-Saint-Nicolas. People on the cliff above then began to fire down on Port Royal, fire that she could not return. Because she was filling with water and was under fire, Mann and his crew could not extricate her and he surrendered. The engagement cost Port Royal one man killed and two wounded. The French renamed her Perle.

Pelican recaptured her on 18 October. (Note: Pelican and Rattler shared in the head money paid in December 1827. A first-class share was worth £51 6s 3d; a fifth-class share, that of a seaman, was worth 7s 10¾d.) The Royal Navy recommissioned her in November, renamed her HMS Recovery, and armed her with ten 3-pounder guns.

Between 29 October 1797 and 12 March 1798, Recovery captured a small French privateer. However, her most significant capture occurred in April.

On 17 April 1798 she was under the command of Lieutenant William Ross when she encountered the French privateer schooner Revanche. After an engagement of 45 to 50 minutes, Revanche struck. She was pierced for 12 guns and had 10 mounted. She had a crew of 54 men under the command of Antoine Marin. During the engagement she lost three men killed and nine wounded, four of whom were not expected to recover; Recovery had no casualties. Revanche, of Cape François, had been an unusually successful privateer, having captured 10 vessels on her previous cruise, and 19 on the cruise before that. In his report, Ross remarked that his crew were

most of them young and inexperienced Boys and Lads, but it is with real Satisfaction that I assure you, that all of them displayed the greatest Cheerfulness and Firmness during the Action, and that their Conduct would do much honour to the most experienced Seamen.

Then on 29 April near Saint Ann's Bay, Jamaica, Recovery encountered the French privateer schooner Incrédule, which she captured after a chase of two hours. Incrédule was armed with two 6-pounder guns and four swivel guns, and had a crew of 33 men. She had captured a Danish vessel and a shallop with 20 hogsheads of sugar; a merchant vessel had retaken the shallop. Thirty years later, in July 1828, head money was paid for 84 men on the two prizes. (Note: A first-class share was worth £122 12s 6d; a fifth-class share was worth £2 12s 8¾d.)

== Fate ==
Recovery was sold in 1801.

== Merchantman ==
Recovery may be the brig of 92 tons (bm), of French origin, and built in 1796 that entered Lloyd's Register in 1801. Her master was J. Hart, her owner J. Joseph, and her trade Bristol-Alderney. In May 1802 Recovery (of Plymouth), Hart, master, sprung a leak. Hart ran her ashore at Cleethorpes, on the Lincolnshire coast. She was later got off and put into the Humber. She was last listed in 1809 with trade Hull-Coruna.
