= Active (1799 ship) =

History

Great Britain
- Name: Active
- Launched: 1799, Bristol
- Fate: Last listed 1819

General characteristics
- Tons burthen: 150, or 156 (bm)
- Complement: 30 (1799)
- Armament: 1799: 14 × 4&6-pounder guns; 1811: 2 × 6-pounder + 8 × 4-pounder guns; 1814: 2 guns

Active was built in Bristol in 1799. She made one voyage as a slave ship in the triangular trade in enslaved persons, and then two voyages trading between Bristol and Africa. A French privateer captured her but a Guernsey privateer recaptured her. She then became a West Indiaman. On 16 and 17 July 1808 she repelled a Spanish and a French privateer in two separate single-ship actions. In 1809 she underwent a maritime mishap. She was last listed in 1819.

== Career ==
Active first appeared in the 1799 volume of Lloyd's Register (LR).

Year	Master	Owner	Trade	Source
1799	Arindell	Anderson	Bristol–Africa	LR

Slave voyage (1799–1801): Captain Elisha Arrindell sailed from Bristol on 15 July 1799. Active acquired her slaves in the Sierra Leone estuary. She arrived at Demerara, and Kingston, Jamaica on 15 October 1800. Captain Arrindell had died before she arrived at Demerara; Captain Duffy had replaced him. She arrived with 73 slaves in Kingston, having perhaps landed a smaller number in Demerara first. Active arrived back at Bristol on 3 February 1801.

Year	Master	Owner	Trade	Source
1802	Arindell; Broadfoot	Anderson	Bristol–Africa & Barbados	LR

Captain James Broadfoot sailed from Bristol on 13 March 1801. The voyage was not a slave voyage; Active returned to Bristol on 22 September. Captain Broadfoot had died during the voyage.

Year	Master	Owner	Trade	Source
1803	Broadfoot; W.Jones	Anderson	Bristol–Barbados	LR

On 30 May 1803 Captain William Jones sailed for Cape Coast Castle. Again, the voyage was a trading voyage, not a slave voyage. Active arrived at Cape Coast Castle on 2 August and four days later sailed to Leeward. She returned directly to Bristol, arriving there on 15 October 1804.

Year	Master	Owner	Trade	Source
1805	W.Jones; Silcock	Anderson	Bristol–Amsterdam	LR

In February 1806, a French privateer captured Active, Silcock, master, and three other West Indiamen. Active had been sailing from Demerara for Bristol. The Guernsey privateer Speculator recaptured Active and sent her into Guernsey. (Note: On 13 June 1804 Noah Le Sueus had acquired a letter of marque for the ship Specullator, of 281 tons (bm), eight guns, and 30 men.)

Year	Master	Owner	Trade	Source
1806	J.Silcock; J.Chissel	Anderson; Vining & Co.	Bristol–Demerara	LR
1807	J.Chissel; T.Teed	Vining & Co. Forester & Co.	Bristol–Demerara	LR

In January 1808, the "fast sailing, coppered brig" Active, of London, was offered for sale. She was of 154 tons (bm), armed with 14 guns, and had just returned from a month's cruise.

On 18 July 1808 J.L.Forester, Active's owner, was aboard her when he wrote a letter from Chaquaramas, Trinidad. On 16 July she had been approaching the Demerara river when a Spanish privateer approached. Active was able to repel the attacker in a 40-minute running engagement, but then found herself unable to enter the river. She then sailed to Trinidad. At 6a.m. as she approached Trinidad she encountered a French privateer. She was able to repel the privateer in an engagement of an hour-and-a-half before she could escape. She had no casualties from either engagement, and little damage beyond some cannon shots through her sails.

On 9 August as Active was sailing from Trinidad to Hayti she encountered HMS Garland, which detained her and sent her to Jamaica.

On 9 February 1809 Active, Teed, master, was returning to Britain from Jamaica when she was driven ashore at Milford. It was expected that Active would be gotten off, but that she would have to unload. She was refloated the next day after having discharged all her cargo between decks.

Year	Master	Owner	Trade	Source & notes
1810	Brown	L.Forester	London-Hayti	LR; damages repaired 1809
1813	Brown; R.Watson	T.Foster	London–Gibraltar	LR; damages repaired 1809
1814	Duckworth	T.Foster	London–Gibraltar	LR; damages repaired 1809
1815	R.Watson; Duckworth	T.Foster	London–Malta	LR; damages repaired 1809

== Fate ==
Active was last listed in 1819.
