= Windsor Castle (1804 packet) =

History

United Kingdom
- Name: Windsor Castle
- Namesake: Windsor Castle
- Owner: Sutton
- Builder: Yarmouth
- Launched: 1804
- Captured: 1815

General characteristics
- Tons burthen: 191 (bm)
- Propulsion: Sail
- Sail plan: Brig
- Complement: 1807:28; 1815:32 crew + 9 passengers
- Armament: 1807:6 × 4-pounder guns + 2 × 9-pounder carronades; 1815:2 × 9-pounder guns + 8 carronades

Windsor Castle was launched at Yarmouth in 1804. She spent her entire 11-year career as a Falmouth packet, primarily on the Falmouth–Halifax–New York–Halifax–Falmouth route and the Falmouth–Leeward Islands–Falmouth route. She also sailed on some other voyages. She was involved in two notable single-ship actions. In the first, in 1807, she captured her attacker, a French privateer schooner, in a sanguinary encounter. In the second, in 1815, an American privateer captured her. A prize crew took her into Norfolk, Virginia, where she was sold at auction.

== Career ==
Windsor Castle first appeared in Lloyd's Register (LR) in 1804 with R. Sutton, master, Sutton, owner, and trade Yarmouth-Falmouth. R. Sutton was Robert Shuttleworth Sutton, who had been appointed her captain on 20 June 1804.

On 15 September 1804 Windsor Castle sailed from Falmouth for Jamaica.

1805 Windsor Castle arrived at Falmouth on 6 January 1805 after a 46-day journey from Jamaica. She then sailed for Jamaica on 12 February; she arrived at Barbados on 14 April.

On 15 April Windsor Castle left Jamaica. She arrived at Falmouth on 9 June, after a voyage of 56 days.

Captain Sutton sailed from Falmouth on 8 July 1805 and arrived at Halifax on 6 August. Windsor Castle apparently sailed the same day and arrived a New York on 21 August. She remained in New York until 3 October. She then arrived in Halifax on 5 October, left shortly thereafter, and returned to Falmouth on 8 November.

While Windsor Castle was on this voyage LL reported on 27 August that Windsor Castle had been captured while outward bound and taken to Corruna. On 24 September LL reported that Windsor Castle had in fact arrived at Halifax.

On 11 December Windsor Castle sailed from Falmouth to Barbados and Jamaica.

1806 On 20 January 1806 Windsor Castle arrived at Jamaica.

Captain Sutton sailed from Falmouth on 12 May 1806. Windsor Castle left Halifax on 7 June and arrived at New York in June. She left New York on 7 August and left at Halifax on 19 August. She arrived back at Falmouth on 4 September.

On 7 October Captain Sutton sailed from Falmouth, bound for Halifax and New York. She arrived at Halifax on 24 November and New York on 13 December.

1807 Windsor Castle sailed from New York on 27 January 1807 and arrived at Falmouth on 4 February.

On 12 March Windsor Castle sailed from Falmouth, bound for Jamaica. She was off Jamaica by 28 April, and arrived back at Falmouth on 11 July, after a voyage of 55 days.

On 28 August Windsor Castle sailed from Falmouth, bound for the Leeward Islands. Sutton remained at Falmouth on this occasion and her master, William Rogers, sailed her as acting captain.

=== Jeune Richard ===
Lloyd's List reported on 10 November 1807 that Windsor Castle, of eight guns and 28 men and boys, had on 2 October captured the privateer Jeune Richard, of 14 guns and 96 men, after a two-and-a-half hour engagement. Jeune Richard had 56 men killed and wounded; Windsor Castle four killed and eight wounded. Windsor Castle carried her prize into Barbadoes.

The encounter had taken place at 13°53′N 58°1′W. The French tried to board Windsor Castle, but her crew repelled the boarding attempt while inflicting heavy casualties on the French attackers. Eventually, the British were able to board Jeune Richard, drive her crew below deck, and capture her.

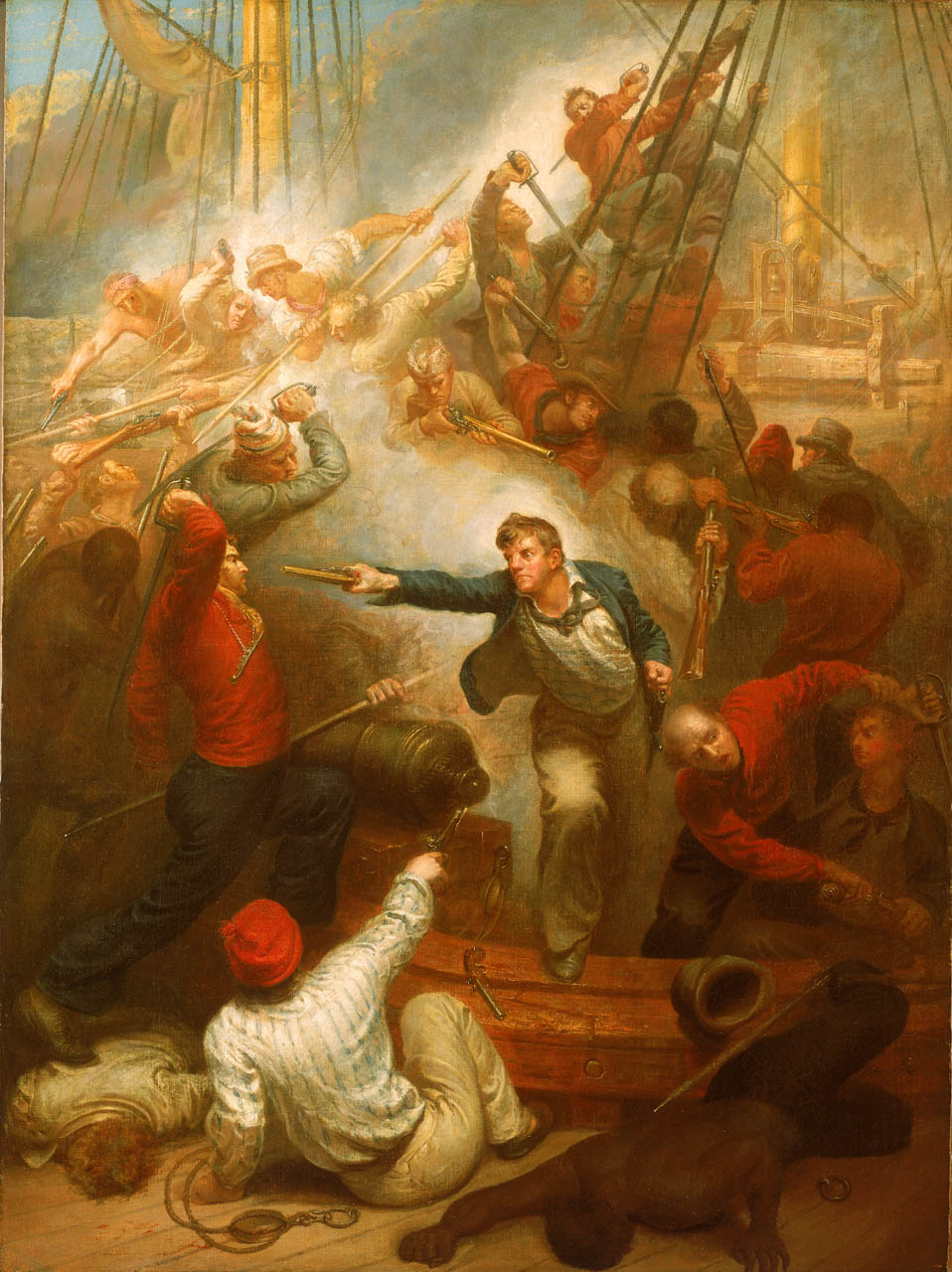
Captain William Rogers Capturing the 'Jeune Richard', 1 October 1807, by Samuel Drummond

When Windsor Castle arrived at Carlisle Bay, Barbados, Rogers wrote an after-action letter to Admiral Alexander Cochrane, the commander of the Leeward Islands Station. Rogers listed his casualties as amounting to three killed and ten wounded. He gave French casualties as 21 killed and 33 wounded. He described Jeune Richard as having a crew of 92 men, and an armament of one 18-pounder gun and six 6-pounder guns. After he had captured Jeune Richard, Rogers had her crew come on deck one by one and placed irons on them as the survivors still outnumbered his own men. Cochrane wrote a highly complementary letter of transmission to the Admiralty. The victory was widely reported in contemporary papers and journals, and Rogers and his crew were hailed as heroes and lavishly rewarded for their valour.

Windsor Castle arrived at Barbados on 3 October. She arrived back at Falmouth on 20 December, after a voyage of 42 days from Tortola.

1808 On 26 January 1808 Windsor Castle sailed for the Leeward Islands.

Captain Sutton sailed from Falmouth on 7 June 1808. Windsor Castle arrived at Halifax on 26 July and left on 1 August. She arrived at New York on 10 August and left on 10 September. She left Halifax on 27 September and arrived back at Falmouth on 18 October.

1809 Captain Sutton sailed from Falmouth on 15 June 1809. Windsor Castle arrived at Halifax on 13 July and left on 16 July. She arrived at New York on 26 July and left on 18 September. She arrived at Halifax on 27 September and left on 30 September. She arrived back at Falmouth on 29 October.

On 6 November Windsor Castle sailed from Falmouth, bound for Jamaica. She arrived there on 14 December and sailed that day for Barbados.

1810 Windsor Castle arrived at Falmouth on 13 February 1810, having sailed from Jamaica on 8 January.

On 22 March she sailed for Jamaica. On 23 April she arrived at Barbados. She sailed from Jamaica on 11 June and arrived off Falmouth on 20 July.

She sailed for Jamaica on 8 August. LL has her arriving at Antigua on 6 August, which is surely a typographical error for September as she arrived at Barbados on 9 September. Windsor Castle left Jamaica on 8 October.

On 30 November the crew of Severn abandoned her at 49°31′N 10°40′W). Severn was on a voyage from Quebec to Greenock when she became leaky and in a sinking state. Windsor Packet rescued the crew. Windsor Castle arrived at Plymouth on 4 December.

1811 On 28 January 1811 Windsor Castle sailed from Plymouth, bound for Demerara. On 10 March she arrived at Falmouth from Demerara.

On 22 April she sailed from Falmouth to Cadiz and Malta. On 4 August she returned to Falmouth, having left Malta on 12 June and Gibraltar on 11 July.

Windsor Castle arrived at Madeira on 16 September and sailed on the 17th for the Brazils. She arrived at Rio de Janeiro on 25 October.

1812 Windsor Castle arrived back at Falmouth on 7 February 1812, having left Rio on 7 November and Bahia on 10 December.

On 1 March she sailed from Falmouth to Jamaica. She returned, and then on 17 June sailed for Malta. On 30 June she was at Gibraltar. She sailed again from Falmouth for Malta on 22 November.

1813 Windsor Castle reached Malta and returned to Falmouth on 14 February 1813. On 10 March she sailed from Falmouth, bound for the Leeward Islands. On 5 April she arrived at Barbados after a voyage of 26 days. She arrived back at Falmouth on 31 May. She sailed from Barbadoes on the 7th, St. Lucia on the 8th, Martinique on the 12th, Dominica on the 15th, Guadaloupe on the 18th, Antigua on the 24th, Montserrat on the 25th, Nevis on the 26th, and St. Kitt's on the 29th. She was at Tortola on 2 May and St. Thomas on 6 May.

On 9 August Windsor Castle sailed for Cadiz, Gibraltar, and Malta. She arrived at Cadiz on 24 August. On 19 November Windsor Castle was off Falmouth and proceeded to Stangate Creek. On 28 December she arrived at Falmouth from Stangate Creek.

1814 On 6 February she arrived at Madeira, and on the 8th she sailed for Teneriffe and the Brazils. On 19 March she arrived at Rio de Janeiro.

Windsor Castle sailed on 25 June from Falmouth for the Leeward Islands. She arrived at Barbados on 25 July. On 28 August she left St Thomas, and on 27 September arrived at Falmouth.

On 8 November she sailed from Falmouth, bound for Lisbon and the Mediterranean. She arrived at Lisbon on the 15th, and sailed that same day for the Mediterranean.

== Fate ==
Windsor Castle arrived at Falmouth on 28 January 1815. She had left Malta on 15 December 1814, and Gibraltar on 12 January 1815.

Captain Sutton sailed Windsor Castle from Falmouth on 28 February 1815.

She was on her way to Halifax when she encountered the American privateer Roger, Roger Quarles, master, on 15 March at 36°20′N 20°10′W. Roger was a schooner of 10 guns and 120 men. Another account gives Roger's armament as ten 12-pounder carronades, two 6-pounder guns, one 5 1/2" howitzer, and one 18-pounder gun on a pivot mount. Windsor Castle had two 9-pounder guns and eight 9-pounder carronades.

During the subsequent action Roger had one man killed and Windsor Castle had four wounded: Sutton, the surgeon, a passenger, and a seaman. Sutton sank the mails before he struck.

The Americans put Sutton, the mate, the carpenter, and a boy on a merchant vessel which took them back to England. The rest of Windsor Castle's crew were confined below deck on her.

Quarles put a prize crew on board Windsor Castle and she and Roger sailed together until 21 March, when they parted. Still, both reached Norfolk about 25 April. After Windsor Castle arrived at Norfolk some members of her crew attacked their guards and attempted to recapture her. Two of her crew were killed in the altercation.

Although the capture occurred after the war had ended, a prize court declared Windsor Castle a lawful prize. A Mr. William Taylor purchased her for $7000 at auction on 1 June.
