= Union Island (1794 ship) =

British merchant ship 1794–1821

History

Great Britain
- Name: Union Island
- Namesake: Union Island
- Owner: 1801–1804: S. & J. Span; 1805–1806:Fletcher; 1807–1818:Lawrence; 1818–1821:Tobin & Co.
- Builder: Bristol
- Launched: 1794
- Fate: Sank 27 June 1821

General characteristics
- Tons burthen: 318, or 324 (bm)
- Propulsion: Sail
- Complement: 35
- Armament: 10 × 9-pounder guns

Union Island was a merchant vessel launched at Bristol in 1794. In 1801, she participated in two single-ship actions. In the first, she repelled an attack by a Spanish privateer. In a later attack that year a French privateer captured her. She returned to English ownership in 1802. She then sailed as a West Indiaman until about 1818 when she started sailing between Liverpool and Africa. She was wrecked on 27 June 1821 on the coast of Africa.

== Career ==
Union Island was launched at Bristol in 1794. She first appeared in Lloyd's Register (LR) that same year.

Year	Master	Owner	Trade	Source
1794	W.Pocock	S.&J.Span	Bristol–St Vincent	LR

Captain William James Pocock acquired a letter of marque for Union Island on 6 December 1794.

In November 1795 Pocock was still her master; she was described at the time as "half frigate built". Pocock remained her master until 1801.

Year	Master	Owner	Trade	Source
1799	Pocock	S&J Span	Bristol-St. Vincent	LR
1800	Pocock; R. Dormer	S&J Span	Bristol-St. Vincent	LR
1801	R. Dormer	S&J Span	Bristol-St. Vincent	LR

On 11 January 1798, Union Island was part of a convoy that left Cork for the West Indies. During the voyage a gale came up that separated several vessels, Union Island among them, from their Royal Navy escorts. Captain Pocock took over the task of escorting the separated vessels to their destination. In April, the Master of Lloyd's, at Barbados, wrote to her owners, Samauel John Span and Company, informing them that a subscription had been launched at Lloyd's that had gathered more than £60, and that Lloyd's would arrange for a suitably engraved piece of silver for presentation to Captain Pocock for his services. The masters of the 16 vessels escorted also wrote a letter to Pocock, thanking him for his service to them.

On 18 April 1801, Union Island, Dormer, master was sailing from St Vincent and about 70 miles from Tortola when a Spanish privateer attacked her. Union Island was able to repulse the attack, but with the loss of one man killed and Dormer and her mate wounded. She then put into Tortola, which she left on 1 May. A letter from Tortola dated 23 April gave a detailed account of the action. It reported that the privateer had a crew of some 150 men, and had probably sustained heavy casualties. Casualties aboard Union Island consisted of two men killed, Captain Dormer and four seamen seriously wounded, and one seaman lightly wounded.

Shortly thereafter Union Island encountered a French privateer and after a severe engagement, Dormer was forced to strike. The privateer sent Union Island and another prize, Sally, into Puerto Rico.

Her entry in Lloyd's Register for 1802 carried the annotation, "Captured". That information continued to the volume for 1803.

Year	Master	Owner	Trade	Source & notes
1802	R.Dormer	S.&J.Span	Bristol–St Vincent	LR

Still, in April 1802, i.e., shortly after the Treaty of Amiens, Union Island was advertised for sale in London and described as sailing well and carrying "a remarkable large cargo for her tonnage."

Union Island re-entered Lloyd's Register in 1804.

Year	Master	Owner	Trade	Source
1804	Rd.Sibson	Fletcher	Liverpool–Jamaica	LR
1805	R. Sibson	Fletcher	Liverpool-Jamaica	LR
1806	R. Sibson; J. Simms	Fletcher	Liverpool-Jamaica	LR
1807	R. Sibson	Lawrence	Liverpool–Jamaica	LR
1808	R. Sibson	Lawrence	Liverpool-Jamaica	LR
1809	R. Sibson	Lawrence	Liverpool-Maryland	LR
1810	R. Sibson	Lawrence	Liverpool-St Croix; Liverpool-Jamaica	LR
1813	R. Sibson; Christopher (or Christopherson)	Lawrence	Liverpool-Jamaica	LR
1816	Christopher; Clark	Lawrence	Cork—Jamaica	LR
1817	Not published or not available online			
1818	R. Conner; R. Taylor	Lawrence; Tobin & Co.	Liverpool-Jamaica; Liverpool-Africa	LR
1821	G. Howard; Muse	Tobin & Co.	Liverpool-Africa	LR
1822	G. Howard; Muse	Tobin & Co.	Liverpool-Africa	LR

== Fate ==
Lloyd's List for 29 September 1821 reported that Union Island, Muir, master, had sunk in the Dure River, with the loss of three crewmen drowned. Apparently she was sailing from Liverpool to Calabar when she struck on a sunken rock near the "Dure River" (possibly the river by Duke Town, Calabar), on the coast of Africa on 27 June and was totally lost.

Captain Muir proceeded to Calabar in the schooner Union. Captain Spence, master of Elizabeth, of London, after three days rescued 18 crew members from Dure where they had landed and been stripped of their clothes. He took them to Sierra Leone, arriving with 17, an apprentice having died on the way. Four men remained on Elizabeth, Captain Spence having offered to take them to London.
