= French corvette Républicaine (1795) =

Républicaine
History

France
- Name: Républicaine
- Builder: Le Havre
- Launched: 1793
- Acquired: 1795 by requisition
- Captured: October 1795

Great Britain
- Name: Republican
- Acquired: by capture October 1795
- Fate: Sold 1803

General characteristics
- Tons burthen: 200 (bm)
- Complement: French service:10 officers and 240 men; British service:100
- Armament: French service: 18 x 4 or 6-pounder guns; British service: 18 guns

The French corvette Républicaine (AKA Republican and Republique) was a merchant ship launched in 1793 that the French Navy requisitioned in 1795 at Grenada. On 14 October 1795, HMS Mermaid captured her in the Leeward Islands. The Royal Navy took Republicaine into service as HMS Republican (or Republicaine), a lugger of 18 guns. It is not clear that Republican was ever commissioned. The Navy sold her at Grenada in 1803.

== French service ==
On 5 September 1794, Esther, Devonish, master, encountered Républicaine, which Devonish described as being armed with twenty 6-pounder guns and 18 swivel guns, and having a crew of 100-150 men. (Note: Although this engagement occurred before the French Navy acquired Républicaine, Powell identifies Républicaine as the vessel the Royal Navy later captured. She may have been a privateer at the time.) At 5p.m. a four-hour engagement commenced that resumed the next morning, when after two-and-a-half hours Républicaine withdrew. Esther had one man fatally wounded, her mate, out of a crew of 18 men and three boys.

== Capture ==
On 10 October 1795, HMS Mermaid captured the 10-gun French brig Brutus off Grenada. Brutus had been in the company of a ship, which temporarily escaped. However, on 14 October, Mermaid was able to find and capture the ship after a fight of half an hour that cost Mermaid one man killed and three men wounded. The French ship was the French corvette Républicaine, and she was armed with eighteen guns. She had some 250-260 men aboard at the start of the action, one of whom was a French general. He was sailing with his staff on his way to take command of Grenada. In the action, the French lost 20 men killed and some wounded. Zebra shared by agreement. The Royal Navy took Républicaine into service as HMS Republican.
