= Decatur (1813 ship) =

South Carolinian schooner

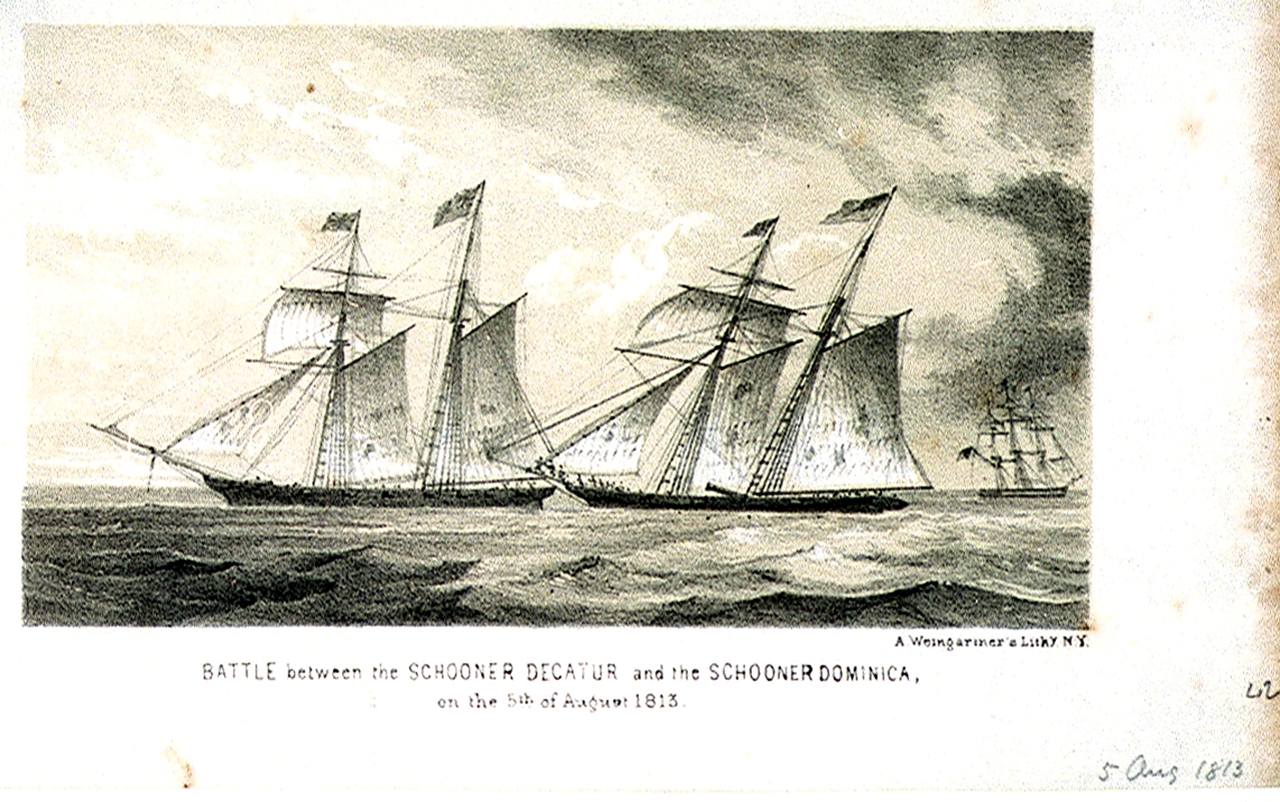
- Decatur & HMS Dominica, 1812

History

United States
- Name: Decatur
- Namesake: Stephen Decatur
- Operator: Dominique Diron
- Builder: Pritchard & Shrewbury, Charleston, South Carolina
- Launched: 13 March 1813
- Maiden voyage: 27 May 1813
- Home port: Charleston, South Carolina
- Captured: 5 June 1814

General characteristics
- Type: schooner
- Tons burthen: 240 (bm)
- Complement: 103 officers and men
- Armament: 1 × 18-pounder Long Tom + 6 × 12-pounder guns

Decatur was an American schooner built in Charleston, South Carolina, in 1813 for privateering during the Atlantic Ocean theater of the War of 1812. She was named for the United States Navy Commodore Stephen Decatur, who served with distinction in many of America's earliest conflicts. She was the largest privateer out of Charleston. The Royal Navy captured Decatur in 1814.

== Career ==
Decatur is best known for being commanded by Captain Dominique Diron, who captured several British ships during the Napoleonic Wars and the War of 1812. Captain Diron defeated the stronger Royal Navy schooner HMS Dominica in an action off Bermuda on 5 August 1813. After a long engagement the Americans chased down Dominica and boarded, forcing down her colors and killing her commander in the process.

The next day, Decatur captured the merchantman London Trader and sent her into Charleston, where she arrived on 20 August. London Trader, Sinclair, master, had been carrying a cargo of 200Hhds of sugar, 120Hhds of molasses, 70 bags of coffee, rum, cotton, and the like from Surinam to London.

London Trader may have been in company with Dominica, and though armed, had taken no part in the battle. Similarly, the merchantman Princess Charlotte, also in company and also armed, had observed the battle and when she saw that Dominica had surrendered, had herself escaped.

Decatur also captured General Hodgson, sailing from Surinam to Cayenne, and sent her into Charleston.

In November Decatur went to sea again. However, after cruising for 80 days without success, returned to Charleston.

On 22 May 1814, Majestic recaptured Dominica, and brought her into Halifax. Dominica was lost in 1815.

== Fate ==
On 5 June 1814 HMS Rhin sighted and gave chase to an American privateer schooner. After an eleven-hour chase Rhin captured the privateer in the Mona Passage, about four leagues from Cape Engaño. She turned out to be Decatur, still under Diron's command. Decatur, of four guns and 90 men, had sailed from Charleston on 30 March and had made no captures.
