= Irlam (ship) =

At least four ships have borne the name Irlam. (Note: George Irlam was a partner in the noted Liverpool firm of Barton, Irlam, and Higginson, together with Sir William Barton and John Higginson. The firm also owned vessels named Barton and Higginson. The firm went bankrupt in 1847.)

- Irlam (1800 ship) was launched at Liverpool and wrecked in 1812.
- Irlam (1813 ship) was launched at Liverpool and wrecked in 1824.
- Irlam (1825 ship) was launched at Liverpool and wrecked in 1831.
- Irlam was launched at Liverpool after the loss of the vessel wrecked in 1831.

The same company, Barton & Co. (actually Barton, Irlam and Higginson), owned each of the first three vessels, and each was a West Indiaman, sailing between Liverpool and the West Indies, primarily Barbados. There is too little information on the fourth to be able to confirm or refute the possibility that Barton & Co. also owned it. She did trade between Liverpool and Barbados.

- Irlam (1903) was a steel steam paddle tug launched at South Shields. She was broken up in 1953.
