= Barton, Irlam and Higginson =

Liverpool firm

Barton, Irlam and Higginson, earlier Barton & Co, was a noted Liverpool firm of shipowners specializing in the trade with Barbados in the first half of the 19th century. The three partners were William Barton, George Irlam, and John Higginson. The firm made a practice of naming several of its vessels after the partners.

== Ownership ==
The firm grew out of the operations of Thomas Barton (1753-1799) and William Barton (1755-1826) with George Irlam (1771-1832) and John Higginson (1776-1834) initially commercial assistants to Thomas Barton later becoming full partners. Thomas Barton of Liverpool and William Barton of Barbados appear as the junior joint owners with John Allanson of the Speights Town, launched in Liverpool in 1784. They subsequently took full ownership in 1792.

Thomas Barton died in 1799. In his will. Barton appointed George Irlam and John Higginson "both clerks to me" to be his trustees and executors, along with Barton's wife and the broker William Ewart. William Barton returned from Barbados and took on for a time the house Thomas had had built at Sleepers Hill, Everton. Under the terms of Thomas's will, William received a one-quarter share of the value of all Thomas's business assets, and the right of first refusal to purchase any or all of Thomas's ships and vessels at a fair valuation.

Higginson took over in Barbados, and may have joined the partnership fully around 1808. In that year the ownership of the ship Maxwell changed from Higginson to Barton & Co., and her master changed from J. Edwards to J. Irlam.

Sir William Barton, then head of Barton, Irlam and Higginson, died aged 70 in 1826. He had been knighted in 1816 when Mayor of Liverpool on presenting an address of congratulation to the Regent on the marriage of Princess Charlotte of Wales. When Barton died, Irlam and Higginson took up his shares in the vessel Higginson. George Irlam died before John Higginson, who died in 1834. Higginson's son Jonathon succeeded him as a partner in the firm.

== Business ==
Bartons specialised in the import of sugar, cotton, and spirits from the island of Barbados to Liverpool. Like other Liverpool merchants of the period, they operated primarily on a commission basis, accepting shipments from plantations in Barbados on consignment, and arranging for their sale in Liverpool to interested parties, remitting the proceeds back to Barbados less their commission—usually between 2½ and 4 percent—and less a variety of deductions and charges: for duties payable, for port and handling charges, for shipping and insurance, for warehousing and other costs; as well as for any credit advanced or financial transactions facilitated. Krichtal (2013) includes a sample account from 1798, showing a typical example of the charges and commissions made. The firm also bought goods outright for cash on its own account; but the commission system allowed it to be much less exposed to price and demand fluctuations; and to operate with rather less up-front capital.

Sugar was the mainstay of the Barbados economy, accounting (with its byproducts) for 98% of the value of the island's exports even as late as the early 1830s. But Bartons also built up a strong business in cotton. Based on a detailed analysis of weekly shipping and commodities reports in the Lancashire newspapers, Krichtal finds that Allanson & Barton were the third largest cotton importer into Liverpool from all sources in the 1780s; Thomas Barton & Co the largest importer in the 1790s; and Barton, Irlam and Higginson the second largest importer in the first decade of the 1800s. Bartons was one of only two houses to make this top ten in three of the four decades from 1770-1810; no importer remained in the list for all four decades. In respect of cotton specifically from the West Indies, Bartons was comfortably the largest importer in the period 1768-1815, shipping more than twice the volume of the next largest group. Krichtal notes that this was more cotton that the island itself could generate, and Bartons were likely also receiving cotton at Barbados from Guyana and elsewhere for trans-shipment and onward transport to Liverpool.

== Letters of Marque ==
After the declaration of war with France in February 1793, Allanson and Barton were quick to obtain letters of marque for their captains, authorising them to attack and try to capture French vessels.

Allanson and Barton's ship Harriot under Captain Caitcheon in April became the first to send a prize into Liverpool. Agreeable, a "fine Bermuda-built brig... laden with coffee, sugar, indigo, and cotton", was taken on its way from Port-au-Prince to Bordeaux. Thomas and William Barton acquired the ship when it was auctioned by Ewart & Ruston, ship and cargo together having been estimated at between £6,000 and £10,000. Even before this in March Harriot and Speights Town, another Allanson and Barton ship, had re-captured Camilla, which had been taken by a French privateer while sailing from Salonica to London with cotton, sponge, figs and valonia.

In May 1793 another ship, Pilgrim, in which Thomas Barton was a shareholder along with Thomas Birch, captured the 800-ton La Liberté and brought her into Barbados. The ship, sailing from Bombay to Lorient in France, had a particularly fine cargo, including silks and spices, fabrics, china, and mother-of-pearl, which realised £190,000. So valuable was the prize that Barton renamed an estate "Pilgrim" to celebrate, that he had bought in Everton.

Bartons' 1794 ship Barton was also involved in a number of actions, even making a practice of sailing along the French coast for several weeks looking for prey, before sailing on to Barbados. Traffic was not all one-way however, and Barton ships could also be on the receiving end of such attentions. Agreeable was captured in March 1796 on her way to Barbados, but re-captured by a British naval squadron; Harriot was captured off Barbados in 1796, but recaptured by HMS Pelican; while Agreeable was captured again in 1798, but re-captured after Royal Navy ships were sent specifically to regain her.

Following the renewal of hostilities in 1803, the Barton ship Irlam made further captures including Adolphus from Mauritius (1803); the brig Batavia (1809, but taken back by her crew); a French brig carrying sugar (1809); and Nelly (recapture, 1810). Barton ships Maxwell and Tiger also jointly captured three American merchant vessels in 1813 after the American entry into the conflict.

== Slavery ==
Although Liverpool was an important centre for Britain's slave trade, and Barbados an important destination for slave ships, Bartons' primary focus was on the direct West Indies trade, relying on filling their ships with plantation supplies and luxury items for the return leg, for transport straight to the island, rather than voyages via the triangular trade. Pope (2007) identifies Thomas Barton as not "one of the cohort of leading slave merchants of the second half of the eighteenth century" (criterion: those who had financed or part-financed 18 or more voyages), despite having amassed significant property outside the Borough of Liverpool, while Krichtal (2013) classifies the firm as not a "major slave trader" (criterion: a firm which had backed twenty or more voyages).

However, the principals of the firm were not uninvolved. According to Voyages: The Trans-Atlantic Slave Trade Database, Thomas Barton was one of the co-owners of Rose Hill, when she made a voyage in 1784 transporting enslaved people; Nelly, built for and owned by Thomas Barton and John Allanson, made three voyages transporting enslaved people, one in 1784 and two in 1785; four such voyages each were made by Agreeable and Elizabeth while owned by Thomas and William Barton (1794, 1795, 1798, 1800; and 1797, 1798, 1800, and 1801, respectively); and one such voyage was made by Tyrone (in 1802). In all, according to the database, 3264 captives were trafficked by these voyages. Two further vessels the partners later bought (Tiger and Bootle) had also previously transported enslaved people, but not while the partners owned them (which was after Parliament had abolished the trade). Captain John Gillespie (or Gilespy) of Barton, the ship the partners purchased in 1810 and trading between Liverpool and Bridgetown, was involved in 43 transactions involving manumissions of enslaved people in Bridgetown between 1806 and 1818.

Enslaved people were also at the heart of all the Barbados plantations the firm traded with; and which the firm increasingly also lent to, as the 1800s progressed. A steady long-term decline in sugar prices from the 1790s onwards, often accompanied by unavoidable legal charges in the form of legacies, settlements, or annuities from the estates, led to a large proportion of the plantation estates becoming increasingly indebted by the 1820s. Merchants such as Bartons who had previously offered trade finance and managed bills of exchange for estates now increasingly found themselves offering mortgages, secured against plantations and slaves, to enable the proprietors to continue production—and even taking on whole estates themselves, bought either directly or out of the Chancery Court following bankruptcy proceedings, as mortgagees found their debt burdens become unsustainable.

Between 1823 and 1834 Barton, Irlam, and Higginson issued mortgages worth at least £60,500 to at least eleven different estates. In 1823 William Barton bought the Sandy Lane plantation for £19,718, including 106 enslaved people; while by the time of John Higginson's death in 1834 Higginson had become the owner of seven estates (Joe's River, Foul Bay (also known as Grettons), Rowans, Congo Road, Sandy Lane, Cane Garden, and Castle Grant) with the services of 867 "apprentices" (as former slaves, freed by the 1833 Act, but still bound to the estates, became known). Under the Slave Compensation Act 1837 the freeing of these former slaves netted Higginson's estate about £18,500 in government compensation, (enough to buy goods worth about £1.8 million in 2021, or labour worth £16.5m at 2021 prices). Higginson's executor also collected the slave compensation money for some further estates, against which Higginson had judgments for failure to repay their debts. The total, based on compensation for 1,232 enslaved people, made the firm one of the biggest slave-owners on the island.

== Bankruptcy ==
Fiat in Bankruptcy was issued on 13 November 1847 against Jonathan Higginson and Richard Deane of Liverpool carrying on business at Liverpool under the firm of Barton, Irlam and Higginson, and at Barbadoes under the firm of Higginson, Deane & Stott.

Barton, Irlam and Higginson meet with considerable opposition in the Liverpool District Court of Bankruptcy. Reportedly, they had received a large quantity of sugar from Mr Hinds, of Barbadoes, in June 1847, pledged it in July for £20,000, and in August got a further advance of £30,000, at the same time owing Mr Hinds a large balance.

When Barton, Irlam and Higginson failed it had liabilities of £850,119, of which the Royal Bank of Liverpool held £545,791. (The bankruptcy occurred during the great railway panic of 1847 and the Bank suspended operations between 18 October and 1 December. It then operated until it finally failed in 1867. The bank's failure resulted in the failure of the White Star Line.)

The Official Assignee announced in 1851 a dividend of 20s (sic) on the pound. Actually, the dividend amounted to 17s 6d in the pound.

The bankruptcy was still underway in 1870. In 1895 the Official Receiver was still negotiating with Jonathan Higginson's widow Charlotte over stock of the North-Eastern Railway Co. Jonathon, who had died in 1859, had on his own account purchased shares in the Leeds and Thirsk Railway, with which the North-Eastern Railway Company later merged. At the time of the merger the value of the new shares in the merged railway was £3087. However, the railway never paid out the dividends accruing to those shares with the result that by 1895 the shares and accrued dividends were worth about £7000. Charlotte Higginson and the Receiver agreed to divide this amount, with Charlotte getting £3087 plus the last six years of accrued dividends, and the Receiver the remainder.

The accounts of the Assignees were last reported audited in 1897.

== Ships ==
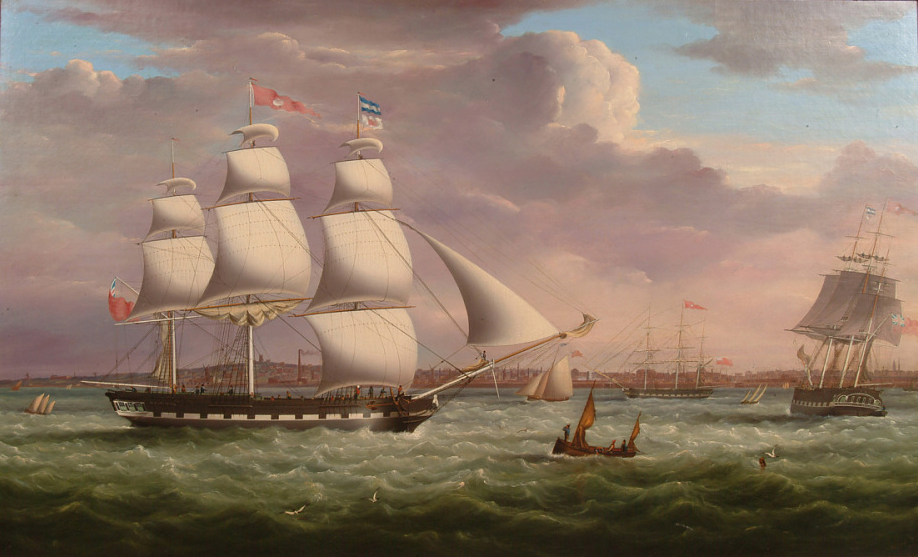
Higginson in Liverpool, 1814

Vessel name	Tons (bm)	Launched	End year	Notes
Barton	212/222	1794	1810	Sold c. 1810. Captured and burnt by USS Syren on 28 May 1814
Barton	440	1810	1836	Wrecked
Bootle	401	1805	1813	Former slave ship; Barton & Co. owned between 1809 and loss in a hurricane
Cicero	429	1796	1802–1803	West Indiaman. Sold.
Higginson	454	1814	1856	Sold in 1848 after the company's bankruptcy in 1847; last listed in 1856
Irlam	380	1800	1812	Wrecked
Irlam	407	1813	1824	Wrecked
Irlam	299	1825	1831	Wrecked in the Great Barbados Hurricane of 1831
Maxwell	326	1798	1814	Launched in America; Higginson owned to 1808, then Barton & Co. until 1813; lost off Borcum on 16 January 1814 while sailing from Liverpool to Bremen.
Tiger	371/386	1800	1819	Launched at Liverpool; Barton & Co.-owned from 1807; lost on 30 September 1819 near the Saltee Islands returning to Liverpool from Barbados. Only four of the 30 crew and passengers aboard survived.
