= Speightstown (disambiguation) =

Speightstown is a community in Barbados.

- Speightstown (horse) – an American racehorse.
- Speights Town (1784 ship) – a ship launched at Liverpool in 1784 and lost in 1784
