= Samuel Leech =

Anglo-American sailor and author

- Born: c. 1798; Wanstead, Essex, England
- Died: 1848 (aged 49–50)
- Military career
- Allegiance: United Kingdom; United States
- Branch: Royal Navy; US Navy
- Service years: 1810–1816
- Rank: Seaman
- Units: HMS Macedonian; USS Syren; USS Boxer
- Conflicts: Napoleonic Wars; War of 1812

Samuel Leech (c. 1798–1848) was a young sailor in the Royal Navy and the United States Navy during the War of 1812. He became notable as one of very few who wrote an account of his experiences, titled, in the manner of the time, Thirty Years from Home, or a Voice from the Main Deck; Being the Experience of Samuel Leech, Who Was Six Years in the British and American Navies: Was Captured in the British Frigate Macedonian: Afterwards Entered the American Navy, and Was Taken in the United States Brig Syren, by the British Ship Medway.

Leech's nautical career began in 1810, at the age of twelve, when Lord William FitzRoy agreed to take Samuel into his frigate HMS Macedonian, as a favour to FitzRoy's sister Frances, the wife of Francis Spencer, 1st Baron Churchill, Leech being the son of one of her servants.

He was a powder monkey during Macedonian's duel with the United States in 1812, and would later vividly describe the carnage on board the British ship before she struck her colours. As a prisoner of war, he was due to be exchanged at some point, but when the captured Macedonian was brought into Newport, Rhode Island, Leech jumped ship.

After failing to gain steady work on land, he returned to the sea, this time signing on to the US Navy, where he compared his treatment favourably to that in the Royal Navy. Leech was serving on the Syren when she was captured by HMS Medway in 1814. His imprisonment seems not to have been too uncomfortable, and did not last long in any case, since the war ended the following year. He was in Boxer subsequently.

Around 1816 he went ashore, where he worked at various jobs and joined the Methodist Church. He eventually accumulated enough money to go into business for himself, and became a merchant living in Wilbraham, Massachusetts with a wife and three children.

Many years later he revisited Macedonian, now a US ship, when it was in port in New York (probably 1840), and reminisced with the sailors there. Perhaps this encounter inspired his book, which was published by Tappen & Dennet in 1843.
