= List of shipwrecks in September 1832 =

The list of shipwrecks in September 1832 includes ships sunk, foundered, grounded, or otherwise lost during September 1832.

== 1 September ==
List of shipwrecks: 1 September 1832
Ship	State	Description
George and Thomas	United Kingdom	The ship was wrecked on Langlade Island. She was on a voyage from Quebec City, Lower Canada, British North America to Dublin.
Margaret	United Kingdom	The ship capsized in the Strait of Malacca off Water Island with some loss of life.

== 5 September ==
List of shipwrecks: 5 September 1832
Ship	State	Description
Friends	United Kingdom	The ship foundered in the Irish Sea off Point Lynas, Cheshire. Her crew were rescued. She was on a voyage from Dundalk, County Louth to Liverpool, Lancashire.

== 6 September ==
List of shipwrecks: 6 September 1832
Ship	State	Description
Brutus	United Kingdom	The brig foundered in Narva Bay.. Her crew survived.
General Victoria	United States	The ship was wrecked at Veracruz, Mexico.
Marys and Allison	United Kingdom	The ship departed from Stockton-on-Tees, County Durham for London. No further trace, presumed foundered in the North Sea with the loss of all hands.

== 7 September ==
List of shipwrecks: 7 September 1832
Ship	State	Description
Cyrene	United Kingdom	The brig was driven ashore and wrecked in Narva Bay.
Emma	United Kingdom	The brig was driven ashore and wrecked in Narva Bay. Her crew survived.

== 8 September ==
List of shipwrecks: 8 September 1832
Ship	State	Description
Lion	United Kingdom	The ship was wrecked in the Solís Grande Creek, Uruguay. She was on a voyage from Liverpool, Lancashire to Rio de Janeiro, Argentina.

== 10 September ==
List of shipwrecks: 10 September 1832
Ship	State	Description
Carnation	United Kingdom	The ship was wrecked on Heneaga, Bahamas.

== 12 September ==
List of shipwrecks: 12 September 1832
Ship	State	Description
Lion	United Kingdom	The brig was driven ashore and wrecked at Montevideo, Uruguay with the loss of two of her crew. She was on a voyage from Liverpool, Lancashire to Buenos Aires, Argentina.

== 13 September ==
List of shipwrecks: 13 September 1832
Ship	State	Description
James and Margaret	United Kingdom	The ship was lost near "Camo". Her crew were rescued. She was on a voyage from New York, United States to Cape Breton Island, Nova Scotia, British North America.

== 15 September ==
List of shipwrecks: 15 September 1832
Ship	State	Description
Esperance	France	The ship was wrecked between Cancale and Saint-Malo, Ille-et-Vilaine.

== 17 September ==
List of shipwrecks: 17 September 1832
Ship	State	Description
Etton	United Kingdom	The ship was wrecked at Ålesund, Norway. Her crew were rescued. She was on a voyage from Saint Petersburg, Russia to Sunderland, County Durham.
Helen	United Kingdom	The ship was wrecked near Havre de Grâce, Seine-Inférieure, France.

== 18 September ==
List of shipwrecks: 18 September 1832
Ship	State	Description
John and Jane	United Kingdom	The ship was wrecked near Bude, Cornwall. Her crew were rescued.

== 19 September ==
List of shipwrecks: 19 September 1832
Ship	State	Description
Juno	United Kingdom	The ship was wrecked on Saaremaa, Russia. She was on a voyage from London to Riga, Russia.

== 21 September ==
List of shipwrecks: 21 September 1832
Ship	State	Description
Amiable Elizabeth	France	The ship foundered in the Atlantic Ocean between La Désirade and Basse-Terre, French West Indies.
Cicero	United Kingdom	The ship ran aground in the River Shannon at Limerick and capsized. She was on a voyage from Limerick to Quebec City, Lower Canada, British North America.
Hope	United Kingdom	The ship ran aground on rocks at "Ostergam", Sweden. She was refloated but capsized. Her crew were rescued. Hope was on a voyage from Saint Petersburg, Russia to Hull, Yorkshire.
Johns	United Kingdom	The ship struck rocks near "Orlogness" and was abandoned by her crew. She was on a voyage from Arkhangelsk, Russia to Hull.
Rebecca	United Kingdom	The ship was wrecked near "Matan". Her crew were rescued. She was on a voyage from the Clyde to Quebec City, Lower Canada, British North America.
Quebec Packet	United Kingdom	The ship was driven ashore and wrecked near Egg Island, Ontario, British North America. Her crew were rescued. She was on a voyage from London to Quebec.

== 22 September ==
List of shipwrecks: 22 September 1832
Ship	State	Description
Hyndman	United Kingdom	The ship was wrecked near Little River with the loss of a crew member. She was on a voyage from London to Demerara via Saint Andrews, New Brunswick, British North America.
Unicorn	United Kingdom	The ship was wrecked in Catteen Bay. All on board were rescued. She was on a voyage from Liverpool, Lancashire to Quebec City, Lower Canada, British North America.

== 23 September ==
List of shipwrecks: 23 September 1832
Ship	State	Description
Vestal	United Kingdom	The ship was driven ashore and wrecked on Malta with the loss of two of her crew. She was on a voyage from "Sancho" to London.

== 24 September ==
List of shipwrecks: 24 September 1832
Ship	State	Description
Carl Alexander	Russia	The ship was lost off Hogland. She was on a voyage from London, United Kingdom to "Wyburg".
Freedom	United Kingdom	The ship was wrecked at Torrevieja, Spain. Her crew were rescued.

== 25 September ==
List of shipwrecks: 25 September 1832
Ship	State	Description
Mentore	Russia	The ship foundered in the Black Sea 30 nautical miles (56 km) from the entrance to the Bosphorus with the loss of all hands. She was on a voyage from Odesa to Trieste.

== 28 September ==
List of shipwrecks: 28 September 1832
Ship	State	Description
Ceres	Netherlands	The ship was wrecked at Arkhangelsk, Russia.

== 29 September ==
List of shipwrecks: 29 September 1832
Ship	State	Description
Karl Alexander	Russia	The ship foundered off Hogland. She was on a voyage from Gloucester, United Kingdom to Vyborg.
Robert Adams	United States	The ship was wrecked in Currituck Sound. She was on a voyage from Madeira, Portugal to Baltimore, Maryland.

== Unknown date ==
List of shipwrecks: Unknown date 1832
Ship	State	Description
Cossack	United Kingdom	The schooner was driven ashore at "Sunlen", Norway before 22 September. Her crew were rescued. She was on a voyage from Arkhangelsk, Russia to Wick, Caithness and London.
Flora	United Kingdom	The barque was driven ashore on Anticosti Island, Lower Canada, British North America. She was on a voyage from Quebec City, Lower Canada to Padstow, Cornwall.
Herman	United Kingdom	The ship was wrecked at Hoylake, Lancashire before 4 September. She was on a voyage from Liverpool, Lancashire to Elsinore, Denmark.
Lezard	France	The ship was wrecked at Senegal.
