= Augustus Brine =

Rear-Admiral Augustus Brine
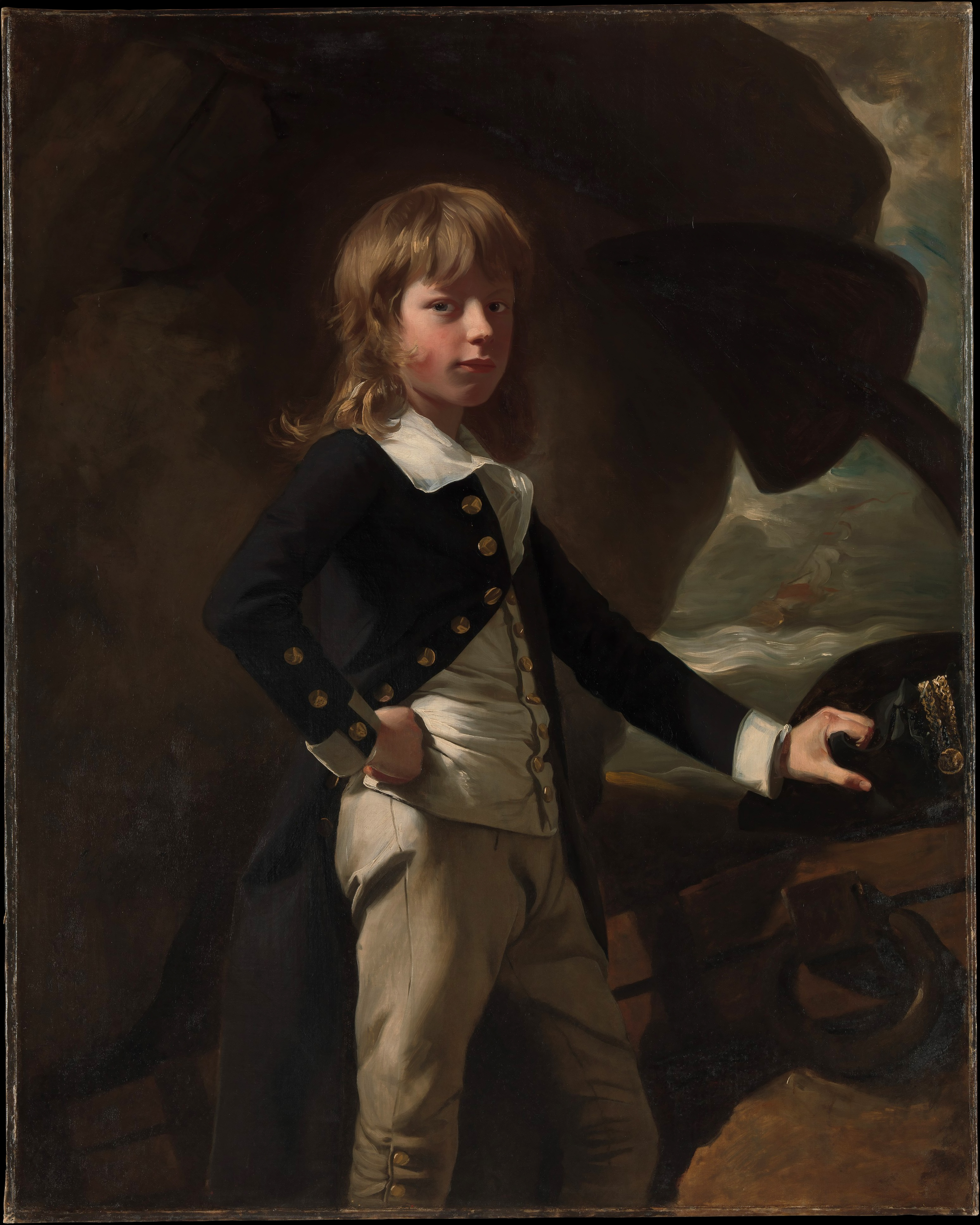
- Augustus Brine as a young midshipman, John Singleton Copley, 1782
- Born: 1769; Blandford St. Mary, Dorset, England, Kingdom of Great Britain
- Died: January 28, 1840 (aged 70–71); Boldre Hill, Hampshire, England, United Kingdom
- Military career
- Allegiance: United Kingdom of Great Britain and Ireland
- Branch: Royal Navy
- Service years: 1782 – 1840
- Rank: Rear-Admiral
- Commands: HMS Hope; HMS Bellerophon; HMS Stirling Castle; HMS Medway
- Conflicts: French Revolutionary Wars; Napoleonic Wars; War of 1812; Capture of USS Syren

Augustus Brine (1769 – 28 January 1840) was an officer of the Royal Navy who served during the American War of Independence and the French Revolutionary and Napoleonic Wars.

Despite being the son of a prominent naval officer of the American War of Independence, Augustus Brine had a relatively quiet career. He rose through the ranks to his first command during the French Revolutionary Wars, and was serving at the Cape of Good Hope by 1798. In 1799 he was faced with rumours of a mutiny while off Madagascar, and took decisive steps to maintain his authority and suppress any attempted insubordination. In doing so he was able to navigate his ship back to a British port and obtain support from other British ships.

He was unable to obtain a seagoing command early in the outbreak of the Napoleonic Wars, but accepted a shore position in charge of a unit of Sea Fencibles. He finally received a ship, the 74-gun HMS Bellerophon, in 1810, and carried out patrols off the Dutch coast until 1813. Other commands followed, including that of a ship sent out to the Cape. While cruising in the Atlantic he discovered the homeward-bound American commerce raider USS Syren, and captured her. Apparently entering retirement after the end of the Napoleonic Wars, he was promoted to rear-admiral shortly before his death in 1840.

== Family and early life ==
Augustus Brine was born into a naval family in 1769, the eldest son of James Brine, who became an admiral and commanded a ship at the Battle of the Chesapeake. Augustus's brother, George, also entered the navy and became a captain. Little is known about his early service, but he entered the navy at the age of thirteen in 1782 and served as a midshipman aboard his father's ship, HMS Belliqueux. His portrait was painted at about this time by John Singleton Copley. He was commissioned a lieutenant on 20 November 1790, and a commander on 6 December 1798. He commissioned the 14-gun sloop HMS Hope that year and commanded her at the Cape of Good Hope until paying her off in February 1800.

== Mutiny threatened ==
While cruising off Madagascar on 8 May 1799 Brine was informed by a member of the crew that some of the sailors were planning to seize control of the sloop, confine the officers, and sail the Hope into a French-controlled port. Brine promptly arrested the supposed ringleaders and began the voyage back to the Cape. By 2 July the danger had still not passed, as Brine was informed that more men were now involved in the plot to mutiny. Brine decided that "if [he] had confined the whole of the ship's company, there would have been great difficulty in working the ship, the officers were therefore divided" into two watches, armed with their servants who kept a constant and good lookout on those still out of confinement. On 15 July he arrested two more ringleaders, and ordered his officers to shoot any man who appeared on deck while his watch was below, and informed his crew that if two men were seen talking together before the main mast during the night, they would be shot. An outbreak of a violent illness amongst the officers and some of the loyal members of the crew on 22 July was attributed to an attempt by the mutineers to poison them. When Hope finally anchored in Simon's Bay on 30 July, Brine brought two companies of marines on board from HMS Oiseau and HMS Camel, and placed the ship's company in confinement.

== Napoleonic Wars ==
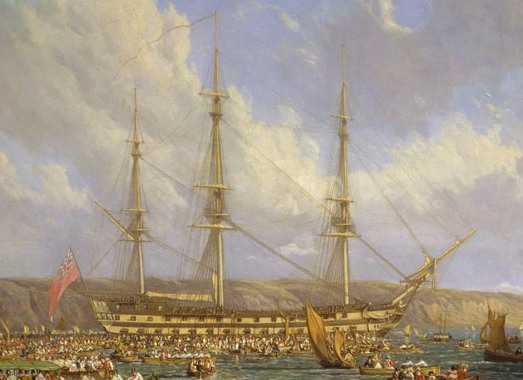
HMS Bellerophon, detail from Scene in Plymouth Sound in August 1815, an 1816 painting by John James Chalon. Brine commanded her on patrols in the North Sea between 1810 and 1813.

Brine was promoted to post-captain on 29 April 1802, but did not receive an active seagoing command for some time. Instead in May 1805 he was given command of a unit of the Sea Fencibles, with responsibilities for the coast between St Alban's Head and Puncknowle. He finally received a ship towards the end of the Napoleonic Wars, taking command of the 74-gun HMS Bellerophon on 5 November 1810. Brine commanded Bellerophon until 10 February 1813, mostly spent on cruises in the North Sea and off the Dutch coast. He then briefly took command of the 74-gun HMS Stirling Castle later in 1813. He was not in command for long, in April 1813 he transferred to the 74-gun HMS Medway and became flag captain to Vice-Admiral Charles Tyler. Brine then took Medway out to the Cape.

Brine sailed from the Cape in mid-1814 to search for American shipping, and while sailing through the Atlantic Medway came across the 16-gun USS Syren, bound for the United States. The Syren mistook the Medway for a large merchant vessel and approached her. On realising his mistake, Syren's commander, Lieutenant N. J. Nicholson, tried to outrun the British warship. After failing to escape and being unable to fight the more powerful vessel, he surrendered his ship to Brine.^{[a]}

== Later life ==
Brine does not appear to have commanded any other ships after paying Medway off after the end of the Napoleonic Wars, but was promoted to rear-admiral in 1837. He died at Boldre Hill, Hampshire, on 28 January 1840 at the age of 70. Brine married Martha-Maria Dansey on 14 May 1803 at Blandford and had one son, Rev. Augustus James Brine (later changing his last name to Knapton) on 26 January 1805. Martha-Maria predeceased Brine, dying at Lymington on 31 December 1831.

== Notes ==
a. The captured Syren was not commissioned into the Royal Navy, but found some employment as a lazaretto from 1815, and was discarded soon afterwards.
