= Irlam (1813 ship) =

West Indiaman wrecked 1824

United Kingdom
- Name: Irlam
- Namesake: George Irlam (Note: George Irlam was a partner in the noted Liverpool firm of Barton, Irlam and Higginson.)
- Owner: Barton & Co.
- Builder: Liverpool
- Launched: 1813
- Fate: Wrecked January 1824

General characteristics
- Tons burthen: 407 (bm)
- Propulsion: Sails
- Sail plan: full-rigged ship
- Armament: 18 × 18-pounder carronades

Irlam was a West Indiaman launched in Liverpool in 1813 for Barton & Co., which had lost an earlier Irlam in 1812. The later Irlam was of the same burthen as her predecessor, and was employed in the same trade, Liverpool to Barbados. She was wrecked in January 1824.

== Career ==
Irlam entered Lloyd's Register in 1813 with Rodger Hall, master, Barton and Company who were the owners, and traded from Liverpool to Barbados. She had entered service by June. The ship was fitted with a "Liverpool Patent Binnacle and Compass" manufactured by Egerton, Smith & Co Ltd, Liverpool.

Departing from Barbados in December 1814 in a convoy of 44 ships escorted by HMS Hazard, HMS Orontes, and HMS Palma, she arrived at Cobh, County Cork on 26 January 1815, after a voyage of 40 days. She was carrying a cargo of coffee and sugar. On 9 December 1816 Irlam, Irlam master, arrived at Liverpool from Barbados. As she was coming up to dock for repairs she struck the pier and her anchor drove through her bows with the result that she ended up with four feet of water in her hold.

Irlam having returned from another voyage from Barbados was driven ashore on 6 July 1817 at Liverpool. In April/May 1819, Irlam sailed from Barbados to Liverpool in 30 days.

=== Loss ===
Irlam under Master Higgins was wrecked on 22 January 1824 on the Blackwater Bank, in the Irish Sea 9 nautical miles (17 km) off the coast of County Wexford. Her passengers and crew were rescued. She was on a voyage from Liverpool to Barbados. The announcement of her loss stated that "should the weather prove favourable, the Ships materials may be saved".

== Post script ==
Barton & Co. promptly proceeded to launch a third Irlam, which sailed on the same route and which met with a similar fate, being wrecked in a hurricane at Barbados on 11 August 1831.
