= List of shipwrecks in September 1831 =

The list of shipwrecks in September 1831 includes ships sunk, foundered, grounded, or otherwise lost during September 1831.

== 1 September ==
List of shipwrecks: 1 September 1831
Ship	State	Description
Ceres	Stettin	The ship was wrecked on Læsø, Denmark. She was on a voyage from Stettin to London, United Kingdom.

== 2 September ==
List of shipwrecks: 2 September 1831
Ship	State	Description
Ambrosia	United Kingdom	The ship was driven ashore and severely damaged at Calais, France. She was on a voyage from Porsgrunn, Telemark, Norway to an English port.
Bonne Madeleine	France	The ship was wrecked at the mouth of the Garonne. She was on a voyage from Senegal to Bordeaux, Gironde.

== 4 September ==
List of shipwrecks: 4 September 1831
Ship	State	Description
Caroline	United Kingdom	The ship was wrecked on Öland, Sweden. Her crew were rescued. She was on a voyage from Stockholm, Sweden to Hull, Yorkshire.
Hampshire	United Kingdom	The ship was wrecked on Götaland, Sweden with the loss of a crew member. She was on a voyage from Saint Petersburg, Russia to London.

== 5 September ==
List of shipwrecks: 5 September 1831
Ship	State	Description
Ann	United Kingdom	The ship foundered in the North Sea off Lowestoft, Suffolk. Her crew were rescued. She was on a voyage from Selby, Yorkshire to London.

== 6 September ==
List of shipwrecks: 6 September 1831
Ship	State	Description
Hero	United Kingdom	The ship was wrecked near Peterhead, Aberdeenshire. All five people on board were rescued. She was on a voyage from Sunderland, County Durham to Dingwall, Ross-shire.

== 8 September ==
List of shipwrecks: 8 September 1831
Ship	State	Description
Jane	United Kingdom	The ship was driven ashore and sank near Rimouski, Quebec City, Lower Canada, British North America. Her crew were rescued. She was on a voyage from Belfast, County Down to Quebec City.

== 9 September ==
List of shipwrecks: 9 September 1831
Ship	State	Description
Juventus	United Kingdom	The ship was wrecked on a reef off Kyleakin, Isle of Skye.
Matchless	United Kingdom	The ship was wrecked on a reef ff the Abaco Islands. She was on a voyage from London to Havana, Cuba.

== 10 September ==
List of shipwrecks: 10 September 1831
Ship	State	Description
James Beachem	United States	The ship was driven ashore and wrecked at Cape Henry, Virginia. All on board were rescued. She was on a voyage from Bremen to New York.
Rodney	United Kingdom	The ship was run down and sunk in the River Medway off Sheerness, Kent by Lucia (United Kingdom) with the loss of one of the four people on board. She was on a voyage from Rochester, Kent to London.
Sefton	United Kingdom	The ship was wrecked on the Haisborough Sands, in the North Sea off the coast of Norfolk. Her crew were rescued.

== 11 September ==
List of shipwrecks: 11 September 1831
Ship	State	Description
Goole	United Kingdom	The ship ran aground in the Humber and capsized with the loss of two of her crew. She was on a voyage from Goole, Yorkshire to London.

== 12 September ==
List of shipwrecks: 12 September 1831
Ship	State	Description
Ellen	United Kingdom	The sloop was wrecked on the North Bank, in Liverpool Bay. She was on a voyage from Preston, Lancashire to Newry, County Armagh. Ellen was later refloated and beached at Egremont, Cumberland.

== 14 September ==
List of shipwrecks: 14 September 1831
Ship	State	Description
Mary Jane	(United Kingdom of Great Britain and Ireland) Saint Lucia	The drogher was driven ashore and wrecked.

== 15 September ==
List of shipwrecks: 15 September 1831
Ship	State	Description
Fortuna	United Kingdom	The ship was wrecked on Eierland, North Holland, Netherlands. She was on a voyage from London to Antwerp, Belgium.

== 18 September ==
List of shipwrecks: 18 September 1831
Ship	State	Description
Delos	United Kingdom	The ship was abandoned in the Atlantic Ocean. Her crew were rescued by Frances Mary (United States. Delos was on a voyage from Liverpool, Lancashire to the Kennebec River, Maine, United States.
William and John	(United Kingdom of Great Britain and Ireland) Saint Kitts	The cutter was wrecked at Barbados.

=== 19 September ===
List of shipwrecks: 19 September 1831
Ship	State	Description
Briton	United Kingdom	The ship foundered in the Atlantic Ocean (46°00′N 34°00′W). Her crew were rescued by Corinthian (United Kingdom. She was on a voyage from Dublin to Miramichi, New Brunswick, British North America.

== 20 September ==
List of shipwrecks: 20 September 1831
Ship	State	Description
Edward	United Kingdom	The ship ran aground on the Bree Bank, in the North Sea and foundered. Her crew were rescued. She was on a voyage from Amsterdam, North Holland, Netherlands to London.
Harriet	(United Kingdom of Great Britain and Ireland) New South Wales	The whaler was wrecked on Jenning's Island. Her crew were rescued.

== 21 September ==
List of shipwrecks: 21 September 1831
Ship	State	Description
Neptune	Prussia	The ship was driven ashore and wrecked near Tobermory, Mull, Argyllshire, United Kingdom. She was on a voyage from Liverpool, Lancashire, United Kingdom to Pillau.

== 23 September ==
List of shipwrecks: 23 September 1831
Ship	State	Description
September	United Kingdom	The ship was wrecked in the River Lune with the loss of all on board, at least six people. She was on a voyage from Dundalk, County Louth to Lancaster, Lancashire.
Two Sisters	United Kingdom	The ship was driven ashore and wrecked at St. John's, Antigua.

== 24 September ==
List of shipwrecks: 24 September 1831
Ship	State	Description
Feniks (Феникс, 'Phoenix')	Imperial Russian Navy	The brig ran aground and was wrecked at Engelsmansbrotten, 3.5 nautical miles (6.5 km) east of Jussarö in the Gulf of Finland. Her 140 crew were rescued. She was on her way to Kronstadt after unsuccessfully searching for Strela (Imperial Russian Navy), disappeared on 20 August.

== 26 September ==
List of shipwrecks: 26 September 1831
Ship	State	Description
Amelia	Bremen	The ship was wrecked at Dragør, Denmark. She was on a voyage from Bremen to Saint Petersburg, Russia.
Pandora	United Kingdom	The ship was driven ashore and wrecked near Kronstadt, Russia.
Peru	United Kingdom	The ship was driven ashore and wrecked at Lytham St. Annes, Lancashire. She was on a voyage from Mobile, Alabama, United States to Liverpool, Lancashire.
Venus	United Kingdom	The ship was driven ashore and wrecked near Kronstadt.

== 27 September ==
List of shipwrecks: 27 September 1831
Ship	State	Description
Canada	United Kingdom	The ship was wrecked on Cape Rosier, Maine, United States. Her crew were rescued.
Intended	(United Kingdom of Great Britain and Ireland)	British North America: The ship was wrecked near Liverpool, Nova Scotia. She was on a voyage from Antigua to Arichat, Nova Scotia.

== 28 September ==
List of shipwrecks: 28 September 1831
Ship	State	Description
Ionia	(United Kingdom of Great Britain and Ireland) New South Wales	The ship was wrecked in the Bass Strait She was on a voyage from Mauritius to Sydney.
Ursula	United States	The ship departed from Smyrna, Ottoman Empire for Boston, Massachusetts. No further trace, presumed foundered with the loss of all hands.

== 29 September ==
List of shipwrecks: 29 September 1831
Ship	State	Description
Eliza	United Kingdom	The ship foundered in the Irish Sea off Waterford. Her crew were rescued. She was on a voyage from Cork to London.

== 30 September ==
List of shipwrecks: 30 September 1831
Ship	State	Description
Ceres	United States	The ship was driven ashore at Gibraltar.
Flora	United Kingdom	The ship was driven ashore and wrecked in Tramore Bay. Her crew survived. She was on a voyage from Cádiz, Spain to Cork.
Success	United Kingdom	The ship was driven ashore and wrecked in Mount's Bay. Her crew were rescued by the Penzance pilot boat. She was on a voyage from Neath, Glamorgan to Looe, Cornwall.

== Unknown date ==
List of shipwrecks: Unknown date 1831
Ship	State	Description
Betsey	United Kingdom	The brig was wrecked on the Gunfleet Sand, in the North Sea off the coast of Essex before 24 September. Her crew were rescued by Aid (United Kingdom.
Hannah	United Kingdom	The ship was wrecked in the Sound of Hoy before 12 September.
John	United Kingdom	The ship departed from Gloucester for Gothenburg, Sweden. No further trace, presumed foundered with the loss of all hands.
Sarah	United Kingdom	The ship was wrecked on the coast of the Courland Governorate. She was on a voyage from London to Riga, Russia.
