= Maxwell (1804 ship) =

History

United States
- Builder: Boston
- Launched: 1798
- Fate: Sold c. 1804

United Kingdom
- Name: Maxwell
- Owner: 1804:Higginson; 1808:Barton & Co.; 1813:Hawker & Co.
- Builder: Boston
- Acquired: 1804 by purchase
- Fate: Wrecked 1814

General characteristics
- Tons burthen: 326 (bm)
- Complement: 25
- Armament: 10 × 9-pounder guns

Maxwell was launched at Boston in 1798. She came into British hands in 1804, as a West Indiaman, trading between Liverpool and Barbados. She wrecked in January 1814.

== Career ==
Maxwell enters Lloyd's Register in 1804, with J. Edwards, master, Higginson, owner, and trade Liverpool–Barbados.

In 1808 or 1809, Barton, Irlam and Higginson acquired Maxwell, and John Irlam became her master. He acquired a letter of marque on 28 March 1809.

Maxwell successfully fought off an attack off Demarara from the American privateer General Armstrong on 29 November 1812, in the course of which John Irlam was seriously wounded. He survived, however, and was presented a silver cup by the Underwriters of Liverpool in gratitude for his successful defence.

On 11 January 1813, Maxwell sailed from Barbados in company with Tiger, which too belonged to Barton & Co. On their way they captured two American vessels that they sent into Barbados: Lavinia, which had been sailing from Cadiz to Savannah, and Rising States, which had been sailing from Salem to St. Jago. Maxwell and Tiger captured a third vessel, Manilla, which had been sailing from the South Seas to America. However a British sloop-of-war took Manilla from them near the Western Isles and sent her into Plymouth. Maxwell arrived at Liverpool and Tiger at Tuskar. Lavinia arrived at Barbados on 29 January. Rising States also reached Barbados. Manilla, M'Clure, master, arrived at Plymouth on 23 February. The British government made a cartel of Rising States and sent her to Providence, Rhode Island, with 180 American prisoners from Barbados and St Bartholomews.

The Register of Shipping for 1814, still shows Irlam as master, though changing to T. Davis, Barton & Co. as owners, and Maxwell's trade as Liverpool−Barbados. Lloyd's Register for 1814, shows her ownership changing to Hawker & Co. The Register of Shipping for 1815, shows her master as Knubley, her owner as Hawker & Co., and her trades as Liverpool–Newfoundland. Lloyd's Register for 1815 still shows her master as T. Davis, but her trade as Liverpool–Havana.

== Fate ==
Maxwell, Knobley, master, was lost off Borcum on 16 January 1814, while sailing from Liverpool to Bremen. The 1815 Register of Shipping has the notation "Lost" by her name.
