= Tiger (1800 ship) =

History

Great Britain
- Name: Tiger
- Owner: 1800:W.Goore; 1805:Caleb, Joseph, and Jacob (jr.) Fletcher; 1807:Barton & Co.
- Builder: Liverpool
- Launched: 1800
- Fate: Wrecked 1819

General characteristics
- Tons burthen: 350, or 371, or 386 (bm)
- Complement: 1806: 45; 1812: 40
- Armament: 1800:10 × 6-pounder guns; 1805:20 × 9-pounder guns + 2 ×18-pounder carronades; 1806:20 × 9-pounder guns; 1812:20 × 9-pounder guns

Tiger was launched at Liverpool in 1800 as a West Indiaman. She made one voyage in 1806-1807 as a Liverpool-based slave ship in the triangular trade in enslaved people. After British participation in the trans-Atlantic enslaving trade ended in 1807, she returned to the West Indies trade. She also captured three American merchant vessels in 1813. She wrecked on 30 September 1819 with loss of life.

== Career ==
Tiger appears in Lloyd's Register in 1800 with M. Hays, master, W. Goore (or Gore), owner, and trade Liverpool–Jamaica. In 1803 T. Oxton replaced Hays as master. In late March 1805 Tiger, Oxton, master, put into Savannah. She had grounded while sailing from Jamaica to Liverpool.

In late 1805 Gore sold Tiger to Fletcher & Co. Her master changed from Oxton to Kneal, and her trade from Liverpool−Jamaica to Liverpool−Africa.

Captain Charles Kneale acquired a letter of marque on 21 April 1806. He sailed from Liverpool on 16 May 1806, bound for the Bight of Biafra and Gulf of Guinea islands. Tiger acquired captives at Bonny and arrived at Montego Bay on 5 December with 389 captives. She left Jamaica on 7 April 1807 and arrived back at Liverpool on 16 July. She had left Liverpool with 50 crew members and she suffered one crew death on the voyage.

On her return Tiger underwent a good repair and Barton & Co. purchased her. Captain William Field Porter became her master and her trade became Liverpool–Barbados.

Tiger and Irlam, also owned by Barton & Co., left Barbados on 12 March 1808 and were reported on 22 April to have arrived at Liverpool.

On 24 July, Tiger, Porter, master, sailed from Barbados and was reported on 6 September to have arrived back at Liverpool.

On 29 November 1811 Captain Porter stood trial at London for having taken on board Tiger at Carlisle Bay, Barbados, two deserters from the Royal Navy and having concealed them when the Navy sent a Lieutenant to look for them. (Apparently he had concealed more than two, but the charges only related to two.) Porter was found guilty and fined £500 and to be held at Newgate for 12 months or until he had paid his fine.

On 11 January 1813, Tiger sailed from Barbados in company with Maxwell, which too belonged to Barton & Co. On their way they captured two American vessels that they sent into Barbados: Lavinia, which had been sailing from Cadiz to Savannah, and Rising States, which had been sailing from Salem to St. Jago. Maxwell and Tiger captured a third vessel, Manilla, which had been sailing from the South Seas to America. However a British sloop-of-war took Manilla from them near the Western Isles and sent her into Plymouth. Maxwell arrived at Liverpool and Tiger at Tuskar. Lavinia arrived at Barbados on 29 January. Rising States also reached Barbados. Manilla, M'Clure, master, arrived at Plymouth on 23 February. The British government made a cartel of Rising States and sent her to Providence, Rhode Island, with 180 American prisoners from Barbados and St Bartholomews.

In 1813 Tiger underwent a large repair. That year her master changed to J. Hull, who sailed her in the Liverpool–Madeira trade. The next year her master changed from Hull to R. Higgin(s), and her trade returned to Liverpool–Barbados.

On 18 April 1816 Tiger grounded at Mockbeggar while setting out for Barbados. She was refloated the next morning and returned to the river. By the 24th Tiger was at 48°50′N 9°44′W and on her way to Barbados.

In 1818 T. Smith replaced Higgins as master of Tiger.

== Fate ==
Tiger, Smith, master, was lost on 30 September 1819 near the Saltee Islands while returning to Liverpool from Barbados. Only four of the 30 crew and passengers aboard survived.

Tiger reportedly struck the Coningbeg Rock (52.06694°N 6.635°W), and then sank about three miles off Rostoonstown Beach, which is about half a mile west of Carnsore Point. (Note: In 1824 a lightship was stationed there after it proved impossible to build a lighthouse. Later, a lightfloat replaced the lightship.) Wreckage came ashore at Rostoonstown beach.
