= Camilla (ship) =

Several vessels have been named Camilla:

== Camilla (1791 ship) ==
- Camilla, of 200 tons (bm), was launched at Leith in 1791. In March 1793, the letters of marque Speights Town and Harriot recaptured Camilla, Dunbar, master. A French privateer of 14 guns had captured Camilla as she was on her way from Salonica to London. Camilla came into Hoylake. Camilla was carrying a cargo of 475 bales of cotton, 25 bales of spunge, 675 boxes of figs, and 12 tons of valonia. The French privateer Citoyen captured her in September 1793, as Camilla was sailing from Quebec to Cadiz.

== Camilla (1792 ship) ==
- Camilla (1792 ship) , of 309, or 30978/94 tons (bm), was launched at Whitby 15 June 1792 by John Barry. However, Camilla does not appear in the most complete listing of vessels built in Whitby. She first appeared in Lloyd's Register in 1794, with Jn. Bone, master and owner. On 30 May 1797 Camilla was sold at Lloyd's Coffee House for a West Indiaman. She was no longer listed in Lloyd's Register in 1797. Although Camilla appears in a listing of ships sailing to India under a license from the British East India Company, there is no supporting evidence from Lloyd's List's ship arrival and departure data.

== Camilla (1794 ship) ==
- Camilla, of 163 tons (bm), was launched in 1794 at Amesbury, Massachusetts. On 3 September 1798, Ebenezer Parsons registered her at Boston, and commissioned her as a private armed ship. During the United States's Quasi War with France, on 5 February 1799, Camilla, Thomas Seward, master, defeated a two French privateers off Lisbon Rocks. Camilla recaptured the brig's prize, a Portuguese brig, which she restored to the master. Then on 26 July, Camilla recaptured off the Elbe the American brig Little John from her French prize crew. By one report Camilla was tried at Paris.

== Camilla (1800 ship) ==
- Camilla (1800 ship) was built in France in 1799 and was captured by the British. The French recaptured her in 1801.

== See also ==
- HMS Camilla – either of two vessels of the British Royal Navy
