= Agreeable (1793 ship) =

Great Britain
- Name: Agreeable
- Launched: 1786, Bermuda
- Fate: Last mention mid-1819

General characteristics
- Tons burthen: Pre-1797: 132, or 146, or 150, or 158, or 160, (bm); Post-1797:223, or 225 (bm)
- Complement: 1793: 30; 1797 (January): 15; 1797 (October): 25; 1799: 25; 1800: 25; 1808: 25
- Armament: 1793: 12 × 4-pounder guns; 1797 (January): 10 × 4-pounder guns + 2 swivel guns; 1797 (October): 12 × 6-pounder guns; 1799: 12 × 99-pounder guns; 1800: 10 × 6-pounder guns; 1808: 16 ± 12&6-pounder guns; 1814: 4 × 9–pounder guns + 4 × 9-pounder carronades

Agreeable was launched at Bermuda in 1786, probably under a different name. French owners acquired her at some point and sailed her as Agréable. In 1793 the British captured her. Subsequently, between 1793 and 1808, she made six voyages as a slave ship, alternating between the triangular trade in enslaved people, and sailing as a regular West Indiaman. French privateers captured her between the second and third voyages, and the third and fourth voyages, but each time the British Royal Navy recaptured her. In the case of the second capture she was in French hands long enough for them to send her out as a privateer. She herself captured an American vessel in 1808 as she was returning to Liverpool from her last enslaving voyage. After the end of British participation in trans-Atlantic enslaving trade, Agreeable traded more widely, particularly to South America. She was condemned at Buenos Aires in 1814 after running aground in the River Plate. She was repaired and continue to sail to Brazil until she returned to Liverpool in June 1819.

== Career ==
1st capture (1793): War with France had just broken out when on 5 April 1793 Harriet, Caithceon, master, became the first privateer from Liverpool to send in to Liverpool a French prize. The prize was Agreeable. P.M.Culler, master, which had been sailing from Port-au-Prince to Bordeaux. Harriet had captured Agreeable on 11 March at 48°30′N 12°30′W. Agreeable, of 150 tons burthen, was carrying a cargo of coffee, sugar, indigo, and cotton, and the report of her capture valued vessel and cargo at £6–9000. The report also gave the name of Harriet's owner as Barton. The auctioneers Ewart & Ruston, of Exchange Alley, sold vessel and cargo.

Thomas and William Barton acquired Agreeable. She entered Lloyd's Register (LR) in 1793.

Year	Master	Owner	Trade	Source
1793	T.Johnston	T.Barton	Liverpool–Africa	LR

1st voyage transporting enslaved people (1793–1794): War with France had commenced a few months earlier leading Captain Thomas Johnson to acquire a letter of marque on 7 June 1793. He sailed from Liverpool on 21 July. Agreeable began her trade on 1 October and acquired captives at Ambriz. She departed Africa on 9 January 1794 and arrived at Barbados on 22 February. She had embarked 263 captives and arrived with 259, for a 2% mortality rate. She left Barbados on 27 March and arrived back at Liverpool on 30 April. She had left Liverpool with 36 crew members and suffered six crew deaths on the voyage.

After the passage of Dolben's Act in 1788, the first British legislation passed to regulate slave shipping, masters received a bonus of £100 for a mortality rate of under 2%; the ship's surgeon received £50. For a mortality rate between two and three per cent, the bonus was halved. There was no bonus if mortality exceeded 3%. (Note: At the time the monthly wage for a captain of an enslaving ship out of Bristol was £5 per month. That said, masters and surgeons received most of their income in the form of "coast commissions", based on the total number of captives they delivered, plus the income of the sale of two (or more) privilege captives.)

2nd voyage transporting enslaved people (1794–1795): Captain Johnston sailed from Liverpool on 31 July 1794. Agreeable arrived in West Africa on 28 October. She sailed for the West Indies on 3 February 1795 and arrived at Barbados on 1 April. She had embarked 261 captives and arrived with 256, for a 2% mortality rate. She arrived back at Liverpool on 13 July. She had left Liverpool with 28 crew members and she suffered no crew deaths on her voyage.

Year	Master	Owner	Trade	Source & notes
1795	T.Johnston; A.M'Callao	T.Barton	Liverpool–Africa	LR; repairs 1795
1796	M'Callan d.Smith	T.Barton	Liverpool–Barbados	LR; repairs 1795
1797	D.Smith; M'Callan; Heard	T.Barton	Liverpool–Barbados	LR; repairs 1795 & 1796; lengthened and almost rebuilt 1797

2nd capture and 1st recapture (1796): In March 1796 Agreeable, M'Curran, master, was on her way to Barbados when a French privateer captured her. Sir John Borlase Warren's squadron recaptured Agreeable on 15 March and sent her into Falmouth, where she arrived on the 23rd.

On 13 January 1797 Captain Archibald McCallum acquired a letter of marque. In March Barton and Agreeable were sailing in company to Barbados when they parted. A Spanish privateer of 16 guns and 120 men came up and attacked Barton. After about 20 minutes the Spaniard veered off, but proceeded to follow Barton all night at a distance of half a mile. Next morning, when Agreeable appeared, the Spaniard came up and engaged the two British merchantmen. The engagement lasted one hour and forty minutes before the Spaniard disengaged, having suffered extensive damage to her sails and rigging. British casualties consisted of two men wounded on Agreeable.

Barton and Agreeable arrived at Barbados together, and returned to Liverpool together.

In 1797, Agreeable was lengthened and rebuilt. Dolben's Act limited the number of enslaved people that British enslaving ships were permitted to transport without penalty, based on a ship's burthen. At a burthen of 150 tons, the cap would have been 250 captives; at a burthen of 223 tons the cap would have been 362 captives.

3rd voyage transporting enslaved people (1797–1798): Captain James Hird acquired a letter of marque on 28 October. Captain Hird sailed from Liverpool on 22 December 1797. In 1797, 104 vessels sailed from England, bound for Africa to acquire and transport enslaved people; 90 of these vessels sailed from Liverpool.

On 30 December, Agreeable was in company with Lovely Lass, Luce, master, when two privateers, one of 22 guns and one of 18 guns, engaged them for four hours before giving up. Agreeable and Lovely Lass were reported "all well" on 14 January 1798 at 44°50′N 9°15′W. Agreeable started acquiring captives at Bonny on 23 February 1798. She left Africa on 18 March and arrived at St Vincent on 2 May, having stopped at Barbados on the way. She had embarked 357 captives and arrived with 342, for a mortality rate of 5%. She left St Vincent on 28 May and arrived at Liverpool on 3 July. She had left Liverpool with 40 crew members and suffered three crew deaths on her voyage.

Year	Master	Owner	Trade	Source
1798	Heard; A.M'Callum	Barton & Co.	Liverpool–Barbados	LR; lengthened and almost rebuilt 1797

3rd capture and 2nd recapture (1798): On 18 September, three days after Agreeable, M'Callan, master, had left Barbados, a schooner privateer of 14 guns and 100 men captured her and took her into Guadeloupe. Agreeable had 13 people killed and 30 wounded.

Agreeable then became a French privateer. Victor Hugues put 210 men onboard her, armed her with eighteen 12-pounder guns, and sent her to cruize off Barbados. The Royal Navy sent HMS Concorde and Amphitrite to try and find her. A Royal Navy sloop-of-war captured Agreeable, "of Guadaloupe (late of Liverpool)", and carried her into Tortola. She arrived at Ramsgate on 11 April 1799.

Year	Master	Owner	Trade	Source
1799	M'Cannell; W.Scott	Barton & Co.	Liverpool–Barbados	LR; lengthened and almost rebuilt 1797, and damages repaired 1799

4th voyage transporting enslaved people (1799–1800): Captain Walter Stott acquired a letter of marque on 2 July 1799. He sailed from Liverpool on 22 July. In 1799, 156 vessels sailed from England, bound for Africa to acquire and transport enslaved people; 134 of these vessels sailed from Liverpool.

Agreeable acquired captives at Bance Island and arrived at Barbados on 10 January 1800 with 349 captives. She arrived back in Liverpool on 24 March. She had left Liverpool with 46 crew members and she suffered nine crew deaths on her voyage.

Year	Master	Owner	Trade	Source & Notes
1801	W.Scott; W.Lewtas	Barton & Co.	Liverpool–Africa	LR; lengthened and almost rebuilt 1797, and damages repaired 1799

Stott then sailed to Barbados and back. Captain William Lewtas acquired a letter of marque on 20 December 1800. He had returned to Liverpool from Barbados in November after a voyage of only 32 days.

Year	Master	Owner	Trade	Source & Notes
1802	W.Lewtas; G.Nauet	Barton & Co.	Liverpool–Africa	LR; lengthened and almost rebuilt 1797, and damages repaired 1799

5th voyage transporting enslaved people (1802–1803): Although the change of masters did not appear in LR, on 6 July 1802 Captain George Hewitt sailed from Liverpool. In 1802, 155 vessels sailed from England, bound for Africa to acquire and transport enslaved people; 122 of these vessels sailed from Liverpool.

Agreeable acquired captives at Bance Island and arrived on 30 June 1803 at St Kitts with 242 captives. She sailed St Kitts on 17 August and arrived in Liverpool on 27 September with William Good as master. (When Agreeable stopped at Trinidad on her way to St Kitts, Hewitt was still her master.) She had left Liverpool with 28 crew members and she suffered two crew deaths on her voyage.

Year	Master	Owner	Trade	Source & Notes
1807	J.Young	Case & Co.	Liverpool–Africa	LR; lengthened and almost rebuilt 1797, damages repaired 1799 and 1805

6th voyage transporting enslaved people (1807–1808): Captain James Young sailed from Liverpool on 1 January 1807. Agreeable acquired captives at the Congo River. She arrived at Trinidad on 21 November with 164 captives, with the principal place of landing being Zion Hill. On her way home Agreeable Younghusband, master, stopped at Tobago. As she was sailing to Liverpool she captured an American brig sailing from Guadeloupe to America. Agreeable took the sloop into St Kitts. Agreeable arrived back at Liverpool on 29 May 1808.

Year	Master	Owner	Trade	Source & Notes
1808	J.Young; T.Bridge	Case & Co.	Liverpool–Africa	LR; lengthened and almost rebuilt 1797, damages repaired 1799 and 1805

== Merchantman ==
Captain Thomas Bridge acquired a letter of marque on 3 August 1808. He sailed to Rio de Janeiro and Montevideo, returning via Cadiz.

Year	Master	Owner	Trade	Source & Notes
1809	T.Bridge; J.Wash	Case & Co.	Liverpool–Montevideo	LR; lengthened and almost rebuilt 1797, damages repaired 1799 and 1805
1809	T.Bridge	Barton & Co.	Liverpool–Africa	Register of Shipping (RS); lengthened and almost rebuilt 1797; damages repaired 1806

In late 1809, four days after sailing from Liverpool, Agreeable encountered a French privateer. Agreeable repelled the privateer after a severe engagement and arrived at Antigua 83 days after leaving Liverpool. She left Antigua on 22 February 1810.

Year	Master	Owner	Trade	Source & Notes
1810	J.Wash; J.Smith	Case & Co.	Liverpool–Trinidad	LR; lengthened and almost rebuilt 1797, sundry good repairs and thorough repair 1809
1812	Smith; Campbell	Case & Co.	Liverpool–Brazil	LR; lengthened and almost rebuilt 1797, sundry good repairs and thorough repair 1809
1813	J.Campbell; J.Garnock	Case & Co.	Liverpool–Brazil	LR; lengthened and almost rebuilt 1797, sundry good repairs and thorough repair 1809
1814	j.Garnock	Case & Co.	Liverpool–Buenos Aires	RS; lengthened and almost rebuilt 1797; repairs 1805, & small repairs 1812 & 1813

There was a report, that proved false, that an American privateer had captured Agreeable off the coast of Africa. Agreeable had sailed to the River Plate. There she had run aground on the Chico Bank in the River Plate and vessels had to be sent out from Buenos Aires to take off her cargo. Agreeable, Garnock, master, arrived in Buenos Aires in late December 1813 having suffered considerable damage from having run aground.

Agreeable was condemned in Buenos Aires after having run aground in the River Plate. Her entry in the Register of Shipping for 1815 carried the annotation "Condemned".

Agreeable was repaired and returned to service. She arrived in Liverpool on 28 March 1815 with Brown, master. She had left Buenos Aires on 21 January.

She reappeared in LR with the information that she was of French origin. She continued to trade with South America. On 16 March 1816 Agreeable arrived in Rio de Janeiro with the cargo from Tiger, Smith, master, of Leith, which had wrecked on Cape St Rock. (Note: Tiger, of 189 tons (bm), had been launched in Scotland in 1800.)

Year	Master	Owner	Trade	Source
1815	Braithwhaite	Hancock	Liverpool–Brazils	LR
1815	Braithwhaite	Hancock	Liverpool–Brazils	RS; lengthened and rebuilt 1797, & small repairs 1815
1818	Braithwaite; T.Watt	Hancock	Liverpool–Brazils	LR
1819	Hutchinson	Hancock	Liverpool–Brazils	LR

== Fate ==
Although the registers continued to carry Agreeable with unchanged data for a number of years, the last mention of her in Lloyd's List's ship arrival and departure data occurred in 1819. Agreeable. Hutchison, master, arrived in Liverpool on 4 June 1819 after having left Paraíba on 13 April.
