= Bootle (1805 ship) =

19th Century British Slave Ship

United Kingdom
- Name: Bootle
- Owner: 1805:Robert Kitchen; 1808:Foderingham; 1809:Barton & Co.
- Builder: Liverpool
- Launched: 1805
- Fate: Wrecked 1813

General characteristics
- Tons burthen: 401 (bm)
- Complement: 1805:40; 1808:45; 1809:30
- Armament: 1805:20 × 9-pounder guns; 1808:20 × 9-pounder guns; 1809:14 × 9-pounder guns

Bootle was launched in 1805 at Liverpool as a slave ship. She made two voyages delivering slaves to the West Indies before her owner sold her. She then became a West Indiaman. In 1811 the Liverpool partnership of Barton, Irlam and Higginson purchased her and sailed her between Liverpool and Barbados. A hurricane at Bridgetown, Barbados wrecked her in 1813.

== Slave ship ==
Bootle entered Lloyd's Register in 1805 with J. Sillars, master, Kitchen, owner, and trade Liverpool–Africa. Captain John Sillars (or Sillers) acquired a letter of marque on 19 October 1805.

First slave voyage: Sillars sailed from Liverpool on 16 November, bound for Africa. Bootle arrived at Kingston, Jamaica on 13 June 1806. She had embarked 367 slaves and she landed 330, for a loss rate of 10.0%. She left Kingston on 22 June 1808, and arrived back at Liverpool on 16 August. She had commenced the voyage with 46 crew members and suffered six crew deaths on the voyage.

Second slave voyage: Sillars sailed from Liverpool on 11 March 1807 and Bootle arrived at Kingston on 1 September. She had embarked 377 slaves and she landed 339. She left Kingston on 7 September, and arrived back at Liverpool on 4 November. She had commenced the voyage with 51 crew members and suffered six crew deaths on the voyage.

== West Indiaman ==
On Bootle's return, Kitchen sold her to Foderingham (or Fotheringham) and her trade become Liverpool–Barbados (or Liverpool–West Indies. Her master was J. Ferguson. He received a letter of marque on 8 November 1808.

On 5 May 1809 Lloyd's List reported that Bootle, Ferguson, master, had arrived at Liverpool. She lad left Barbados on 21 March.

On her return, Bootle was surveyed and W. Barton & Co. purchased her. Her trade remained Liverpool–Barbados, but her master became J. Ford. Captain John Ford acquired a letter of marque on 21 November 1809.

On her way back to Liverpool from Barbados in March 1813, Bootle recaptured Two Brothers. An American privateer had captured Two Brothers as she was sailing from Baltimore to Cadiz and had taken off her master and papers

== Loss ==
A hurricane wrecked Bootle at Bridgetown, Barbados, on 23 July 1813. Bootle, Ford, master, was lost though a portion of her cargo, one hogshead and two tierces of sugar (out of 140), was saved.
