= Cicero (1796 ship) =

British ship

History

Great Britain
- Name: Cicero
- Namesake: Cicero
- Builder: Sunderland
- Launched: 1796
- Fate: Wrecked and condemned 1832

General characteristics
- Tons burthen: 429 (bm)
- Complement: 1798:25; 1799:30; 1800:36
- Armament: 1798:10 × 9-pounder guns; 1799:10 × 9-pounder guns; 1800:18 × 9-pounder guns; 1804:8 × 6-pounder guns; 1808:2 × 6-pounder guns + 8 × 18-pounder carronades

Cicero was launched at Sunderland in 1796 and initially sailed as a West Indiaman. She was briefly captured in 1799 in a single-ship action with a French privateer. Later, she went whale hunting both in the northern whale fishery (1803–1808), and the southern whale fishery (1816–1823). She capsized at Limerick in September 1832 and was condemned there.

== Career ==
Cicero first entered Lloyd's Register (LR) in 1798 with M.May, master, T.Barton, owner, and trade Liverpool–Barbados. Between 1798, and perhaps before, until c.1802, her owners were the Liverpool firm of Barton, Irlam and Higginson.

=== Capture and recapture ===
Captain Matthew May acquired a letter of marque on 15 November 1798. On 22 April 1799 Lloyd's List (LL), reported that as Cicero was on her way to Barbados a French privateer captured her. However, Cicero was retaken.

Cicero had been sailing from Cape Verde when she was captured on 25 February.

Captain John Barry was sailing the USS United States east of Marie-Galante when on 26 February he sighted two ships. He captured Cicero, of Liverpool and 430 tons (bm), put a prize crew on board, and sailed after her captor, the French privateer Democrat, of 12 guns and 100 men. (Note: Démocrate was a privateer known to have been active off Saint-Domingue in January 1797. HMS Amphitrite captured Democrat, of Guadeloupe, and of 12 guns and 80 men, on 31 May 1799 off Martinique after a long chase. Amphitrite then sent her into Barbados.) At nightfall United States had to give up the chase and she rejoined Cicero. Cicero had resisted her initial capture and had many casualties. The American prize master reported that Cicero's master and three men had been killed, and that 26 men were wounded. Her crew had consisted of 35 men and 15 boys. Her cargo consisted of live stock such as oxen, jackasses, and horses, and the prize master estimated that it was worth $30,000, of which one-eighth would accrue to United States as salvage.

In the 36 or so hours since her capture her French captors had left Cicero's dead and wounded unattended. Barry took the wounded into United States's sick bay and put the 33-man French prize crew into her hold as prisoners. United States then sailed south to Saint-Pierre, Martinique, where Cicero was libelled. (Note: Démocrate also captured Maria, another merchantmen that United States also recaptured and took into Martinique. Maria had been sailing from Glasgow to Martinique when Démocrate had captured her.)

Captain James Burton sailed her home. He acquired a letter of marque on 2 August 1799. LR (1799) showed her master changing from May to James Burne.

Year	Master	Owner	Trade	Source
1801	R.Hall; J. Crosbie	T.Barton; Irlam	Liverpool–Barbados; Liverpool–Demerara	LR

Captain John Crosbie acquired a letter of marque on 25 February 1800. In 1801 there is a report of her sailing in company with Barton (another Barton, Irlam and Higginson ship) from Demerara to Liverpool and passing Barbados on 18 May.

=== Greenland whaler ===
In 1802–1803 her owners sold Cicero and she then spent about five years as a Greenland whaler.

Year	Master	Owner	Trade	Source
1803	J.Crosbie; J.Haskyne	Irlam; Molyneaux	Liverpool–Demerara; Liverpool–Greenland	
1804	J.Haskyne; S.Selkirk	Molyneaux	Liverpool–Greenland	LR

While Haskayne was Cicero's master, he sailed her from Narva to Liverpool. A letter from Elsinor dated 25 October 1803 reported that she had gone onshore at Saltholm. The next report was that she had gone onshore at Dragoe, but that she had been gotten off.

Year	Master	Where	Whales	Tuns whale oil
1803	Haskayne	Greenland	5	78
1804	Selkirk	Greenland	13	102
1805	Selkirk	Davis Strait	1	36.5
1806		Greenland	6	68

Year	Master	Owner	Trade	Source
1807	S.Selkirk; J.Kelly	Molyneaux	Liverpool–Greenland	LR
1808	J.Kelly; Drysdale	Scougl & Co.	Liverpool–Pictou; Leith transport	LR
1812	Drysdale; Steadman	Scougal & Co/	Leith transport	LR
1813	Steadman	Scougal & Co.	London transport	LR
1816	Steadman; R.Plunkett	Stead & Co.	London transport	LR
1817				Not available online

=== Southern whale fishery ===
Between 1816 and 1823, Cicero made three whaling voyages to the British Southern Whale Fishery for Gale & Co.

1st whaling voyage (1816–1818): Captain Taylor sailed in 1816. He returned to Britain on 13 July 1818 with 500 casks of whale oil, and fins.

2nd whaling voyage (1818–1820): Captain Brown sailed from Britain on 24 August 1818. Cicero put into Delagoa Bay in 1820 to effect repairs, and returned to Britain on 24 March 1820. She was under the command of Captain Kelly when she returned. She underwent a large repair in 1820.

3rd whaling voyage (1820–1823): Captain Baxter sailed on 29 June 1820. Captain Clarke returned Cicero to Britain on 12 August 1823 with 420 casks of whale oil.

Year	Master	Owner	Trade	Source & notes
1823	Baxter; Plunket	Gale & Co.	London–South Seas; London–Honduras	LR; large repair 1820 & small repair 1823
1825	Plunket; Friend	Gale & Co.	London–Sierra Leone; London–Quebec	Register of Shipping (RS); large repair 1820, small repair 1823, & damages repaired 1824

Captain Friend sailed from London on 8 July 1825 and arrived at Quebec on 4 September, with passengers.

Year	Master	Owner	Trade	Source & notes
1830	Robinson	J.Scott	Bristol–New Brunswick	LR; though repair 1827 & small repair 1829
1833	Evans	Scott	Bristol–Quebec	RS; good repair 1825, thorough repair 1827, & good repair 1831

== Fate ==
Cicero, Evans, master, ran aground in the River Shannon at Limerick on 21 September 1832 and capsized. She was on a voyage from Limerick to Quebec City. She was condemned at Limerick.
