= Barton (1810 ship) =

British merchant ship 1810–1836

United Kingdom
- Name: Barton
- Owner: Barton & Co.
- Builder: Liverpool
- Launched: 1810
- Fate: Wrecked 1836

General characteristics
- Tons burthen: 410, or 425 (bm)
- Complement: 1810:30; 1813:40
- Armament: 1809: 14 × 12-pounder guns; 1811: 14 × 12-pounder guns

Barton was launched at Liverpool in 1810 as a West Indiaman, trading primarily between Liverpool and Barbados. Her owners, Barton, Irlam and Higginson, had just sold another Barton and their new vessel was almost twice the size of her predecessor. One of her captains was involved in the manumission of over 40 slaves at Barbados. She was wrecked at Charleston, South Carolina, in December 1836.

== Career ==
Barton entered Lloyd's Register in 1810 with W. Lewtas, master, Barton & Co., owners, and trade London–Barbados. Captain William Lewtas acquired a letter of marque on 24 May 1810.

Captain John Gillespy acquired a letter of marque on 1 March 1813. Lloyd's List reported on 25 May 1813 that Ann, which Barton had detained as Ann was sailing from Baltimore to Lisbon, had arrived at Liverpool on 20 May. Barton, Gillespie, master, was at St Thomas on 8 November and was expected to sail that day in a convoy for England under escort by HMS Marlborough.

Captain John Gillespie (or Gilespy) of the ship Barton, trading between Liverpool and Bridgetown, was involved in 43 transactions involving manumissions of slaves in Bridgetown between 1806 and 1818.

In November 1812, the American privateer General Armstrong captured Lucy & Alida, Denmys, master. Barton, "of Liverpool", recaptured Lucy & Alida, but then the American privateer Revenge recaptured her and sent her to Norfolk, Virginia.

| Year | Master | Owner | Trade | Source & notes |
|---|---|---|---|---|
| 1815 | Gillespie | Barton & Co. | Liverpool–Barbados | Register of Shipping (RS) |
| 1820 | Gillespy | Barton & Co. | Liverpool–Barbados | RS |
| 1825 | R. Banks | Barton & Co. | Liverpool–Barbados | RS |
| 1830 | J.Dixon; Armstrong | Barton & Co. | Liverpool–Barbados | RS; thorough repair 1825; partial repair 1828 |
| 1835 | Armstrong | | | Lloyd's Register |

On 10 April 1824, Barton, Banks, master, was at 45°N 27°W when she came upon the hull of a vessel with the name Cumberland on her stern, painted with a yellow streak and with yellow molding underneath. Cumberland had lost all her masts, head, bowsprit, and rudder. She appeared recently coppered and light.

== Fate ==
Lloyd's List reported on 23 October 1835 that Barton, Anwyl, master, had put back to Liverpool, leaky.

Barton, Anwyl, master, sailed from Barbados on 4 November, in ballast, and bound for Charleston, South Carolina. On 17 December 1836 at 7:30pm she struck on St. Helena Breakers, off Charleston. She was stuck and by 2am she had bilged, filled with water, and her stern had dropped off. Captain Anwyl and his crew took to her long boat. However, a strong north-west gale prevented them from reaching shore. At 1:30pm the next day the sloop Two Brothers happened to sail by and she rescued the men. All that they had been able to save from the wreck was their clothes, and 48,000 dollars in gold.
