= Lovely Lass (1788 ship) =

Slave ship

History

Great Britain
- Name: Lovely Lass
- Owner: 1788: James Jones (Note: In the period 1789–1791, Bristol's enslaving trade was highly concentrated in the hands of a small number of firms. It was much more concentrated than the smaller trade in London, or the larger trade in Liverpool. James Jones dominated the trade out of Bristol, with about 26% of the tonnage employed. His brother Thomas accounted for about 14%. The top four firms accounted for 93.2%.); 1797: Thomas Parr
- Launched: 1780, France
- Acquired: 1788
- Fate: Foundered 1798

General characteristics
- Tons burthen: 1789:280, or 282 (bm); 1785:306 (bm)
- Armament: 18 × 6-pounder guns

Lovely Lass was launched in France in 1780, almost surely under another name. She first appeared in British records in 1788. She made three voyages as a Bristol-based slave ship in the triangular trade in enslaved people. She then briefly became a West Indiaman before she became a Liverpool-based enslaving ship. She was lost in 1798 on her first voyage from Liverpool to gather captives.

== Career ==
Lovely Lass first appeared in Lloyd's Register (LR) in the 1789 issue, the 1788 issue being unavailable online.

Year	Master	Owner	Trade	Source & notes
1789	B____; Jenkins	Jones & Co.	Bristol–Africa	LR; new deck and raised 1788

1st enslaving voyage (1788–1789): Captain John Kennedy was listed as master on the sailing pass and at entry outbound; however, Captain William Jenkins appeared on the muster roll. Lovely Lass sailed from Bristol on 27 May 1788, bound for the Gold Coast. Lovely Lass acquired captives on the Gold Coast and at Anomabu. She arrived at Jamaica on 15 May 1789. She had embarked 408 captives and arrived with 398, or 394. Lovely Lass was reported to have taken on captives at St Vincent for Polly, Spellen, master, which had stopped there in distress as Polly was on her way to Barbados from Africa; Lovely Lass delivered Polly's captives to Barbados. Lovely Lass had left Bristol 48 crew members and engaged six more she arrived at Jamaica. She arrived at Jamaica with 30. There she discharged 15 crew members but engaged five more, making her crew 20 for the voyage home. Lovely Lass sailed from Jamaica on 25 June and arrived back at Bristol on 25 August.

The voyage took place under the provisions of Dolben's Act, the first British measure to regulate the enslaving trade. It placed restrictions, based on a vessel's burthen, on the number of captives the vessel was allowed to carry without penalty. In 1788–1789, James Jones, Lovely Lass's owner, had nine enslaving vessels at sea or on the coast of Africa. He estimated that the Act reduced the number of captives his vessels were allowed to carry by a number equivalent to 23% of the pre-Act total. For Lovely Lass, the estimate was a reduction of 134 captives, from 550 to 416, or 24%.

2nd enslaving voyage (1789–1791): The pass named Captain Richard Rogers as master, and he was still master while she was loading before leaving Bristol. However, the muster roll gave the name of the master as Thomas Grimes. Lovely Lass sailed from Bristol on 21 November 1789, bound for the Gold Coast. Lovely Lass started acquiring captives on 25 January 1790 at Tantumquerry and then at Anomabu. She sailed from Africa on 15 February 1791 and arrived at Jamaica on 6 April. Various accounts put the number of captives embarked as 350, 377, or 380 captives, and arrived with 368. She had left Bristol with 42 crew members and engaged six more in Africa. She arrived at Jamaica with 34 and discharged nine there and at St Vincent; she arrived back at Bristol with 25 crew members. Lovely Lass arrived back at Bristol on 19 May.

3rd enslaving voyage (1792–1794): Captain John Wade Robinson sailed from Bristol on 3 January 1792, bound for West Africa. Lovely Lass started acquiring captives on 7 April at Cape Lahou. She then acquired some more at Anomabu. Her principal place for acquiring captives was Cape Coast Castle. She sailed from Africa on 22 November 1793. She arrived at Kingston, Jamaica on 9 January 1794. She had embarked 416 captives and she arrived at Kingston with 413. However, other sources report that she had acquired 738 slaves between Cape Lahou and Cape Coast Castle. One died on the coast and 310 were transshipped before she left with 316. Yet another report has Lively Lass taking on 416 captives at Apollonia and losing five on her voyage from Africa to Jamaica. Lively Lass left Bristol with 39 crew members and she engaged 14 more on the African coast; she had 26 when she arrived at Kingston. There she discharged 18. She apparently stopped at San Domingo before returning to Bristol; she engaged 26 crew members at Jamaica and possibly San Domingo. Lovely Lass sailed from Kingston on 10 May and arrived at London on 29 July.

Year	Master	Owner	Trade	Source & notes
1795	J.R.Wade; Rydell	Jones & Co.	Bristol–Africa; Liverpool–Barbados	LR; almost rebuilt 1795
1797	R.Rydell; W. Lace	J.Dawson & Co.	Liverpool–Barbados; Liverpool–Africa	LR; almost rebuilt 1795
1798	W.Lace	T.Parr & Co.	Liverpool–Africa	LR; almost rebuilt 1795, & damages repaired 1797

4th enslaving voyage (1797–loss): Captain William Lace sailed from Liverpool on 21 December 1797, bound for West Africa. On 30 December Lovely Lass was in company with Agreeable, Hird, master, when two privateers, one of 22 guns and one of 18 guns, engaged them for four hours before giving up. Agreeable and Lovely Lass were reported "all well" on 14 January 1798 at 44°50′N 9°15′W.

== Loss ==
Lovely Lass was reported to have foundered off Cape Lopez, Africa. She had not embarked any captives.

In 1798, 25 British enslaving vessels were lost. In 1798, 160 vessels sailed from British ports on enslaving voyages, giving a loss rate for that year of about 16%. Twelve vessels were lost on the coast of Africa. During the period 1793 to 1807, war, rather than maritime hazards or resistance by the captives, was the greatest cause of vessel losses among British slave vessels.

It is highly possible that the French had captured Lovely Lass, or that her crew was rescued. A biography of notable people from the Isle of Man reports the engagement of 30 December 1797, and then goes on to report that William Lace captured many prizes before a French fleet captured him. He was taken to France, from where he escaped, and had other adventures before he died in 1850.
