= Speights Town (1784 ship) =

British merchant ship (1784–1794)

History

Great Britain
- Name: Speights Town
- Namesake: Speightstown
- Launched: 1784, Liverpool
- Fate: Wrecked, December 1794

General characteristics
- Tons burthen: 175, or 240, or 250Mis-transcribed as Sprightstown. (bm)
- Length: 77 ft 5 in (23.6 m)
- Beam: 23 ft 5 in (7.1 m)
- Complement: 50
- Armament: 16 × 6-pounder guns
- Notes: Two decks & three masts

Speights Town (or Speightstown), was launched at Liverpool in 1784 as a West Indiaman, sailing between Liverpool and Barbados. She was wrecked in late 1794.

== Career ==
Speights Town was registered in 1784 by John Allanson of Liverpool, Thomas Barton of Liverpool, and William Barton of Barbados. Thomas and William Barton later bought out Allanson and assumed full ownership on 5 May 1792.

She first appeared in Lloyd's Register (LR) in the volume for 1786:

Year	Master	Owner	Trade	Source
1786	J.Jackson	Barton & Co.	Liverpool–Barbados	LR

In March 1786 Lloyd's List reported that Speightstown, Jackson, master, and Susannah, Byrne, master, were transshipping to Leverpool the cargo of Africa, Ash, master, which had been condemned at Barbados. (Note: Africa, the former Dick, of 250 tons (bm), had been launched at Liverpool in 1771. Although LR gave her trade as Liverpool–Africa, she does not appear in the Trans-Atlantic Slave Trade database. Her entry in LR in 1786 bears the annotation "Condemned".)

Year	Master	Owner	Trade	Source
1790	J.Jackson; R.Hall	Allanson	Liverpool–New York City	LR

Richard Hall was appointed master on 15 November 1790. Captain Richard Hall acquired a letter of marque on 28 February 1793, essentially immediately after the outbreak of war with France.

Lloyd's List reported in March 1793 that the letters of marque Speightstown and Harriot had recaptured Camilla, Dunbar, master. A French privateer of 14 guns had captured Camilla as she was on her way from Salonica to London. Camilla came into Hoylake.

Year	Master	Owner	Trade	Source
1793	R.Hall	Allanson	Liverpool–New York City	LR

William Rimmer was appointed master on 10 March 1793.

On 20 February 1794 the Bartons sold Speights Town to John Christian Hartwig Garbers.

== Loss ==
Speightstown, Remmer, master, was wrecked in the Orkney Islands while returning to Liverpool from the Baltic. Her crew were rescued.
