= Barton (1794 ship) =

History

Great Britain
- Name: Barton
- Launched: 1794, Liverpool
- Fate: Captured 1814

General characteristics
- Tons burthen: 212, or 222 (bm)
- Complement: 1794:30; 1798:36; 1800:36; 1803:35; 1806:40; 1809:20; 1811:16
- Armament: 1794: 14 × 6-pounder guns + 2 swivel guns; 1798: 14 × 6-pounder guns; 1800: 18 × 9&6-pounder guns; 1803: 16 × 6-pounder guns; 1806: 18 × 6-pounder guns; 1809: 12 × 6-pounder guns; 1811: 8 × 6&12-pounder guns

Barton was launched in 1794 as a West Indiaman, sailing primarily to Barbados. She was of average size for vessels launched at Liverpool at that time. She sailed under letters of marque and several times repelled attacks by French and Spanish privateers in single-ship actions. The United States Navy captured and burnt her in 1814.

== Career ==
Barton entered Lloyd's Register as Barten in 1799 with Rd Hall, master, Barten & Co, owner, and trade Liverpool–Barbados. The next volume of Lloyd's Register corrected her name and that of her owner, Barton & Co.

Captain Richard Hall acquired a letter of marque on 7 April 1794. At some point he recaptured the brig Mentor, of Aberdeen, which had been sailing from Lisbon with fruit when originally captured.

In March 1797 Barton and Agreeable were sailing in company to Barbados when they parted. A Spanish privateer of 16 guns and 120 men came up and attacked Barton. After about 20 minutes the Spaniard veered off, but proceeded to follow Barton all night at a distance of half a mile. Next morning, when Agreeable appeared, the Spaniard came up and engaged the two British merchantmen. The engagement lasted one hour and forty minutes before the Spaniard disengaged, having suffered extensive damage to her sails and rigging. British casualties consisted of two men wounded on Agreeable.

Captain William Cutler acquired a letter of marque on 20 September 1798. A letter dated Barbados, 1 December 1799, reported that on 25 November Barton was about 20 leagues to windward of Barbados when an unknown vessel came up and shadowed Barton all night, despite Barton maintaining a regular fire from her stern chase guns. In the morning the vessel came up, showing herself to be a French privateer schooner of eighteen 6- and 9-pounder guns. A 2 1/2-hour running engagement ensued. The privateer withdrew to repair her rigging and then recommenced the attack and ran into Barton with the intent of boarding her. Cutler, who had massed his crew and passengers on the quarterdeck, led the counter-attack. The British reported that they had speared many Frenchmen in Barton's netting and shrouds, and that Barton's cabin guns, which continued to fire, had caused casualties on the privateer's deck. The privateer, having sustained casualties in the unsuccessful attempt to board, and much damage to her rigging, broke off the attack. Barton had sustained four casualties: her mate and three seamen wounded. (Note: This account was reprinted verbatim in a number of publications.) Captain Cutler acquired a new letter of marque on 25 February 1800.

Captain George Chalmers acquired a letter of marque on 11 June 1803. Chalmers was 23 years old when he became master. When Barton sailed from Liverpool the practice was to sail in the Channel and along the French coast for some six weeks looking for possible prey, before then sailing on to Barbados. He reports three engagements with French privateers.

On 17 May 1806, as Barton was returning to Liverpool from Barbados, she encountered a French privateer of 20 guns and 50 men, but apparently nothing much transpired. On 23 May Barton fell in with a French privateer of 10 guns that attempted to board, but clearly was unsuccessful. Then on 25 May Barton encountered the French privateer Fairey, of 20 guns and 150 men. For an hour Fairey ranged 50 yards alongside, firing broadsides to which Barton's crew responded only with small arms fire though her guns were loaded. When Fairey finally come alongside to board, Barton's crew fired her guns; they also cut down the French men attempting to board. Fairey sheared off, having sustained heavy casualties and damage to her rigging. (Note: George Chalmers died of consumption (tuberculosis) on 16 December 1806, in Scotland.)

Captain John Ford acquired a letter of marque on 13 June 1806.

The Register of Shipping for 1810 showed Barton with J. Ford, master, changing to R. Burns, Irlam & Co. owners, changing to Taylor & Co., and trade London–Demerara. (Barton, Irlam and Higginson acquired a new Barton that was twice the size of the one they had just sold.)

Captain Robert Burn acquired a letter of marque on 14 November 1809.

Captain James Hasler acquired a letter of marque on 31 December 1811.

The Register of Shipping for 1813 showed Barton with J. Hasler, master, Taylor & Co., owners, changing to Clare & Co., and trade Liverpool–Rio de Janeiro, changing to Liverpool–Africa. Lloyd's Register for 1814 confirms the change of ownership and trade.

== Fate ==
USS Syren captured and burnt Barton, Hassler, master, on 28 May 1814. Barton was carrying a cargo of redwood, palm oil and ivory to St Thomas, Danish Virgin Islands. Syren took on board both Barton's crew and as much of her cargo as Captain Nicholson of Syren desired. The Americans then set her on fire. They delivered her crew to St Thomas, from where the crew went on Jane, of Liverpool. Three crew members from Barton joined the Americans, a Portuguese and two "coloured men". (Note: This account too appeared verbatim in a number of books.)

Jane, Andersen, master, arrived at Liverpool in August 1814. She had sailed via Africa, which she had left on 6 June. Also, Syren had blockaded her at St Thomas for four weeks.
