= Harriot (1786 ship) =

British merchant and slave ship 1786–1814

History

Great Britain
- Name: Harriot
- Launched: 1786, Liverpool
- Fate: Last listed in 1814

General characteristics
- Tons burthen: 1786:140, or 160 (pre-1792) (bm); 1792:176, or 187, or 188, or 250 (bm)
- Length: 72 ft 0 in (21.9 m)
- Beam: 22 ft 1 in (6.7 m)
- Complement: 1793: 31; 1798: 20; 1808: 28
- Armament: 1793:18 × 6&4-pounder guns + 2 howitzers + 8 swivel guns; 1797:20 × 4-pounder guns; 1798:14 × 4&6-pounder guns; 1799:16 × 6-pounder guns; 1808:14 × 6&9-pounder guns

Harriot (or Harriott)was launched in Liverpool in 1786. For many years she was a West Indiaman, sailing between Liverpool and Barbados. In 1796 a French frigate captured her, but the British Royal Navy quickly recaptured her. She became a slave ship in the triangular trade in enslaved people. At the beginning of her first slave trading voyage a French privateer captured her, and again the Royal Navy quickly recaptured her. She made five slave trading voyages in all. Thereafter she traded with South America. She was last listed in 1814 with stale data.

== Career ==
Harriot first appeared in Lloyd's Register (LR) in 1789.

Year	Master	Owner	Trade	Source & notes
1789	W.Hill	Alanson	Liverpool–Barbados	LR
1793	"Caithcn" [Caitcheon] (Note: Robert Hunter Caitcheon would also be captain of Dominica Packet, and Cam's Delight.)	Allanson	Liverpool–Barbados	LR

On 28 February 1793, Captain Robert Hunter Caitcheon acquired a letter of marque. War with France had just broken out and from her armament, though not from the size of her crew, it appears that Harriet was prepared to take prizes should the opportunity to do so occur.

On 11 March, Harriet and Speightown, Hall, master, recaptured Camilla, Dunbar, master, of Leith. A French privateer of 14 guns and 75 men had captured Camilla as she was sailing from Salonica to London. Camilla was carrying a cargo of 475 bales of cotton, 25 bales of spunge, 675 boxes of figs, and 12 tons of valonia. (Note: Sprightstown, Hall, master, of 250 tons burthen, was clearly a privateer. She was armed with sixteen 6-pounder guns and had a crew of 50. Captain Richard Hall had received a letter of marque on 28 February 1793.)

On 5 April, Harriet became the first privateer from Liverpool to send in to Liverpool a French prize. The prize was the brig Agreeable, P.M.Culler, master, which had been sailing from Port-au-Prince to Bordeaux. Harriet had captured her on 11 March at 48°30′N 12°30′W. Agreeable, of 150 tons burthen, was carrying a cargo of coffee, sugar, indigo, and cotton, and the report of her capture valued vessel and cargo at £6–9000. The report also gave the name of Harriet's owner as Barton. The auctioneers Ewart & Ruston, of Exchange Alley, sold vessel and cargo.

On her next voyage, Harriet chased a French Guineaman (slave ship) into Martinique but had to give up the chase when fired upon by the fort there.

Year	Master	Owner	Trade	Source & notes
1795	"Caithcn"	Allanson	Liverpool–Barbados	LR; lengthened 1792
1797	"Caithcn"; M.May	Barton & Co.	Liverpool–Barbados	LR; lengthened 1792 & repaired 1796

In 1796, Harriot was to windward of Barbados when a French frigate captured her as Harriot was sailing to Barbados from Liverpool. HMS Pelican recaptured her, and sent her into Martinique.

Year	Master	Owner	Trade	Source & notes
1798	M.May; W.Lace	Barton & Co.	Liverpool–Barbados; Liverpool–Africa	LR; lengthened & repairs 1796

A report in 1798 stated that Harriet had made 33 voyages to Barbados in the previous ten years, had taken and retaken several vessels, and had been lengthened in that time, "an instance of commercial expedition,... scarcely to be paralleled."

1st voyage transporting enslaved people (1798–1799): Captain William Lace acquired a letter of marque on 24 September 1798. On 29 October, Captain Lace sailed from Liverpool, bound for the coast of what is now Angola. In 1798, 160 ships sailed from British ports bound for Africa to engage in acquiring and transporting enslaved people; 149 of these vessels sailed from Liverpool.

Harriot acquired captives at Ambriz and arrived at Barbados on 12 July 1799 with 313 captives. She sailed from Barbados on 24 July and arrived back at Liverpool on 3 September. She had left with 36 crew members and suffered two crew deaths on her voyage.

Year	Master	Owner	Trade	Source & notes
1799	M.May; Davidson	Clark & Co.	Liverpool–Africa	LR; lengthened 1792 & repairs 1796
1800	Davidson	Clark & Co.	Liverpool–Africa	LR; lengthened 1792 & repairs 1796

2nd voyage transporting enslaved people (1799–1801): Captain Matthew Cusack sailed from Liverpool on 15 November 1799. In 1799, 156 ships sailed from British ports bound for Africa to engage in acquiring and transporting enslaved people; 134 of these vessels sailed from Liverpool.

Shortly after Cusack set out, a French privateer captured Harriot. A British Royal Navy frigate recaptured Harriot on 3 December, and Harriot came into Cork. (Note: News reports gave the name of the British frigate as Amethyst. A prize money announcement in the London Gazette gave the captor as HMS Beaulieu. At the time the two frigates were sailing in company and jointly recaptured several vessels.) Later, Cusack and Harriot returned to their voyage. In late 1800, Harriot and Trident recaptured Jane, Owen, master, which had been captured as Jane was sailing from Liverpool to Africa. Her recaptors sent Jane back to Liverpool.

Harriot acquired captives in the Sierra Leone estuary. She stopped at St Thomas and arrived in the Bahamas in May 1801. She sold her captives there. From the Bahamas she sailed to Charleston. Harriot, Cusack, master, returned to Liverpool from Charleston on 20 July.

Year	Master	Owner	Trade	Source
1801	Davidson; J.Flinn	M'Dowall	Liverpool–Sierra Leone	LR; lengthened 1792 & repairs 1796

3rd voyage transporting enslaved people (1801–1802): Captain John Flinn sailed from Liverpool on 11 November 1801. In 1801, 147 ships sailed from British ports bound for Africa to engage in acquiring and transporting enslaved people; 122 of these vessels sailed from Liverpool.

Harriet acquired captives at the Gambia and arrived at Trinidad on 13 April 1802 with 206 captives. She sailed from Trinidad on 20 June and arrived back at Liverpool on 21 August. She had left Liverpool with 34 crew members and she suffered six crew death on her voyage.

Year	Master	Owner	Trade	Source
1801	Davidson; R.Everret	M'Dowall	Liverpool–Sierra Leone	LR; lengthened 1792 & repairs 1796

4th voyage transporting enslaved people (1802–1804): Captain Richard Everett sailed from Liverpool on 3 October 1802. In 1802, 155 ships sailed from British ports bound for Africa to engage in acquiring and transporting enslaved people; 122 of these vessels sailed from Liverpool.

Harriot arrived at Barbados and then sailed for St Vincent. Harriot finally arrived at Tortola on 12 December 1803 with 186 captives. She sold her captives there. She sailed for Liverpool on 20 June 1804, and arrived back there on 6 August. She had left Liverpool with 20 crew members and she suffered eight crew deaths on her voyage.

5th slave voyage (1804–1805): Captain Everett sailed from Liverpool on 27 October 1804, bound for West Africa. In 1801, 147 ships sailed from British ports bound for Africa to engage in acquiring and transporting enslaved people; 126 of these vessels sailed from Liverpool.

Harriot arrived at St Lucia on 3 May 1805 with 219 captives. She arrived back at Liverpool on 9 November.

When Harriet, Everitt, master returned to Liverpool from Africa and St Lucia her cargo consisted of 176 elephants' teeth, 1900 billets of redwood, 174 hogsheads of sugar, 167 bales of cotton, six cases of coffee, five dozen coconuts, and one barrel of sugar for Everitt's personal account.

Year	Master	Owner	Trade	Source & notes
1806	R.Everett; Towerson	M'Dowall; Stilt & Co.	Liverpool–Africa; Buenos Aires	LR; lengthened 1792, repairs 1796, & large repair 1806
1808	E.Towerson	W.Stitt & Co.	Liverpool–Buenos Aires; Whithaven-Brazils	LR; large repair 1806

On 21 January 1808, Harriet's cargo from Monte Video was offered for sale. It consisted of 8600 ox and cow hides, and 60 "murquitos" (bales of tallow).

On 8 June 1808, Captain Thomas Hammond acquired a letter of marque. Although neither LR or the Register of Shipping showed a change of master, Lloyds List reported in December 1808 that Harriot, Hammond, master, had arrived at Whitehaven from the Brazils.

== Fate ==
Harriet was last listed in LR in 1814 with data unchanged for over five years.
