= Irlam (1825 ship) =

United Kingdom
- Name: Irlam
- Owner: Barton & Co.
- Builder: Liverpool
- Launched: 1825
- Fate: Wrecked 11 August 1831

General characteristics
- Tons burthen: 299 (bm)

Irlam was launched in 1825 at Liverpool for Barton & Co., which had lost two earlier vessels named Irlam: Irlam (1800 ship) in 1812, and Irlam (1813 ship) in 1824. The current Irlam was smaller than her predecessors, but was employed in the same trade, Liverpool–Barbados.

Irlam entered Lloyd's Register in 1826 with D. Campbell, master, Barton & Co., owner, and trade Liverpool–Barbados. Her listing in the Register of Shipping in 1826 has the same information.

In 1831 her master was J. Taylor.

Irlam was wrecked on 11 August 1831 in the Great Barbados Hurricane of 1831. Sixteen vessels, barks, brigs, brigantines, and schooners were driven ashore. Irlam was one of the two barks driven onshore. All the vessels, with the exception of two mail boats and a schooner, were totally lost.
