= List of shipwrecks in August 1831 =

The list of shipwrecks in August 1831 includes ships sunk, foundered, grounded, or otherwise lost during August 1831.

== 2 August ==
List of shipwrecks: 2 August 1831
Ship	State	Description
Hind	United Kingdom	The ship was driven ashore east of Wells-next-the-Sea, Norfolk.
Theodosia	United Kingdom	The ship was driven ashore east of Wells-next-the-Sea. She was on a voyage from South Shields, County Durham to Newham, Essex.

== 8 August ==
List of shipwrecks: 8 August 1831
Ship	State	Description
Medal	United States	The ship was wrecked on Little Heneaga, Bahamas. She was on a voyage from Baltimore, Maryland to Jamaica.

== 9 August ==
List of shipwrecks: 9 August 1831
Ship	State	Description
Lady Sherbrooke	United Kingdom	The ship was wrecked on Mouse Island, in the Gulf of Saint Lawrence with the loss of 241 of the 273 people on board. She was on a voyage from Londonderry to Quebec City, Lower Canada, British North America. Her captain was subsequently found guilty of wilfully wrecking the ship and was sentenced to death.
Matchless	United Kingdom	The ship was wrecked in the Abaco Islands. She was on a voyage from London to Havana, Cuba.

== 11 August ==
List of shipwrecks: 11 August 1831
Ship	State	Description
Adelaide	(United Kingdom of Great Britain and Ireland) Saint Vincent	The sloop was driven ashore in a hurricane at Kingstown, Saint Vincent.
Agenoria	United Kingdom	The brig was driven ashore and wrecked in a hurricane at Kingstown, Saint Vincent.
Alliance	United Kingdom	The brig was driven ashore in a hurricane at Barbados.
Ann	United Kingdom	The schooner was driven ashore in a hurricane at Barbados.
Antoinette	United Kingdom	The brig was driven ashore in a hurricane at Barbados.
Arethusa	United Kingdom	The barque was driven ashore in a hurricane at Barbados.
Ariel	(United Kingdom of Great Britain and Ireland) Saint Vincent	The sloop was driven ashore in a hurricane at Kingstown, Saint Vincent.
Aurora	(United Kingdom of Great Britain and Ireland) Saint Vincent	The schooner was driven ashore in a hurricane at Saint Vincent.
Barbadoes Packet	(United Kingdom of Great Britain and Ireland) British North America	The ship was driven ashore in a hurricane at Kingstown, Saint Vincent.
Barbadoes	United Kingdom	The mailboat was driven ashore in a hurricane at Barbados.
Commerce	(United Kingdom of Great Britain and Ireland) British North America	The brig was driven ashore in a hurricane at Saint Vincent. All 30 crew were rescued.
Dasher	United Kingdom	The ship was wrecked on Conk Reef, in the Atlantic Ocean off the coast of Florida, United States. She was on a voyage from "Laguira" to London.
Decagon	United Kingdom	The brig was driven ashore in a hurricane at Barbados.
Delta	(United Kingdom of Great Britain and Ireland) Saint Vincent	The schooner was driven ashore in a hurricane on Canouan, Grenadines.
Despatch	(United Kingdom of Great Britain and Ireland) Saint Vincent	The sloop was driven ashore in a hurricane in Greethead's Bay, Saint Vincent.
Diamond	(United Kingdom of Great Britain and Ireland) British North America	The brig was driven ashore in a hurricane at Kingstown, Saint Vincent.
Dove	United States	The brigantine was driven ashore at Kingstown, Saint Vincent.
Duncan Ferguson	(United Kingdom of Great Britain and Ireland) Saint Lucia	The sloop was wrecked at Saint Lucia with the loss of a crew member.
Eliza	United Kingdom	The brig was driven ashore in a hurricane at Barbados.
Elizabeth	(United Kingdom of Great Britain and Ireland) British North America	The ship was driven ashore in a hurricane at Saint Vincent.
Emerald	(United Kingdom of Great Britain and Ireland) British North America	The ship was driven ashore in a hurricane at Saint Vincent.
Emily	(United Kingdom of Great Britain and Ireland) Saint Vincent	The schooner was driven ashore in a hurricane at Kingstown, Saint Vincent.
Eurus	(United Kingdom of Great Britain and Ireland) Saint Vincent	The sloop was driven ashore in a hurricane at Kingstown, Saint Vincent.
Exchange	United Kingdom	The brig was driven ashore in a hurricane at Barbados.
Fanny	(United Kingdom of Great Britain and Ireland) Saint Vincent	The sloop was driven ashore in a hurricane in Greethead's Bay, Saint Vincent.
Henry	(United Kingdom of Great Britain and Ireland) British North America	The ship was driven ashore in a hurricane at Saint Vincent.
Henry Clay	United States	The schooner was driven ashore in a hurricane at Kingstown, Saint Vincent.
Horatio Nelson	United Kingdom	The brig was driven ashore in a hurricane at Barbados.
Irlam	United Kingdom	The barque was driven ashore in a hurricane at Barbados.
Jane	(United Kingdom of Great Britain and Ireland) Mustique	The Sloop was driven ashore in a hurricane at Mustique.
Kezia	United Kingdom	The brig was driven ashore in a hurricane at Barbados.
Lady of the Isles	(United Kingdom of Great Britain and Ireland) Saint Vincent	The sloop was driven ashore in a hurricane at Kingstown, Saint Vincent.
Lady's Adventure	(United Kingdom of Great Britain and Ireland) Saint Vincent	The sloop was driven ashore in a hurricane at Kingstown, Saint Vincent.
Mary	United Kingdom	The brig was driven ashore in a hurricane at Barbados.
Montague	United Kingdom	The mailboat was driven ashore in a hurricane at Barbados.
Neptune	(United Kingdom of Great Britain and Ireland) British North America	The ship was driven ashore in a hurricane at Saint Vincent.
Orleans	(United Kingdom of Great Britain and Ireland) British North America	The ship was driven ashore in a hurricane at Saint Vincent.
Perseverance	United Kingdom	The schooner was driven ashore in a hurricane at Barbados.
Quebec	United Kingdom	The brig was driven ashore in a hurricane at Barbados.
Rambler	(United Kingdom of Great Britain and Ireland) Saint Vincent	The schooner was driven ashore in a hurricane at Kingstown, Saint Vincent.
Samuel Hinds	United Kingdom	The brigantine was driven ashore in a hurricane at Barbados.
Sarah Ward	United Kingdom	The full-rigged ship was driven ashore and wrecked in a hurricane at Kingstown, Saint Vincent.
Sector	(United Kingdom of Great Britain and Ireland) Saint Vincent	The schooner was driven ashore in a hurricane at Kingstown, Saint Vincent.
Shark	(United Kingdom of Great Britain and Ireland) Saint Vincent	The sloop was driven ashore in a hurricane on Bequia, Grenadines.
St. Vincent	(United Kingdom of Great Britain and Ireland) Bermuda	The ship was driven ashore in a hurricane at Saint Vincent.
Susannah	(United Kingdom of Great Britain and Ireland) Saint Vincent	The sloop was driven ashore in a hurricane at Kingstown, Saint Vincent.
Thetis	United Kingdom	The sloop was driven ashore in a hurricane at Kingstown, Saint Vincent.
Triangle	(United Kingdom of Great Britain and Ireland) Saint Vincent	The sloop was driven ashore in a hurricane at Saint Vincent.
Trinidad	(United Kingdom of Great Britain and Ireland) British North America	The ship was driven ashore in a hurricane at Saint Vincent.
Union	(United Kingdom of Great Britain and Ireland) Saint Vincent	The schooner was driven ashore in a hurricane at Saint Vincent.
Wellwood	United Kingdom	The ship was driven ashore and wrecked on "Lavenscar Island". She was on a voyage from Havana, Cuba to Saint Petersburg, Russia.
William M^{c}Call	(United Kingdom of Great Britain and Ireland) Saint Vincent	The sloop was driven ashore in a hurricane at Calliaqua, Saint Vincent.
Zephyr	(United Kingdom of Great Britain and Ireland) Saint Vincent	The schooner was driven ashore in a hurricane on Bequia, Grenadines.

== 13 August ==
List of shipwrecks: 13 August 1831
Ship	State	Description
Duchess of Portland	United Kingdom	The ship encountered a violent hurricane as she was sailing for England from Aux Cayes. The hurricane threw her on her beam ends and she stayed that way for eight hours. She lost one of her boats, several sails, and was obliged to cut away her spare spars.
Frances Ann	United States	The ship was wrecked in the "Fuskett Islands". Her crew were rescued. She was on a voyage from New York to Saint John, New Brunswick, British North America.
Perseverance	United Kingdom	The ship foundered whilst on a voyage from Martinique to Barbados.

== 16 August ==
List of shipwrecks: 16 August 1831
Ship	State	Description
Chieftain	United Kingdom	The steamship ran aground in the Copeland Islands, County Down. Her passengers were rescued. She was on a voyage from Belfast, County Antrim to Liverpool, Lancashire. Chieftain was refloated on 18 August and taken in to Belfast.
Dispatch	(United Kingdom of Great Britain and Ireland) Nevis	The sloop was driven ashore and wrecked by a "severe ground swell" at Saint Kitts.
Eight Sisters	(United Kingdom of Great Britain and Ireland) Saint Kitts	The schooner was driven ashore and wrecked by a "severe ground swell" at Saint Kitts.
Greyhound	(United Kingdom of Great Britain and Ireland) Saint Kitts	The schooner was driven ashore and wrecked by a "severe ground swell" at Saint Kitts with the loss of three of her crew.
Industry	(Netherlands) Sint Eustatius	The sloop was driven ashore and wrecked by a "severe ground swell" at Saint Kitts.
Rambler	(United Kingdom of Great Britain and Ireland) Saint Kitts	The sloop was driven ashore and wrecked by a "severe ground swell" at Saint Kitts.

== 17 August ==
List of shipwrecks: 17 August 1831
Ship	State	Description
Dart	United Kingdom	The ship was driven ashore crewless on Barbados. She was on a voyage from Newfoundland, British North America to Barbados.
Felix Leopold	France	The ship was driven ashore in the Mississippi River. She was on a voyage from Bordeaux, Gironde to Campeche, Mexico. She was refloated on 12 November.
Norval	United Kingdom	The ship was wrecked near "Cape Rofo" or "Cape Roxo", Africa with the loss of at least five lives. She was on a voyage from London to the Cape Colony.
Rothsay Castle	United Kingdom	Rothesay Castle. The paddle steamer began to sink in heavy seas and eventually ran aground on Dutchman Bank at the eastern end of the Menai Strait with the loss of 93 lives, on a voyage from Liverpool to Beaumaris. There were 23 survivors.
Ulysses	United Kingdom	The ship foundered at Belize, British Honduras.

== 18 August ==
List of shipwrecks: 18 August 1831
Ship	State	Description
Ben Nevis	United Kingdom	The paddle steamer was driven ashore and wrecked near Campbeltown, Argyllshire. All on board were rescued. She was on a voyage from Stornoway, Isle of Lewis to Glasgow, Renfrewshire.

== 19 August ==
List of shipwrecks: 19 August 1831
Ship	State	Description
Fancy	United Kingdom	The ship was driven ashore at Spurn Point, Yorkshire. Her crew were rescued. She was on a voyage from London to Newcastle upon Tyne, Northumberland.
John	United Kingdom	The ship was driven ashore and severely damaged at Blackpool, Lancashire. Her four crew survived.
Liberty	United Kingdom	The ship sprang a leak and foundered in the North Sea. Her crew were rescued by Maria (France).
Prosper	United Kingdom	The trow foundered in the River Severn. Her crew survived.
Viewly Hill	United Kingdom	The ship was driven ashore at Great Yarmouth, Norfolk. Her crew were rescued.
Yare	United Kingdom	The ship was driven ashore at Great Yarmouth. Her crew were rescued.

== 20 August ==
List of shipwrecks: 20 August 1831
Ship	State	Description
Berbice	United Kingdom	The ship was wrecked on the Hoyle Bank, in Liverpool Bay. Her crew were rescued. She was on a voyage from Saint Petersburg, Russia to Liverpool, Lancashire.
Fancy	United Kingdom	The ship was driven ashore at Withernsea, Yorkshire.
Laurel	United Kingdom	The ship foundered in the English Channel 15 nautical miles (28 km) off North Foreland, Kent. The seven people on board survived, but her captain died from a cause unrelated to the shipwreck before they reached land.
Pacific	United Kingdom	The ship was wrecked off Key West, Florida, United States. She was on a voyage from "Laguira" to London.
Pillhead	United Kingdom	The ship was sriven ashore at Lowestoft, Suffolk. Her cre were rescued. She was on a voyage from Teignmouth, Devon to Hull, Yorkshire.
Scarthingwell	United Kingdom	The ship was driven ashore south of Scarborough, Yorkshire. Her crew were rescued. She was on a voyage from Harwich, Essex to Sunderland, County Durham.
Strela (Стрела, 'Arrow')	Imperial Russian Navy	The schooner was lost without a trace in a storm near Kõpu Peninsula of Hiiumaa, presumed foundered with the loss of all 54 crew.

== 22 August ==
List of shipwrecks: 22 August 1831
Ship	State	Description
Addison	United Kingdom	The ship departed from Liverpool, Lancashire for Pictou, Nova Scotia, British North America. No further trace, presumed foundered in the Atlantic Ocean with the loss of all hands.
Polygon	United Kingdom	The ship was lost in the Saint Lawrence River. She was on a voyage from Saint Vincent to Quebec City, Lower Canada, British North America.
Rosemount	United Kingdom	The ship was wrecked on Grand Manan Island, New Brunswick, British North America. She was on a voyage from the Clyde to Saint John, New Brunswick.

== 23 August ==
List of shipwrecks: 23 August 1831
Ship	State	Description
Hebe	United Kingdom	The ship was wrecked in the Crozet Islands. Her crew were rescued.
New Tamar	United Kingdom	The ship sprang a leak and foundered in the Irish Sea off Burrow Head, Wigtownshire. She was on a voyage from Newcastle, County Down to Whitehaven, Cumberland.
Paragon	United Kingdom	The sloop was run down and sunk in the North Sea off St. Abb's Head, Berwickshire by Lavinia (United Kingdom). Her crew were rescued by Lavinia.

== 25 August ==
List of shipwrecks: 25 August 1831
Ship	State	Description
Charlotte	United Kingdom	The ship ran aground and was damaged in the River Avon, Bristol, Gloucestershire. She was on a voyage from Saint Andrews, New Brunswick, British North America to Bristol.
Liberty	United Kingdom	The ship sprang a leak and foundered in the North Sea (53°59′N 6°30′E). Her crew were rescued.
Six Brothers	United Kingdom	The sloop foundered in Dublin Bay. Her crew were rescued.

== 26 August ==
List of shipwrecks: 26 August 1831
Ship	State	Description
Elizabeth	United Kingdom	The ship was wrecked on Redness Point, Cumberland. She was on a voyage from Dublin to Whitehaven, Cumberland.

== 27 August ==
List of shipwrecks: 27 August 1831
Ship	State	Description
Cherokee	United Kingdom	The ship was driven ashore and wrecked 3 nautical miles (5.6 km) south of Milford Haven, Pembrokeshire. Her crew were rescued. She was on a voyage from New Calabar to Liverpool, Lancashire.
Frances	United Kingdom	The ship was wrecked on Barbuda. She was on a voyage from Jamaica to Quebec City, Lower Canada, British North America.

== 31 August ==
List of shipwrecks: 31 August 1831
Ship	State	Description
Betsy and Mary	United Kingdom	The ship was sighted in Loch Laxford on this date whilst on a voyage from Wick, Caithness to Limerick. No further trace, presumed foundered with the loss of all hands.
Maria Elizabeth	Russia	The ship was driven ashore and sank at Kronstadt.

== Unknown date ==
List of shipwrecks: Unknown date 1831
Ship	State	Description
Elizabeth	United Kingdom	The brig was wrecked on a reef in the Pacific Ocean (29°37′S 158°58′E).
Mariner	United Kingdom	The ship was driven ashore and wrecked at Tampico, Mexico before 22 August.
Wanderer	United Kingdom	The ship was wrecked on an ice island before 8 August. Her crew were rescued. She was on a voyage from Saint John, New Brunswick, British North America to Bristol, Gloucestershire.
