= USS Syren (1803) =

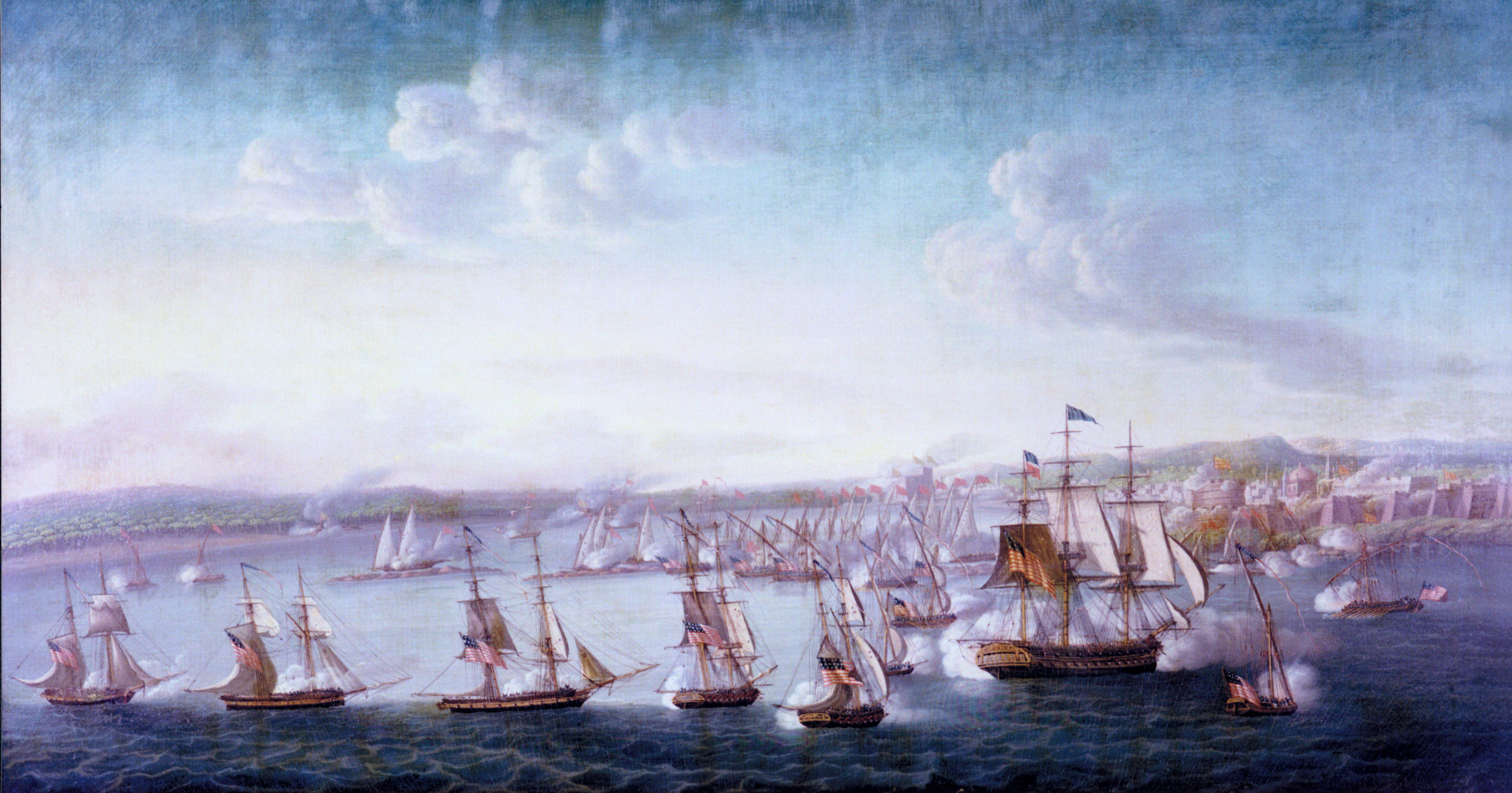
- USS Syren (fourth from left) during the bombardment of Tripoli in 1804.

History

United States
- Name: USS Syren
- Builder: Nathaniel Hutton
- Cost: $32,522
- Laid down: 1803
- Launched: 6 August 1803
- Commissioned: 1 September 1803
- Renamed: Siren, 1809
- Fate: Captured at sea, 12 July 1814

United Kingdom
- Name: Siren
- Acquired: 12 July 1814 by capture
- Commissioned: Not commissioned
- Fate: Not listed after 1815

General characteristics
- Type: Brig
- Displacement: 240 long tons (244 t)
- Tons burthen: 298 (bm)
- Length: 94 ft 3 1/2 in (28.7 m) (overall); c,75 ft 0 in (22.9 m)
- Beam: 27 ft 0 in (8.23 m)
- Draft: 11 feet 2 inches aft, 7 feet 4 inches forward.
- Depth of hold: 12 ft 6 in (3.81 m)
- Propulsion: Sail
- Complement: 120 officers and enlisted
- Armament: 16 × 24-pounder carronades

USS Syren (later Siren) was a brig of the United States Navy built at Philadelphia in 1803. She served during the First Barbary War and the War of 1812 until the Royal Navy captured her in 1814. The British never commissioned her but apparently used her for a year or so as a lazaretto, or a prison vessel. She then disappears from records.

== Description ==
Syren was designed by Benjamin Hutton, Jr. of Philadelphia and built for the Navy in 1803 at Philadelphia by shipwright Nathaniel Hutton and launched on 6 August 1803. Capt. Bainbridge supervised her construction. She was commissioned in September and in a letter dated 9 May, 1803 Lieutenant Charles Stewart was appointed in command as of her launching, but was appointed to supervise her construction on 28 May.

She was sharper, but smaller than USS Argus (1803), yet carried the same armament. Both vessels were built the same year for the First Barbary War.

== Service history in US Navy ==
=== First Barbary War ===
Syren departed Philadelphia on 27 August 1803 passing by Cape Henlopen on 3 September and reached Gibraltar on 1 October. On 11 October, 1803 in Tangier Bay she collided with USS New York, almost being run down by the frigate, receiving damage to her rigging and losing an anchor. Three days later she sailed via Livorno to Algiers carrying presents and money to the Dey of Algiers. just after midnight 29 November while at sea she was caught by a severe storm, being put on her beams ens, filled to the waist with water and her jolly boat destroyed. She then sailed to Algiers, arriving on 21 December and then on to Syracuse, Sicily, where she arrived 28 December, 1804 where repairs were made.

The first action Syren was involved in was an attack aimed at destroying USS Philadelphia, a frigate that had run aground the previous autumn and that Tripolitan gunboats had then captured. To prevent Philadelphia from opposing his planned operations against Tripoli, the commander of the American squadron in the Mediterranean, Commodore Edward Preble, decided to destroy her. To achieve this, Syren and ketch Intrepid sailed from Syracuse on 3 February 1804 and proceeded to Tripoli, which they reached on 7 February. However, before the American ships could launch their attack, they were driven off by a violent gale and did not get back off Tripoli until 16 February. Before the attack Syren tied up alongside Intrepid to transfer some of her crew for the assault on Philadelphia. Aboard Intrepid, under the command of Stephen Decatur, sailors from both Intrepid and Syren succeeded in burning Philadelphia. Also present during the assault was Thomas Macdonough of Syren.

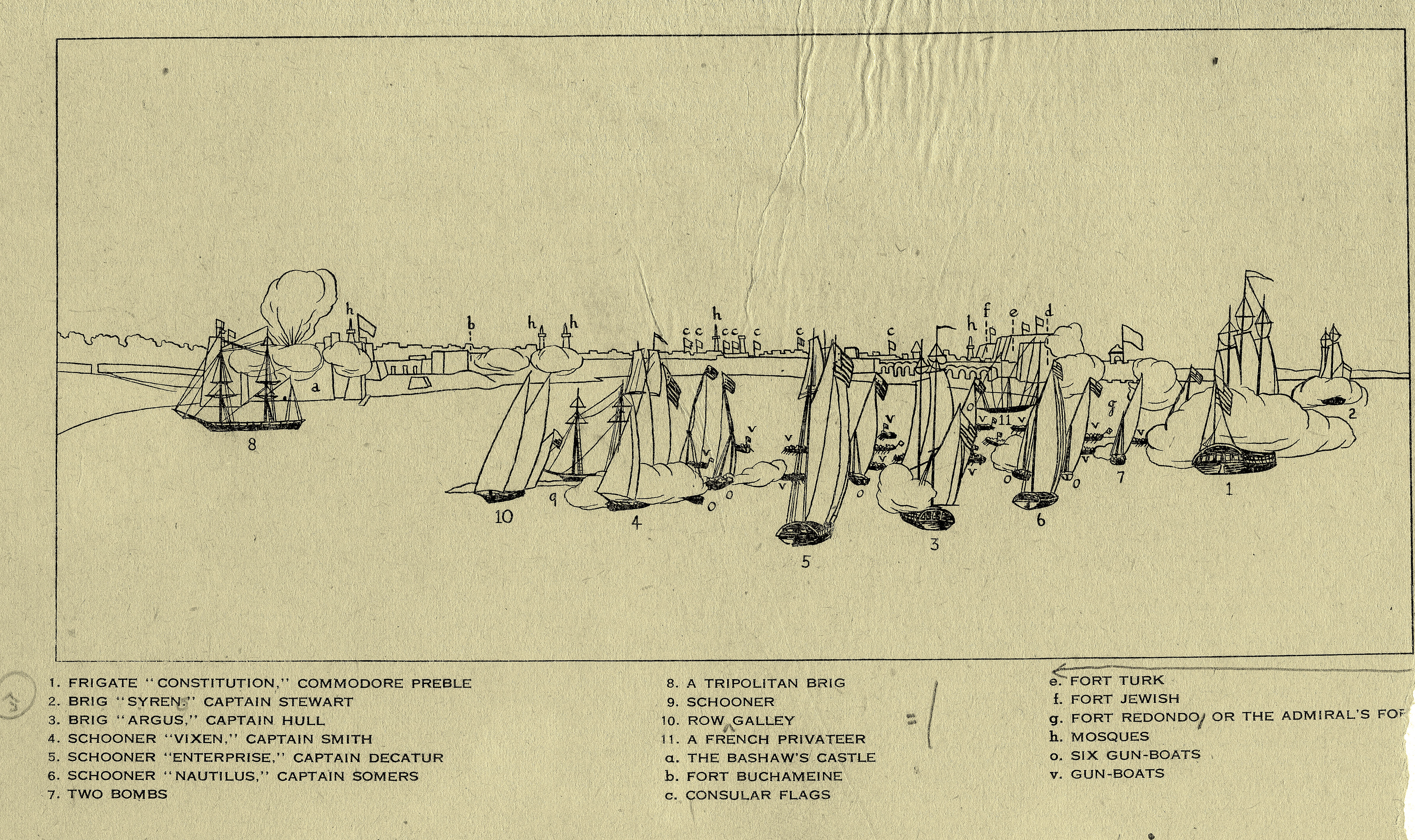
Bombardment of Tripoli, 1804

Syren returned to Syracuse on the morning of 19 February. On 5 March she detained a Prussian brig on a voyage from Tunis to Candia with Turkish passengers, she was sent to Malta, arriving same day, where Squadron Commander Preble immediately released her. On 9 March, she and USS Nautilus sailed for Tripoli. Soon after their arrival, on 17 March 1804, she captured the Maltese armed brig Transfer belonging to Count Golena. Stewart took Transfer into US service and renamed her USS Scourge. She then served in the American squadron. On 20 March she collided with USS Nautilus, causing damage to Nautilas that she had to return to port. On 22 March Syren captured a Russian flagged polacca named Madonna di Catapoliani or "Madona de Catapolaigne" and sent her to Malta. Capt. Preble ordered her released on 25 March after arrival. Operations in the Mediterranean during the spring and summer of 1804 and participated in the attacks on Tripoli in August and September 1804. The ship continued to support the squadron's operation against Tripoli which forced the Pasha to accede to American demands. On 2 July, 1805 Master Commandant Stewart turned command over to Master Commandant John Smith. After a peace treaty with Tripoli was signed on 10 June 1805, the brig remained in the Mediterranean for almost a year helping to establish and maintain satisfactory relations with other Barbary States. On 30 July she was with the U.S. fleet at Tunis.

The ship sailed for America 28 May, 1806, was off the Capes 25 July and reached the Washington Navy Yard about 1 August. She was laid up in ordinary there until recommissioned in 1807 and subsequently carried dispatches to France in 1809. In 1809, her sailing master at the Norfolk Navy Yard was Captain John "Mad Jack" Percival. The following year, her name was changed to Siren.

=== War of 1812 ===
Little record has been found of the brig's service during the War of 1812, however small news items appeared in the Salem Gazette and the Boston Gazette.

In May 1813 it was reported that within the space of two days a merchant vessel, Pilgrim, was boarded, first by HMS Herald which was searching for Syren, and then by Syren, which was searching for Herald. Syren was now commanded by Lieutenant Joseph Bainbridge. The following month Syren left Belize and proceeded to Cuba where after three weeks searching for a Royal Navy sloop, probably Herald, she sailed for the coast of Florida putting in at New Orleans before departing on 9 May 1813. No prizes were taken during this voyage and the ship needed repairs.

By January 1814 Syren was in Massachusetts and was now commanded by Lieutenant Parker, In February she sailed along with a privateer, Grand Turk. Not long after sailing Parker died and command transferred to Lieutenant N.J. Nicholson.

Syren captured at least three merchant ships off the coast of Africa. On 28 May she captured and burnt Barton, Hassler, master, which had been sailing from Africa to Liverpool. Then on 1 June Syren captured Adventure, which too was from Africa to Liverpool. She took-off their cargoes of ivory and sank them. Lastly, at some point Syren captured Catherine.

On 12 July 1814 Syren while cruising off the West African coast encountered the British ship HMS Medway a 74-gun third rate ship of the line under the command of Captain Augustus Brine. Heavily outgunned, Syren attempted to run. After an 11-hour chase Medway captured her despite Syren having lightened her load by throwing overboard her guns, anchors and boats. During her last voyage she had captured or sunk several British merchantmen. Among the prisoners was Samuel Leech, who later wrote an account of his experiences.

According to Samuel Leech, after being captured the crew of Syren were taken to the Cape of Good Hope, and after landing at Simonstown, marched to a jail in Cape Town. Here they were held until transferred to England when the war was over. On arriving at Simonstown, other American prisoners were seen to be leaving the jail and being shipped off to Dartmoor. The Syren crew met these again in England while waiting for transfer to the United States.

== British service history ==
After her capture by the Royal Navy she had a figurehead of a mermaid installed.

The Royal Navy used her as a lazaretto. She is no longer listed after 1815.

== Bibliography ==
- Skaggs, David Curtis (2003). Thomas Macdonough: Master of command in the early U.S. Navy. Naval Institute Press, Annapolis, MD. p. 257. ISBN 1-55750-839-9. Url
- Winfield, Rif (2008). British Warships in the Age of Sail 1793–1817: Design, Construction, Careers and Fates. Seaforth. ISBN 978-1-86176-246-7.
