= HMS Medway (1812) =

Vengeur-class ship of the line

- Plan drawing of Medway

History

United Kingdom
- Name: Medway
- Ordered: 19 August 1807
- Builder: Thomas Pitcher, Northfleet
- Laid down: December 1808
- Launched: 19 November 1812
- Commissioned: April 1813
- Fate: Sold, 2 November 1865

General characteristics (as built)
- Class & type: Vengeur-class ship of the line
- Tons burthen: 1,768 (bm)
- Length: 176 ft 1 in (53.7 m) (gundeck)
- Beam: 47 ft 10 in (14.6 m)
- Draught: 16 ft 11 in (5.2 m) (light)
- Depth of hold: 21 ft (6.4 m)
- Sail plan: Full-rigged ship
- Complement: 590
- Armament: 74 muzzle-loading, smoothbore guns; Gundeck: 28 × 32 pdr guns; Upper deck: 28 × 18 pdr guns; Quarterdeck: 4 × 12 pdr guns + 10 × 32 pdr carronades; Forecastle: 2 × 12 pdr guns + 2 × 32 pdr carronades

HMS Medway was a 74-gun third rate Vengeur-class ship of the line built for the Royal Navy in the first decade of the 19th century. Completed in 1813, she played a minor role in the Napoleonic Wars.

== Naval service ==
At 7am on 4 July 1814, Medway was under the command of Captain Augustus Brine when she encountered the USS Syren, a 16-gun United States brig. An eleven-hour chase ensued, with Syren's crew throwing their cannons, anchors and ballast overboard in the hope of escaping the pursuing British vessel. Their efforts were insufficient and the American vessel was surrendered at sunset. Her crew of 137 men were taken prisoner, and her cargo of ivory impounded and later paid out to Medway's crew as prize money for the capture. (Note: A first-class share of the prize money was worth £195 16s 4½d; a sixth-class share, that of an ordinary seaman, was worth 13s 11½d.)

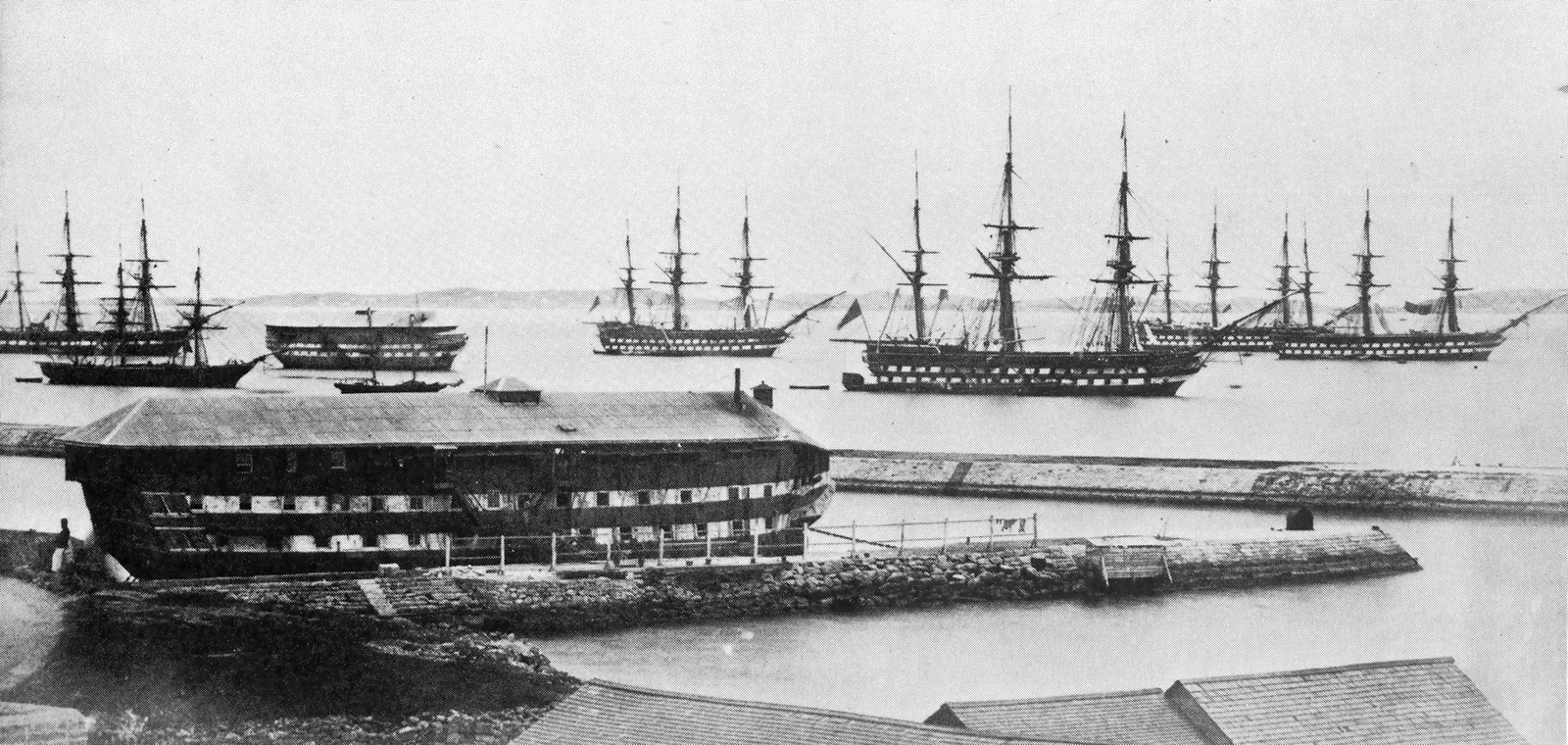
The hulk of Medway at HMD Bermuda in 1862

Medway was converted to serve as a prison ship at the Royal Naval Dockyard on Ireland Island in Bermuda in 1847. The colony had been selected for development as the primary British naval and military base in the North American and West Indian region following the loss of all British ports between Nova Scotia and the West Indies with American Independence. Bermuda's manpower was entirely devoted to shipbuilding and seafaring, and the shortage of cheap manual labour led the Admiralty to import convicts from British and Irish prisons, who were housed in hulks like the Medway. Conditions for the convicts were harsh, and discipline was draconian.

In 1849, convict James Cronin, on Medway, was placed in solitary confinement from the 25th to the 29th for fighting. On release, and being returned to work, he refused to be cross-ironed. He ran onto the breakwater, brandishing a poker threateningly. For this, he was ordered to receive punishment (presumably flogging) on Tuesday, 3 July 1849, with the other convicts aboard the hulk assembled behind a rail to witness. When ordered to strip, he hesitated. Thomas Cronin, his older brother, addressed him and, while brandishing a knife, rushed forward to the separating rail. He called out to the other prisoners in Gaelic and many joined him in attempting to free the prisoner and attack the officers. The officers opened fire. Two men were killed and twelve wounded. Punishment of James Cronin was then carried out. Three hundred men of the 42nd Regiment of Foot, in barracks on Ireland Island, responded to the scene under arms.

Medway was sold out of the Navy in 1865.

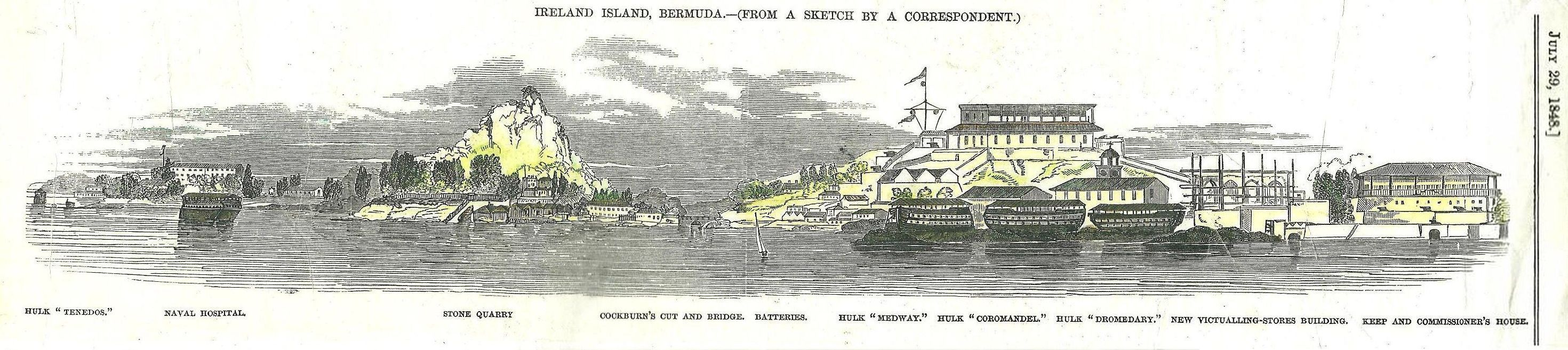
An 1848 woodcut of HMD Bermuda, Ireland Island, Bermuda, with hulks, including the Medway.
