= Irlam (1800 ship) =

British merchant vessel (1800–1812)

Great Britain
- Name: Irlam
- Namesake: George Irlam
- Owner: 1801: Irlam & Co.; 1802:Barton & Co.
- Builder: Liverpool
- Launched: 1800
- Fate: Wrecked May 1812

General characteristics
- Tons burthen: 380, or 407 (bm)
- Complement: 1801:30; 1803:35; 1803:35
- Armament: 1801:12 × 9-pounder guns; 1802:16 × 9-pounder guns + 4 × 18-pounder carronades; 1803:16 × 9-pounder guns; 1803:16 × 9-pounder guns

Irlam was launched in 1800 at Liverpool as a West Indiaman, sailing between Liverpool and Barbados. Although a merchantman and not a privateer, she made an unusually aggressive use of her letter of marque, capturing or recapturing four vessels. She wrecked on Tuskar Rock in 1812.

== Career ==
Irlam first appears in the 1801 volume of Lloyd's Register with R. Ramsey, master, Irlam & Co., owners, and trade Liverpool−Barbados. Captain Robert Ramsey acquired a letter of marque on 24 January 1801.

After the war with France resumed in 1803 Ramsey again acquired a letter of marque, this time on 26 May. Lloyd's List reported on 21 October 1803 that Irlam had arrived at Liverpool. She had left Barbados on 31 August. On her way home she had captured Adolphus, from Mauritius, and sent her into Cork.

On 15 December Captain George Keyzar (or Keyser) acquired a letter of marque.

On 10 March 1804 Irlam, Captain Keyzar, was at Demerara. Before she sailed again, Barton, Irlam, and Higginson put an advertisement in the Liverpool Chronicle stating that Irlam, of 24 guns, 9- and 18-pounders, and upwards of 50 men, was preparing to sail end-October. The advertisement further stated that she "carries letters of marque, with liberties to chace, capture, and man prizes".

On 14 January 1806 Lloyd's List reported that Irlam, Keyser, master, and bound for Barbados, had to put back into Liverpool after having sustained damage in a gale. Several other vessels also had to put back, and one or two were lost.

Irlam and Tiger, also owned by Barton & Co., left Barbados on 12 March 1808 and were reported on 22 April to have arrived at Liverpool.

Lloyd's List reported on 21 March 1809 that Irlam had arrived at Liverpool. On her way home she had captured a French brig with 300 hogsheads of sugar. Irlam had parted from her prize on 17 March.

On 10 March 1809, the brig Batavia, Falliates, master, arrived at New York. On 16 January the sloop-of-war HMS Comet captured her and sent her for Plymouth. However, on 17 January Batavia's crew recaptured her. Then on 26 February Irlam captured her. On 8 March, Batavia's captain, cook, and steward again recaptured her. (An earlier report had credited HMS Cormorant with the first capture of Batavia, and did not mention her crew recapturing her a second time.)

On 7 May 1810, Irlam recaptured Nelly, late Wilson, master. Nelly had been captured on 5 May as she was sailing from St Kitts to Liverpool. She reached Liverpool on 24 May.

The Register of Shipping for 1812 showed Irlam with Keyzor, master, Barton & Co., owners, and trade Liverpool–Barbados.

== Loss ==
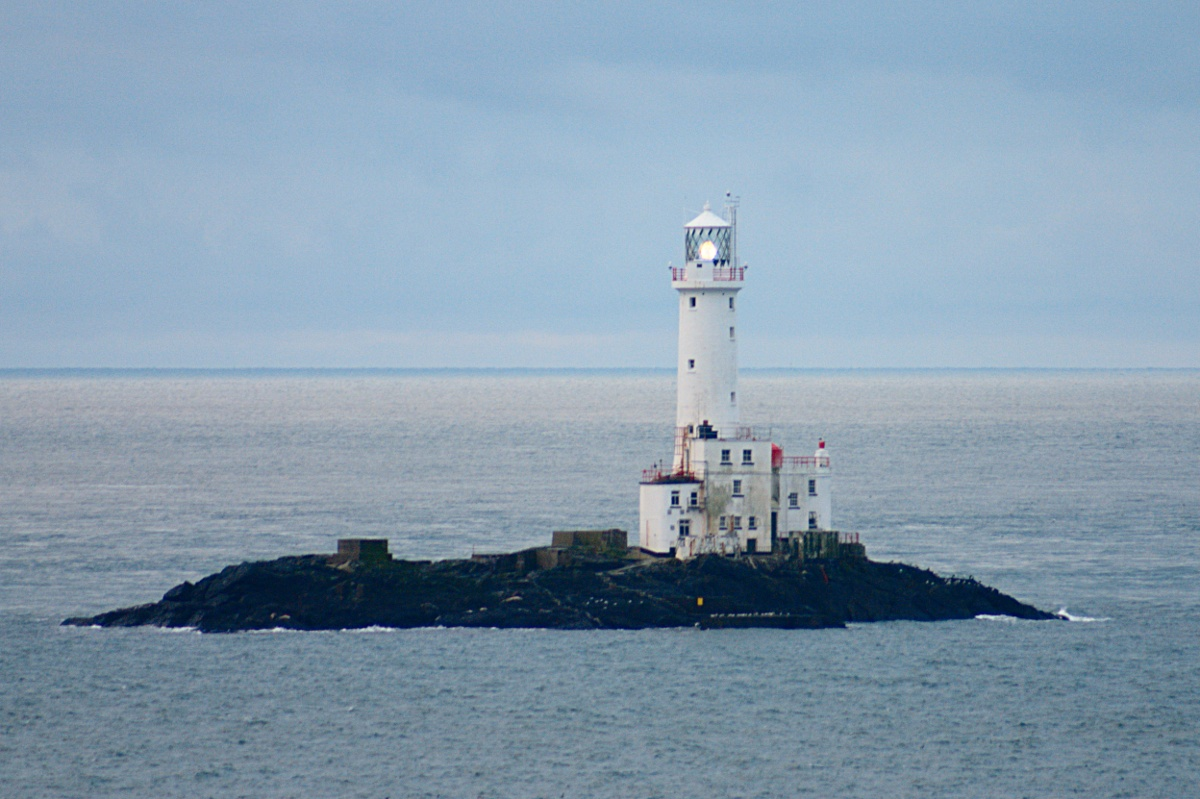
The Tuskar Rock lighthouse completed in 1815 but under construction in 1812 when Irlam wrecked

On 10 May 1812, Irlam, under the command of Captain Keyzar, was coming from Barbados and sailing towards Liverpool with a cargo of sugar and cotton. She was also carrying passengers: Captain Hall of the 16th Regiment of Foot, ten more officers, 62 rank and file, and 32 women and children. She was sailing in thick haze when she wrecked on Tuskar Rock.

All of those aboard were able to ascend the rock with the help of workmen who providentially were there to build a lighthouse. The workmen used ropes to haul all up the rock face, and brought the children and infants up in bags. The brig Sarah arrived and with her boats was able to retrieve most of the passengers and crew. Adverse winds forced Sarah to deliver the people she had rescued to Beaumaris on 12 May. Still, three army officers, sixteen privates, a woman, the mate, and twelve sailors had to wait on the rock until a second brig arrived on the 12th and took them to Wexford. Lloyd's List (LL) reported that a woman, two children, and a crew man had been drowned.
