= Queen Charlotte (ship) =

A number of sailing ships have been named Queen Charlotte.

== Naval vessels ==
- HMS Queen Charlotte - four vessels of the British Royal Navy have been named Queen Charlotte
- Hired armed cutter Queen Charlotte served the Royal Navy during the Napoleonic Wars and was involved in an heroic single ship action against a larger French vessel.
- HMCS Queen Charlotte is the Royal Canadian Naval Reserve Division in Charlottetown, Prince Edward Island, Canada.

== British merchant ships ==
- Queen Charlotte (1770 ship) was built in Ireland but did not appear in British online records until 1786. She made two voyages as a slave ship and was sold in Barbados in 1793 after delivering her slaves from her second voyage.
- Queen Charlotte (1781 ship) was built in France and taken in prize c.1781, probably on the Jamaica Station. She first appeared in British on-line records first as a privateer and then a transport. She was last listed in 1783.
- Queen Charlotte (1785 ship) was a British merchant ship launched in 1785 at Stockton for Etches & Co. Between September 1785 and 1788 she made a circumnavigation of the world in company with another ship that the company owned, the King George. The two vessels were engaged in the Maritime Fur Trade in the Pacific northwest. They sold their furs in China and returned to England with cargoes that they were carrying back for the British East India Company (EIC). In 1789 she was renamed Montreal. She was at Bordeaux at the outbreak of war with France in 1793 and the French government seized her.
- Queen Charlotte (1786 ship) was built in France and first appeared in Lloyd's Register (LR) in 1786, the 1785 issue, if any, not being available on line. She was employed as a Northern Fisheries whaler, sailing to Greenland and Davis Strait. From late 1793 she made at least one voyage as a West Indiaman. Although she was last listed in 1796, there is no evidence that she sailed again after late 1794.
- Queen Charlotte (1789 ship) was built in Philadelphia in 1780 almost certainly under another name. She appeared in British-origin online sources between 1789 and 1792, during which time she made two voyages as a whaler to the Southern Whale Fishery. She was last listed in 1796 with stale data.
- Queen Charlotte (1790 ship) was built on the Thames in 1790. She made eight voyages for the Hudson's Bay Company (HBC) before it sold her in 1800. She then traded to South America and the Mediterranean. In 1803 her crew mutinied and turned her over to the French, who promptly handed her and them back to the British authorities, despite the two countries being at war. She then spent much of her career sailing between London and the Cape of Good Hope (CGH; the Cape). She was sailing for the Cape in October 1813 when a collision with another vessel resulted in Queen Charlotte being wrecked shortly thereafter. She was probably salvaged to become Queen Charlotte (1815 ship)
- Queen Charlotte (1799 ship) was a French prize that first appeared in British on-line records in 1799. She was a West Indiaman that burnt in 1805.
- Queen Charlotte (1801 Calcutta ship) was launched at Calcutta and lost in the Bay of Bengal in 1804 or so.
- Queen Charlotte (1802 ship) was a smack launched in 1802 in Berwick-on-Tweed for the Old Ship Company of Berwick. She repelled in 1804 the attack of a French privateer in a single-ship action. A collier ran her down and sank her on 26 October 1826.
- Queen Charlotte (1810 ship) – ship of the Upper Canada Provincial Marine that later became HMS Queen Charlotte. In time she became USS Queen Charlotte, before returning to mercantile trade and being abandoned in 1844.
- Queen Charlotte (1813 ship) - launched in Australia and made two voyages on each of which she returned one convict from Bengal or Mauritius.
- Queen Charlotte (1815 ship) first appeared in online British sources in 1815 and was probably the salvaged Queen Charlotte, which had been sunk in 1813. From 1819 she traded with Brazil and Argentina and was burnt at Buenos Aires on 25 July 1822.
- Queen Charlotte was a vessel lost with all hands in a gale at Madras on 24 October 1818.

== Falmouth packet ships ==
- Queen Charlotte made one voyage to Charleston, South Carolina. A French vessel captured her on 1 September 1781 off Virginia.
- Queen Charlotte made several voyages across the Atlantic between 1788 and 1793. On her last voyage the French sloop Cerf chased her into New York.
- Queen Charlotte (1801 ship) was built in Emsworth in 1801. She was a regular packet ship for the Post Office Packet Service, sailing out of Falmouth. She made several voyages across the Atlantic between late 1802 and 16 May 1805 when she was captured. She came back into British hands around 1806. The Post Office took her into temporary service between 1812 and 1817. She then became a whaler off Peru in 1818. She remained in the Pacific Coast of South America until she was condemned there in 1820 as unseaworthy; she was last listed that same year. She may have been repaired and have continued to trade on the coast until 1822.
- Queen Charlotte (1807 packet) was a Falmouth packet boat, launched at Falmouth. She was wrecked at Lisbon in 1814.
