= List of ship launches in 1770 =

The list of ship launches in 1770 includes a chronological list of some ships launched in 1770.

Date	Ship	Class	Builder	Location	Country	Notes
22 January	Iassy	Transport ship	S. I. Afanaseyev	Saint Petersburg	Russia	For Imperial Russian Navy.
1 March	Khotin	Full-rigged ship	Ivan I. Afanaseyev	Saint Petersburg	Russia	For Imperial Russian Navy.
14 March	Azov	Azov-class sloop	S. I. Afanaseyev	Novopavlovsk	Russia	For Imperial Russian Navy.
14 March	Taganrog	Azov-class sloop	S. I. Afanaseyev	Novopavlovsk	Russia	For Imperial Russian Navy.
18 March	Novopavlovsk	Azov-class sloop	S. I. Afanaseyev	Ikoretskaya	Russia	For Imperial Russian Navy.
19 March	Modon	Azov-class sloop	S. I. Afanaseyev	Ikoretskaya	Russia	For Imperial Russian Navy.
19 March	Pervyi	Bomb vessel	S. I. Afanaseyev	Ikoretskaya	Russia	For Imperial Russian Navy.
26 March	Moreia	Azov-class sloop	S. I. Afanaseyev	Novopavlovsk	Russia	For Imperial Russian Navy.
11 April	Portland	Portland-class ship of the line	John Williams	Harwich	Great Britain	For Royal Navy.
12 April	Resolution	Elizabeth-class ship of the line	Adam Hayes	Deptford Dockyard	Great Britain	For Royal Navy.
14 April	Fedelta	Leon Trionfante-class ship of the line		Venice	Republic of Venice	For (Venice) Venetian Navy.
20 April	Koron	Azov-class sloop	S. I. Afanaseyev	Novopavlovsk	Russia	For Imperial Russian Navy.
24 April	Zhurza	Azov-class sloop	S. I. Afanaseyev	Novopavlovsk	Russia	For Imperial Russian Navy.
26 April	Bukharest	Sloop-of-war	S. I. Afanaseyev	Ikoretskaya	Russia	For Imperial Russian Navy.
26 April	Corriera Veneta	Leon Trionfante-class ship of the line		Venice	Republic of Venice	For (Venice) Venetian Navy.
26 May	Vtoroi	Bomb vessel	S. I. Afanaseyev	Ikoretskaya	Russia	For Imperial Russian Navy.
13 July	Kingfisher	Swallow-class ship-sloop	Joseph Harris	Chatham Dockyard	Great Britain	For Royal Navy.
4 October	Victoire	Third rate	La Frete Bernard	Lorient	Kingdom of France	For French Navy.
9 October	Chesma	Sviatoi Pavel-class ship of the line	I. V. James	Saint Petersburg	Russia	For Imperial Russian Navy.
19 November	Colebrooke	East Indiaman	John Perry	Blackwall Yard	Great Britain	For British East India Company.
24 November	Nuestra Señora del Carmen	Sixth rate	Reales Astilleros de Esteiro	Ferrol	Spain	For Spanish Navy.
4 December	Intrepid	Intrepid-class ship of the line	Joseph Harris, William Gray	Woolwich Dockyard	Great Britain	For Royal Navy.
31 December	San Pedro Apostol	San Pedro Apostol-class ship of the line	Reales Astilleros de Esteiro	Ferrol	Spain	For Spanish Navy.
Unknown date	Calcutta	East Indiaman	John Wells	Deptford	Great Britain	For British East India Company.
Unknown date	Duke of Portland	East Indiaman	John Perry	Blackwall Yard	Great Britain	For British East India Company.
Unknown date	Erfprins	Fourth rate	Peter Edwards	Amsterdam	Dutch Republic	For Dutch Republic Navy.
Unknown date	Honkoop	East Indiaman		Amsterdam	Dutch Republic	For Dutch East India Company.
Unknown date	Jason	Frigate	Paulus van Zwijndrecht	Rotterdam	Dutch Republic	For Dutch Republic Navy.
Unknown date	Marquis of Granby	Collier	Thomas Fishburn	Whitby	Great Britain	For private owner.
Unknown date	Marquis of Rockingham	Collier		Whitby	Great Britain	For private owner.
Unknown date	Nuestra Señora del Carmen	Frigate		Ferrol	Spain	For Spanish Navy.
Unknown date	Phoenix	Ketch		Bombay	India	For British East India Company.
Unknown date	Royal Bounty	Merchantman		South Carolina	Thirteen Colonies	For private owner.
Unknown date	Russell	Schooner		Bombay	India	For Bombay Pilot Service.
Unknown date	Santa Matilde	Schooner	Reales Astilleros de Esteiro	Ferrol	Spain	For Spanish Navy.
Unknown date	Sky	Cutter		Bombay	India	For private owner.
Unknown date	Swallow	Ketch		Bombay	India	For British East India Company.
Unknown date	Syren	Snow		Bombay	India	For British East India Company.
Unknown date	Triton	Schooner		Bombay	India	For Bombay Pilot Service.
Unknown date	Valk	Sixth rate	Peter Edwards	Amsterdam	Dutch Republic	For Dutch Republic Navy.
Unknown date	Wolfe	Gallivat		Bombay	India	For British East India Company.
Unknown date	Name unknown	Merchantman			Kingdom of France	For private owner.
Unknown date	Name unknown	Merchantman		Liverpool	Great Britain	For private owner.
Unknown date	Name unknown	Merchantman			Ireland	For private owner.
Unknown date	Orione	Brig		Venice	Republic of Venice	For (Venice) Venetian Navy.
