= Kura =

Kura may refer to:

== Places ==
- Kura, Iran (disambiguation)
- Kura Island, Azerbaijan
- Kura, Nigeria, a Local Government Area of Kano State
- Kura (South Caucasus river), a river in Turkey, Georgia, and Azerbaijan
- Kura (Russia), a river in Russia
- Kura Test Range, a testing site in Kamchatka Krai, Russia

== People ==
- Kura Te Whiria Ensor (1925–2015), Māori fashion designer
- Kura (music producer) (born 1987), Portuguese electro house music DJ and producer
- Kura (musician) (born c. 2003), American rapper, songwriter, engineer, and producer.
- Anne Kura (born 1984), German politician

== Other uses ==
- Eclipse Kura, an interoperability testing open source project for M2M applications
- Kuhl's lorikeet, a bird
- Kura (company), formerly Response, a contact centre company in Glasgow
- Kura (film), a 1995 Japanese film
- Kura Kaupapa Māori, Māori language immersion schools in New Zealand
- Kura Sushi, a sushi restaurant chain in Japan
- Kura (saddle), a Japanese saddle
- Kura (storehouse), a traditional Japanese storehouse
- Kura (deity), a god from 3rd millennium Ebla
- 'Kura, a TV show set in Papakura, Aotearoa/New Zealand
- Kūra (administrative division), territorial demarcations into which Al-Andalus was divided
- Te Kura Kaupapa Māori o Te Koutu or The Kura, school in Rotorua, New Zealand

== See also ==
- Kur River (disambiguation)
