= List of shipwrecks in October 1827 =

The list of shipwrecks in October 1827 includes some ships sunk, wrecked or otherwise lost during October 1827.

== 1 October ==
List of shipwrecks: 1 October 1827
Ship	State	Description
Calypso	United Kingdom	The ship was in collision with Recovery (United Kingdom) in the North Sea off the coast of Essex and sank. Her crew were rescued. She was on a voyage from North Shields, County Durham to London.

== 3 October ==
List of shipwrecks: 3 October 1827
Ship	State	Description
Governor Sorell	(United Kingdom of Great Britain and Ireland) New South Wales	The schooner was wrecked off Betsey Island, Van Diemen's Land, Her crew survived.

== 5 October ==
List of shipwrecks: 5 October 1827
Ship	State	Description
Der Yung Ioann (Дер Юнг Иоанн, 'Der jung Johan')	Imperial Russian Navy	The transport ship was driven ashore and wrecked at Kihnu in the Gulf of Riga. Her crew were rescued.

== 9 October ==
List of shipwrecks: 9 October 1827
Ship	State	Description
Mary	United Kingdom	The ship foundered off the Isle of May. Her crew survived. She was on a voyage from Sunderland, County Durham to the Moray Firth.

== 10 October ==
List of shipwrecks: 10 October 1827
Ship	State	Description
Barclay	United Kingdom	The ship was driven ashore and wrecked at Great Yarmouth, Norfolk.
Happy Return	United Kingdom	The ship was driven ashore and then sank at Lymington, Hampshire with the loss of all hands and seven passengers. She was on a voyage from Penzance, Cornwall to London. Happy Return was refloated on 4 November and taken in to Cowes, Isle of Wight.
Lord Duncan	United Kingdom	The brig was driven ashore and wrecked at Lowestoft, Suffolk. Her crew were rescued by rocket apparatus.

== 11 October ==
List of shipwrecks: 11 October 1827
Ship	State	Description
Devonshire	United Kingdom	The ship was wrecked at Holyhead, Anglesey. She was on a voyage from Dublin to Liverpool, Lancashire.
Nancy	United Kingdom	The collier was driven ashore and damaged south of Staithes, Yorkshire. Her crew were rescued. She was later refloated and towed in to Whitby, Yorkshire.

== 13 October ==
List of shipwrecks: 13 October 1827
Ship	State	Description
Dove	United Kingdom	The sloop was driven ashore and wrecked at the mouth of the River Tees.
Weddle	United Kingdom	The ship foundered in the North Sea. Her crew were rescued by a Dutch smack.

== 14 October ==
List of shipwrecks: 14 October 1827
Ship	State	Description
Echo	United Kingdom	The ship departed from Saint John, New Brunswick, British North America for Liverpool, Lancashire. No further trace, presumed foundered with the loss of all hands.

== 15 October ==
List of shipwrecks: 15 October 1827
Ship	State	Description
Richard	United Kingdom	The sloop was wrecked near Whitehaven, Cumberland. She was on a voyage from Ballycastle, County Antrim to Liverpool, Lancashire.

== 16 October ==
List of shipwrecks: 16 October 1827
Ship	State	Description
Asia	Hamburg	The ship was driven ashore and wrecked on Luzon, Spanish East Indies. She was on a voyage from Manila, Spanish East Indies to China.
Betsey	United Kingdom	The ship departed from Quebec City, Lower Canada, British North America for Tralee, County Kerry. Her logbook and register were subsequently recovered in 1829 at "Itamainron", Labrador, British North America, along with the skeletons of six crew members.
Brothers	United Kingdom	The ship sprang a leak and foundered in the Irish Sea off the Calf of Man, Isle of Man. She was on a voyage from Ardglass, County Down to Beaumaris, Anglesey.

== 20 October ==
List of shipwrecks: 20 October 1827
Ship	State	Description
Catharina Elizabeth	Denmark	The ship departed from Horsens for "Wyburg". No further trace, presumed foundered with the loss of all hands.
Chase	United States	The ship caught fire in the English Channel and was scuttled off the Brake Sand.
Crisham and Margaret	United Kingdom	The ship departed from Newcastle upon Tyne, Northumberland for Leith, Lothian. No further trace, presumed foundered in the North Sea with the loss of all hands.
Ihsania	Ottoman Navy	Greek War of Independence, Battle of Navarino: The frigate exploded during a gunnery duel with the frigate Sirène (French Navy) in Navarino Bay.
Ghiuh Rewan	Ottoman Navy	Greek War of Independence, Battle of Navarino: The ship-of-the-line was destroyed by gunfire during combat with the ship-of-the-line Breslau (French Navy) and other ships of the French Navy, Royal Navy, and Imperial Russian Navy in Navarino Bay.
Guerrière	(Ottoman Empire) Egyptian Navy	Greek War of Independence, Battle of Navarino: The frigate was reduced to a burning wreck by gunfire from the ships-of-the-line HMS Asia (Royal Navy) and Azov (Imperial Russian Navy) in Navarino Bay.
No. 16	Imperial Russian Navy	The transport ship ran aground and was wrecked at the roadstead of Sveaborg.

== 21 October ==
List of shipwrecks: 21 October 1827
Ship	State	Description
Broom	United Kingdom	The ship was wrecked at sea whilst on a voyage from Saint John, New Brunswick, British North America to Glasgow, Renfrewshire. Her twenty crew were rescued on 23 October by Henri (France).
Hebe	United Kingdom	The ship departed from Jersey, Channel Islands for Wivenhoe, Essex. No further trace, presumed foundered with the loss of all hands.

== 22 October ==
List of shipwrecks: 22 October 1827
Ship	State	Description
Bridget	United Kingdom	The ship was wrecked on the North Bull, in the Irish Sea. Her crew were rescued. She was on a voyage from Newry, County Antrim to Whitehaven, Cumberland.
Fanny	(United Kingdom of Great Britain and Ireland) British North America	The ship was lost off Cape Canso, Nova Scotia. Her crew were rescued. She was on a voyage from Halifax, Nova Scotia to Quebec City, Lower Canada.
Favourite	United Kingdom	The ship was driven ashore and wrecked at Sunderland, County Durham. Her crew were rescued by the Sunderland Lifeboat.
Perceval	United Kingdom	The schooner was driven ashore and wrecked at Sunderland. Her crew were rescued.
Welvaart	Hamburg	The ship struck a sunken wreck at Cuxhaven, Duchy of Saxony and foundered. Her crew were rescued. She was on a voyage from Hamburg to Antwerp, Netherlands.

== 23 October ==
List of shipwrecks: 23 October 1827
Ship	State	Description
Heureux Décidé	France	The ship was wrecked near Camaret-sur-Mer, Finistère.
Hoffnung	flag unknown	The ship struck a sandbank and was consequently beached at "Ancrum". She was on a voyage from "Ludwisthorn" to London, United Kingdom. Hoffnung was refloated on 16 November and taken in to Kronstadt, Russia.

== 25 October ==
List of shipwrecks: 25 October 1827
Ship	State	Description
Johanna Catharina	Netherlands	The ship was driven ashore on Bornholm, Denmark, where she was wrecked two days later. She was on a voyage from Riga, Russia to Schiedam, South Holland.

== 26 October ==
List of shipwrecks: 26 October 1827
Ship	State	Description
Elizabeth	United Kingdom	The schooner foundered in the Irish Sea with some loss of life.
Elizabetha and Maria	United Kingdom	The ship sprang a leak and foundered in the Bristol Channel off Lynmouth, Devon.
Queen Charlotte	United Kingdom	The smack was run down and sunk in the North Sea off Lowestoft, Suffolk by Sylvan(United Kingdom). All on board were rescued.
Two Brothers	Hamburg	The ship was wrecked in the North Sea off Harwich, Essex, United Kingdom. Her crew survived. She was on a voyage from Hamburg to Málaga, Spain.
Union	United Kingdom	The ship was driven ashore at Workington, Cumberland.
Violet	United Kingdom	The ship was abandoned in the Atlantic Ocean. She was on a voyage from Liverpool, Lancashire to Newfoundland, British North America.
Wanderer	United Kingdom	The ship was abandoned in the Atlantic Ocean. Eleven survivors were rescued by Great Britain (United Kingdom). She was on a voyage from Quebec City, Lower Canada, British North America to Plymouth, Devon.

== 27 October ==
List of shipwrecks: 27 October 1827
Ship	State	Description
Janet and Mary	United Kingdom	The ship was wrecked on Eierland, North Holland, Netherlands. Her crew survived. She was on a voyage from Cardiff, Glamorgan to Bremen.
Susan	United Kingdom	The ship was abandoned in the Atlantic Ocean. She was on a voyage from Dublin to Newfoundland.

== 28 October ==
List of shipwrecks: 28 October 1827
Ship	State	Description
Elizabeth	United Kingdom	The schooner foundered in the Irish Sea off Milford Haven, Pembrokeshire. Five of her crew survived.
Hoffnung	Griefswald	The ship was wrecked at Sunderland, County Durham, United Kingdom. She was on a voyage from Griefswald to Sunderland.
Orpheus	United Kingdom	The ship was wrecked on the coast of South America. Survivors were rescued by HMS Cadmus (Royal Navy).
Renown	United Kingdom	The ship was lost on the Salt Scarrs, in the North Sea off the coast of Yorkshire.

== 29 October ==
List of shipwrecks: 29 October 1827
Ship	State	Description
Janet and Marie	United Kingdom	The ship ran aground and sank off Eierland, North Holland, Netherlands. Her crew were rescued. She was on a voyage from Cardiff, Glamorgan to Bremen.
Susan	United Kingdom	The ship was wrecked on the Seven Stones Reef with the loss of a crew member. She was on a voyage from Matanzas, Cuba to Hamburg. Survivors were rescued by Tresco pilot boat Hope (United Kingdom). According to other sources she was the Susanna (United States) of Boston.
Union	United Kingdom	The ship was driven ashore at Memel, Prussia. She was subsequently wrecked on 10 December.

== 30 October ==
List of shipwrecks: 30 October 1827
Ship	State	Description
Fanny	United Kingdom	The ship was wrecked on the Haisborough Sands, in the North Sea off the coast of Norfolk.
Irresistible	Greece	The steamship was destroyed by fire in the River Thames.
Union	United Kingdom	The ship was driven ashore at Memel, Prussia. Her crew were rescued.
Vrouw Anna	Netherlands	The ship was driven ashore and wrecked near Cromer, Norfolk. She was on a voyage from Stockton-on-Tees, County Durham, United Kingdom to Rotterdam, South Holland.

== 31 October ==
List of shipwrecks: 31 October 1827
Ship	State	Description
Amphion	Sweden	The brig foundered in the North Sea off The Maze. Her crew were rescued. She was on a voyage from Havre de Grâce, Seine-Inférieure, France to Jakobstad.
Eclipse	United Kingdom	The ship was driven ashore at Ostend, West Flanders, Netherlands. Her crew were rescued. She was on a voyage from Dover, Kent to Ostend.
Favorite	United Kingdom	The ship was driven ashore and wrecked on Stronsay, Orkney Islands. She was on a voyage from Jakobstad, Sweden to liverpool, Lancashire.
Harmony	Netherlands	The ship was driven ashore and wrecked at Ostend. She was on a voyagefrom Dordrecht, South Holland to Marennes, Charente-Maritime, France.
Memel	Prussia	The ship was wrecked at Sarkau. Her crew were rescued. She was on a voyage from Calais, France to Memel.
Venus	United Kingdom	The ship was driven ashore and wrecked at Wells-next-the-Sea, Norfolk.
Vigilante	(Denmark) Duchy of Schleswig	The ship was driven ashore and wrecked at North Somercotes, Lincolnshire, United Kingdom with the loss of all hands. She was on a voyage from Neustadt in Holstein to Hull, Yorkshire.
Vrow Christina	Kingdom of Hanover	The ship foundered on the Haaks Sandbank, in the North Sea off Texel, North Holland, Netherlands. She was on a voyage from Hull, Yorkshire, United Kingdom to Emden.
Vrow Helena	Kingdom of Hanover	The ship foundered in the North Sea off Texel. She was on a voyage from Hull to Leer.

== Unknown date ==
List of shipwrecks: Unknown date in October 1827
Ship	State	Description
David	United Kingdom	The ship was wrecked on Anticosti Island, Quebec City, Lower Canada, British North America before 15 October.
Eliza	United Kingdom	The ship departed from Sunderland, County Durham for Spalding, Lincolnshire. No further trace presumed foundered in the North Sea with the loss of all hands.
Fortune	United Kingdom	The ship foundered in The Wash off King's Lynn, Norfolk.
Isabella	United Kingdom	The ship was abandoned in the Atlantic Ocean. Her crew were rescued by Wellwood (United Kingdom). She was on a voyage from Liverpool, Lancashire to New York, United States.
Latona	Stettin	The ship foundered off Cape St. Vincent, Portugal. She was on a voyage from Marseille, Bouches-du-Rhône, France to Stettin.
Mary	United Kingdom	The ship was lost off Carlingford, County Louth. She was on a voyage from Liverpool to Newcastle upon Tyne, Northumberland.
Olympic	France	The ship was wrecked on the coast of Africa in late October. About 300 people were rescued. She was on a voyage from Havre de Grâce, Seine-Inférieure to Montevideo, Uruguay.
Susan	United Kingdom	The ship was wrecked in the Atlantic Ocean. Her crew were rescued on 29 October by Urania (Netherlands). She was on a voyage from Dublin to Newfoundland, British North America.
Union	United Kingdom	The ship departed from Sunderland for Wisbech, Cambridgeshire. No further trace, presumed foundered in the North Sea with the loss of all hands.
25 de Agosto	Imperial Brazilian Navy	The Brig of War was lost near Colonia del Sacramento, Uruguay with the loss of most of her crew.
