= Royal Bounty (ship) =

Several vessels have been named Royal Bounty:

- Royal Bounty (1768 ship), of 250 or 350 tons (bm), was launched in 1744 or 1749 in America. She was sailing as a Greenland whaler when the Americans captured her in 1777 and the British re-captured her. She was transporting American prisoners from Halifax, Nova Scotia to Newport, Rhode Island when in January 1778 the prisoners rose up and captured her. They took her into Marblehead, Massachusetts, where she was condemned in prize.
- Royal Bounty (1785 ship) was launched in South Carolina in 1770, probably as George and Sarah. Her owners changed her name to Royal Bounty circa 1785. As Royal Bounty she sailed out of Leith, going on annual whale hunting voyages to the northern whale fishery. She was wrecked in 1819 on her 35th such voyage.
- Royal Bounty (1811 ship) was a British merchantman that first appeared in Lloyd's Register (LR) and in the Register of Shipping (RS) in 1811. A United States privateer captured and burnt her in 1812.
