= Affronteur-class lugger =

Class overview
- Name: Affronteur class
- Operators: French Navy; Royal Navy
- In commission: 1795–1807
- Planned: 2
- Completed: 2
- Retired: 2

General characteristics as built
- Type: Lugger
- Complement: 87–120
- Armament: 16 × 6-pounder guns

The Affronteur class consisted of two 16-gun luggers that Michel Colin-Olivier laid down at Dieppe in August 1794 and that he launched in 1795 for the French Navy. The two vessels took part in the Expédition d'Irlande in 1796–1797. The Royal Navy captured both vessels in 1803 in separate actions. The Royal Navy took Affronteur into service as HMS Caroline in 1804. She patrolled the Irish Sea until she was broken up in 1807. Vautour was not taken into British service.

== Description ==
The naval architect behind the Affronteur-class design is unknown but Winfield & Roberts suggest that the architect was probably Pierre-Alexandre-Laurent Forfait. The two vessels mounted sixteen 6-pounder (2.7 kg) guns and had a complement of 87–120 officers and ratings.

== Ships in class ==
Affronteur class
Name	Builder	Laid down	Launched	Commissioned	Fate
Affronteur	Michel Colin-Olivier, Dieppe, France	1794	18 July 1795	November 1975	Captured by Royal Navy 1803, became Caroline in 1804, and was broken up in 1807
Vautour	Michel Colin-Olivier, Dieppe, France	1794	August 1795	November 1795	Captured by Royal Navy 1803

== Construction and career ==
Michel Colin-Olivier constructed two luggers in 1794 Dieppe and launched then in November 1795. Both participated in the Expédition d'Irlande in 1796–1797.

On 18 May 1803, HMS Doris captured Affronteur off Ushant. She came into British service on 14 September 1804 as HMS Caroline. There the vessel was measured at 158 tons burthen and armed with twelve 12-pounder (5.4 kg) carronades and two 6-pounder guns. The lugger was re-rated as a gun-brig in British service. Caroline was deployed in the Irish Sea and taken out of service on 6 October 1807. The gun-brig was then broken up.

HMS Boadicea captured Vautour on 25 November 1803 off Cape Finisterre while Vautour was returning from Santo Domingo. The Royal Navy did not take her into British service.
