= Kur River, Russia =

There are several rivers named Kur in Russia:

- Kur River (Kursk Oblast), in the Dnieper basin
- Kur River (Khabarovsk Krai), in the Amur River basin

== See also ==
- Kura River (disambiguation)
