= List of shipwrecks in March 1834 =

The list of shipwrecks in March 1834 includes ships sunk, foundered, wrecked, grounded or otherwise lost during March 1834.

== 1 March ==
List of shipwrecks: 1 March 1834
Ship	State	Description
Isabella	United Kingdom	The ship was wrecked at Kirk Santon Head, Isle of Man with the loss of two of her crew. She was on a voyage from Liverpool, Lancashire to Glasgow, Renfrewshire.
Matthews	United Kingdom	The ship was wrecked in Calf Sound, Isle of Man. Her crew were rescued. She was on a voyage from Liverpool to an Irish port.
Robert Russell	United Kingdom	The ship was wrecked on Grand Bahama, Bahamas. She was on a voyage from New Orleans, Louisiana, United States to Liverpool.
Water Witch	United Kingdom	The ship was driven ashore in Carnarvon Bay. Her crew were rescued. She was on a voyage from Glandore, County Cork to Liverpool.

== 2 March ==
List of shipwrecks: 2 March 1834
Ship	State	Description
George	United Kingdom	The ship was driven ashore and wrecked near Wick, Caithness. She was on a voyage from London to Wick.

== 3 March ==
List of shipwrecks: 3 March 1834
Ship	State	Description
Brothers	United Kingdom	The ship foundered in the English Channel 3 leagues (9 nautical miles (17 km)) off The Needles, Isle of Wight.

== 4 March ==
List of shipwrecks: 4 March 1834
Ship	State	Description
Little Liz	United Kingdom	The ship ran agrounded on the Brazil Bank, in Liverpool Bay. Her crew were rescued by Magazine (United Kingdom). She was on a voyage from Sierra Leone to Liverpool, Lancashire. Little Liz was refloated on 9 March and taken in to Liverpool.
Minerva	United Kingdom	The ship was driven ashore at Littlehampton, Sussex.
William Penn	United States	The steamboat caught fire and was beached at Philadelphia, Pennsylvania with the loss of five lives. She was carrying 120 passengers. William Penn was on a voyage from New Castle, Pennsylvania to Philadelphia.

== 5 March ==
List of shipwrecks: 5 March 1834
Ship	State	Description
Confiance	France	The whaler was wrecked on the Costa Imperial, Chile. Her crew were rescued.
Shannon	United Kingdom	The ship was driven ashore near Greystones, County Wicklow. She was on a voyage from Whitehaven, Cumberland to Dublin.
Star	United Kingdom	The schooner foundered in Hoy Sound with the loss of all but one of her crew. She was on a voyage from Wick, Caithness to Bristol, Gloucestershire.

== 6 March ==
List of shipwrecks: 6 March 1834
Ship	State	Description
Charlotte Kerr	United Kingdom	The ship was driven ashore and wrecked on South Uist, Outer Hebrides. Her crew were rescued. She was on a voyage from the Clyde to Grenada.
Eagle	United Kingdom	The ship was wrecked in St Brides Bay. Her crew were rescued. She was on a voyage from Liverpool, Lancashire to Galway.

== 7 March ==
List of shipwrecks: 7 March 1834
Ship	State	Description
Confidence	United Kingdom	The ship was driven ashore and wrecked on Tiree, Inner Hebrides, She was on a voyage from the Clyde to Haiti.
Louisa	Lübeck	The ship was driven ashore on "Mangen". She was on a voyage from Reval, Russia to Lübeck.
Mally	United Kingdom	The ship was wrecked in Loch Alsh near Point Knock. She was on a voyage from Runcorn, Cheshire to Balisadare, County Sligo
Mary Ann	(United Kingdom of Great Britain and Ireland) New South Wales	The cutter was driven ashore and wrecked at Newcastle. Her crew were rescued.
Sea Nymph	United Kingdom	The ship was driven ashore at "Lobbe". She was on a voyage from Hamburg to a North Sea port in the United Kingdom.

== 8 March ==
List of shipwrecks: 8 March 1834
Ship	State	Description
Colchester	United Kingdom	The ship foundered off "Froomby", British North America.

== 9 March ==
List of shipwrecks: 9 March 1834
Ship	State	Description
Belford	United Kingdom	The ship foundered in the North Sea off North Shields, County Durham. Her crew were rescued. She was on a voyage from Newcastle upon Tyne, Northumberland to Dundee, Forfarshire.
Othmarschen	flag unknown	The ship was driven ashore near "Robsnout", Jutland. She was on a voyage from Messina, Sicily to a Baltic port.
Scotia	United Kingdom	The ship was wrecked on Uist, Outer Hebrides. She was on a voyage from the Clyde to Westport, County Mayo.

== 10 March ==
List of shipwrecks: 10 March 1834
Ship	State	Description
Brothers	United Kingdom	The ship was wrecked on the coast of Jutland. Her crew were rescued. She was on a voyage from Sunderland, County Durham to Stettin, Prussia.
Charles	Denmark	The ship was wrecked at "Wideroe", Sweden. Her crew were rescued. She was on a voyage from Messina, Sicily to Copenhagen.
Onkel	Danzig	The ship was wrecked on Skagen, Denmark with the loss of all hands. She was on a voyage from Alicante, Spain to Danzig.

== 11 March ==
List of shipwrecks: 11 March 1834
Ship	State	Description
Ann	United Kingdom	The ship was wrecked at Barbuda. She was on a voyage from Liverpool, Lancashire to Saint Thomas, Virgin Islands.
Manone	Hamburg	The ship was wrecked near "Neuvitas". She was on a voyage from Hamburg to Havana, Cuba.

== 12 March ==
List of shipwrecks: 12 March 1834
Ship	State	Description
King George	United Kingdom	The ship was wrecked at Faial, Azores, Portugal. Her crew were rescued. She was on a voyage from Africa to the United Kingdom.
Triton	United Kingdom	The ship was wrecked near Clare, Ireland. She was on a voyage from "Cleri" to Liverpool, Lancashire.

== 15 March ==
List of shipwrecks: 15 March 1834
Ship	State	Description
Nancy	United Kingdom	The sloop foundered in the North Sea off Montrose, Forfarshire.
Seaforth	United Kingdom	The ship was wrecked on the coast of Jamaica. She was on a voyage from Morant Bay to Port Maria, Jamaica.

== 16 March ==
List of shipwrecks: 16 March 1834
Ship	State	Description
Mary Ann	United Kingdom	The ship was driven ashore and wrecked near Danzig, Prussia. She was on a voyage from Saint Petersburg, Russia to London.
Ridley	United Kingdom	The ship was driven ashore near Danzig. She was on a voyage from Memel, Prussia to Hull, Yorkshire.

== 17 March ==
List of shipwrecks: 17 March 1834
Ship	State	Description
Fortuna	United Kingdom	The ship was wrecked on the east coast of Jutland, Denmark.
Haabet	Denmark	The ship ran aground and was wrecked at Swinemünde, Prussia. Her crew were rescued. She was on a voyage from Copenhagen to Swinemünde.

== 18 March ==
List of shipwrecks: 18 March 1834
Ship	State	Description
Nautilus	United Kingdom	The ship sprang a leak and was beached at Skegness, Lincolnshire.
Romney	United Kingdom	The brig foundered off Urbana. She was on a voyage from Fredriksberg, Sweden to Miramichi, New Brunswick, British North America.

== 19 March ==
List of shipwrecks: 19 March 1834
Ship	State	Description
Fama	United Kingdom	The ship was driven ashore at Thisted, Denmark. Her crew were rescued. She was on a voyage from Dundee, Forfarshire to a Baltic port.

== 20 March ==
List of shipwrecks: 20 March 1834
Ship	State	Description
Brunette	United Kingdom	The ship was driven ashore on Texel, North Holland, Netherlands.
Henrietta	Netherlands	The ship was driven ashore or Texel.
Virginia	Kingdom of Sardinia	The ship was wrecked near "Catali". She was on a voyage from Genoa to Constantinople, Ottoman Empire.

== 23 March ==
List of shipwrecks: 23 March 1834
Ship	State	Description
Adventure	United Kingdom	The ship foundered in the North Sea off the mouth of the Humber.
Eliza	United Kingdom	The ship was wrecked on the West Hoyke Bank, in Liverpool Bay, with the loss of five of her seven passengers. She was on a voyage from the Isle of Man to Liverpool, Lancashire.
Gem	United States	The ship was driven ashore at Nantucket, Massachusetts. She was on a voyage from Philadelphia, Pennsylvania to Saint John, New Brunswick, British North America.

== 24 March ==
List of shipwrecks: 24 March 1834
Ship	State	Description
Glasgow Merchant	United Kingdom	The ship was driven ashore at Caister-on-Sea, Norfolk. Her crew were rescued. She was on a voyage from Glasgow, Renfrewshire to Rotterdam, South Holland, Netherlands.

== 25 March ==
List of shipwrecks: 25 March 1834
Ship	State	Description
Hector	France	The ship sprang a leak and foundered. She was on a voyage from Granville, Manche to Saint Pierre.
No. 1	Imperial Russian Navy	The transport ship caught fire and was scuttled at Izmail.

== 27 March ==
List of shipwrecks: 27 March 1834
Ship	State	Description
Louisa Augusta	Denmark	The ship was wrecked on the Long Sand, in the North Sea off the coast of Essex, United Kingdom. Her crew were rescued. She was on a voyage from Copenhagen to the Isle of Man.

== 28 March ==
List of shipwrecks: 28 March 1834
Ship	State	Description
Actif	France	The steamship was wrecked near Audresselles, Pas-de-Calais. She was on a voyage from Havre de Grâce, Seine-Inférieure to Rotterdam, South Holland, Netherlands.
Helen	United Kingdom	The ship was driven ashore in Sheephaven Bay. Her crew were rescued. She was on a voyage from Greenock, Renfrewshire to Demerara.
Lady D'Urban	(United Kingdom of Great Britain and Ireland) Antigua	The schooner was wrecked at Saint Lucia.
Royal Sovereign	United Kingdom	The ship was driven ashore in Caernarvon Bay. Her crew were rescued. She was on a voyage from Arklow, County Wicklow to Liverpool, Lancashire.

== 29 March ==
List of shipwrecks: 29 March 1834
Ship	State	Description
Æolus	Wismar	The ship foundered in the Kattegat off "Grimstadt", Sweden. Her crew were rescued. She was on a voyage from Wismar to Hull, Yorkshire, United Kingdom
Billow	(United Kingdom of Great Britain and Ireland) British North America	The schooner was sunk by ice. Her crew were rescued.
Eendraght	Netherlands	The smack was lost off "Oddoe", Norway.
Sylvan (Syloan)	United Kingdom	The brig was wrecked in the Kattegat. Her crew were rescued, She was on a voyage from Newcastle upon Tyne to Wismar.

== 30 March ==
List of shipwrecks: 30 March 1834
Ship	State	Description
Julia	(United Kingdom of Great Britain and Ireland) British North America	The schooner was sunk by ice off Harbour Grace, Newfoundland. Her crew were rescued.

== 31 March ==
List of shipwrecks: 31 March 1834
Ship	State	Description
Chatham	United Kingdom	The Thames barge capsized and sank in the North Sea 2 nautical miles (3.7 km) east of Whitstable, Kent. Her crew were rescued. She was on a voyage from Rye, Sussex to London.
Mexico	Spain	The ship was wrecked at Galwa Point. Her crew were rescued. She was on a voyage from Cádiz ro Cartagena.

== Unknown date ==
List of shipwrecks: Unknown date in March 1834
Ship	State	Description
Ann	(United Kingdom of Great Britain and Ireland) New South Wales	The schooner was wrecked north of "Nobby's Island".
Elizabeth	United Kingdom	The ship was driven ashore on the Swedish coast before 14 March. She was on a voyage from Saint Petersburg, Russia to London.
Ellen	United States	The ship departed from Charleston, South Carolina for Kronstadt, Russia. No further trace, presumed lost with all hands.
Eugine	France	The ship was wrecked in Catalan Bay.
Gustave	France	The ship was wrecked in the "Almandes". She was on a voyage from Bordeaux, Gironde to Goree Island, South Holland, Netherlands.
Holland	(United Kingdom of Great Britain and Ireland) Jamaica	The sloop was wrecked on the coast of Jamaica.
Neptune	Netherlands	The ship foundered off the coast of Finistère, France on or before 8 March.
New Jersey	United Kingdom	The ship was wrecked whilst on a voyage from Gibraltar to China.
Reliance	United Kingdom	The schooner was wrecked on a shoal off Singapore in mid-March.
Stonehouse	United Kingdom	The ship was sunk on the North Bank, in Liverpool Bay. Her crew were rescued. She was on a voyage from Plymouth, Devon to Liverpool, Lancashire.
Two Brothers	United Kingdom	The ship struck the Wild-fire Rocks, in the North Sea off Scoughall, Lothian and was consequently beached. She was on a voyage from King's Lynn to Leith, Lothian.
Virginia	flag unknown	The ship was driven ashore on Fanø, Denmark. She was on a voyage from Genoa, Kingdom of Sardinia and Messina, Kingdom of the Two Sicilies to Hamburg.
Zephyr	United Kingdom	The ship ran aground and was wrecked off Cardiff, Glamorgan. She was on a voyage from Cardiff to Liverpool.
