= Kura River =

Kura River (or Cyrus River) may refer to following rivers:

- Kura (South Caucasus river), a major international river that drains into the Caspian Sea
- Kura (Russia), a river in Russia that drains into the Nogai Steppe

== See also ==
- Kor River (also Kur River; Persian: رود کر) located in the Fars Province of Iran
- Kura (disambiguation)
