= French gun vessel Bombarde (1800 ship) =

History

France
- Name: Bombarde, or #69
- Launched: c.1800
- Captured: 10 January 1801

General characteristics
- Tons burthen: 9657/94 (bm)
- Length: 68 ft 1 1/2 in (20.8 m) (gundeck)
- Beam: 13 ft 1 1/2 in (4.0 m)
- Draught: 4 ft 10 in (1.5 m)
- Sail plan: Lugger
- Complement: 30
- Armament: 1 × 24-pounder gun + 1 × 13-inch mortar + 4 swivel guns

The French gun vessel Bombarde was probably built around 1800, HMS Boadicea captured her in January 1801.

== Design ==
The "Bombardes", or "Bateaux-bombardiers", were 50-tonne boats designed by Pierre-Alexandre Forfait and Joseph Muskein and built by engineers such as Fouache. They were originally gunboats ("bateaux-canonniers"), modified during their construction to carry heavy mortars. Such ships were launched from 1797 to 1802. They were armed with a 12-inch mortar and propelled by three masts and 14 lines of rowers.

After N°69 was captured, the British described her as "curiously constructed", in that she was essentially a shallow-draft, lugger-rigged raft. (Note: French sources give her the number "73".) She could readily carry 150 soldiers. Furthermore, her gangways were broad, fortified, and built over ammunition cases. She was one of some 200 vessels that the French had massed at Havre for the planned invasion of Britain, and which had been sitting there for two years.

== Career ==
On 10 January 1801, (Note: French sources say 8 January.) Boadicea captured Bombarde, which had been sailing from Havre to Brest. Bombarde was at Chenal du Four, under the command of Ensign Debegrue, when three boats captured her. Bombarde arrived in Plymouth six days later.

She was advertised for sale in April 1801. The description refers to her as being French-built, square-sterned, and almost new.
