= French lugger Affronteur =

History

France
- Name: Affronteur
- Builder: Dieppe naval dockyard
- Laid down: 1794
- Launched: 18 July 1795
- In service: November 1795
- Captured: 18 May 1803

United Kingdom
- Name: HMS Caroline
- Acquired: May 1803 by capture
- Fate: Possibly broken up 1807

General characteristics
- Class & type: Affronteur-class lugger
- Type: lugger, converted to brig
- Tons burthen: 15126/94, or 158 (bm)
- Length: 84 ft 2 1/4 in (25.66 m)
- Beam: 20 ft 7 1/2 in (6.29 m)
- Propulsion: Sails
- Complement: Affronteur: 92?; Caroline: 60?
- Armament: Affronteur: 14 × 9-pounder guns; Caroline: 12 × 12-pounder carronades + 2 × 6-pounder bow chasers

The French lugger Affronteur was launched in 1795 and in 1796-7 participated in the Expédition d'Irlande. In 1803, HMS Doris captured her and she subsequently served the Royal Navy either as a commissioned vessel or, more probably, as His Majesty's hired armed brig Caroline. In 1807 she was either broken up, or became a letter of marque.

== Design and French service ==
Affronteur was the name ship of her two-vessel class. Boadicea captured her sister ship Vautour in November 1803. The vessels were probably built to a design by Pierre-Alexandre-Laurent Forfait.

In 1796 she was under the command of Enseigne de vaisseau non entretenu Catelain. Between December 1796 and January 1797 she participated in the Expédition d'Irlande, Republican France's attempt to assist the outlawed Society of United Irishmen, a popular rebel Irish republican group, in their planned rebellion against British rule. Weather and events conspired to render the expedition ineffectual; most of the French vessels returned to France, having accomplished nothing. Between 23 September 1800 and 14 November 1801 Affronteur was at Brest, being refitted.

== Capture ==
On 18 May 1803, Doris, under the command of Captain Richard Harrison Pearson, captured the lugger Affronteur, off Ushant. Affronteur was armed with fourteen 9-pounder guns and had a crew of 92 men under the command of lieutenant de vaisseau M. Morce André Dutoya. Affronteur resisted capture in an engagement during which Doris suffered one man wounded, while Affronteur lost Dutoya and eight other men killed, and 14 men wounded, one of whom died shortly thereafter.

Affronteur had sailed to demand of Doris why she was in the area. The capture took place on the very day that Britain declared war, and before the news had reached France. The French complained that the British had struck, in effect, before declaring war. Histories also consider Lieutenant Dutoya the first casualty of the Napoleonic Wars, at least as they involved England.

Effronteur, a prize to Doris, was offered for sale at Plymouth on 30 September 1803.

== Service as Caroline ==
Affronteur became Caroline. This is something all authors agree on. All British authors also agree that she was of about 158 tons burthen (bm). There is, however, ambiguity in the accounts about whether Caroline was a lugger or a brig, and whether she was a vessel belonging to the Royal Navy or a hired vessel serving the Royal Navy under contract.

Norie agrees with Winfield that Affronteur became the hired lugger Caroline, which served the Royal Navy from 14 September 1804 to 26 October 1807. She was armed with twelve 12-pounder carronades and had a burthen of 156 tons. (Note: One National Archives document refers to Caroline as a 158 ton lugger, owned by Mr. John Hawker, hired and in service between 21 November 1804 and 24 September 1807. She is described as being armed with twelve 12-pounder carronades and having a crew of 52 men. A second document refers to her as a 158 ton lugger, in service from 14 September to 26 October 1807.) Confusingly, Colledge, Roche, and also Winfield report that Affronteur became HMS Caroline, which Colledge and Winfield describe as a brig of 14 guns. However, the National Maritime Museum lists Caroline as a hired brig.

A newspaper account in September 1804 reports from Plymouth that "... the Caroline, a beautiful lugger of 16 guns, late Affronteur, is now fitting as a hired armed lugger, to be taken into service." Winfield and the National Maritime Museum both report that Caroline was commissioned for the Irish Sea under Lieutenant J(ohn) Derby. (Note: Derby had a daughter, Caroline Elizabeth, who married in 1831. He may well have named her after his vessel. He himself appears never to have risen above the rank of lieutenant.) From that point on, all mentions of Caroline refer to her as a brig, and generally a hired brig.

The Naval Chronicle reported on 22 November 1804 that

"That beautiful Vessel the Caroline Brig, of 16 guns, and 60 men, is taken into the service, and it is supposed, when fitted for sea, will carry out dispatches for the West Indies, as she is so fast a sailer; she was the first French National Corvette taken in this war by the Doris".

This suggests that Caroline was converted from a lugger to a brig between September and November. The Naval Chronicle reported that on 16 December 1804, "Caroline, hired armed brig of 14 guns, Lieutenant Derby, sailed from Plymouth with a convoy." On 5 January 1805, "Caroline brig of 14 Guns, Lieutenant Derby" had arrived safely at Plymouth after having experienced "very terrible gales of Wind, but owing to her being so clever, tight, and well-found a vessel, she did not strain a spun-yarn. ... She is a beautiful, fast-sailing Vessel of her class." Three days later, Caroline was back in Plymouth from Milford Haven, having convoyed a very large, leaky South Sea whaler to Dartmouth. On 19 January Caroline sailed again.

Two days later, "His Majesty's hired armed brig Caroline, Lieutenant John Derby, Commander", captured Magdalena and Alida. (Note: A second class share of the prize money, that accruing to Lieutenant Derby, was worth £72 18s 9 3/4d; a sixth-class share, that of an ordinary seaman, was £2 4s 2 1/4d. The Flag officer of Derby's station received a share equal in value to half of Derby's share.) Then five months later, on 27 May, Derby and "His Majesty's Armed Brig Caroline" captured the Prussian smack Fortuna and her cargo. (Note: A petty officer's share of the prize money was worth £11 0s 4d; an able seaman's share was £4 10s 4d.)

On 9 March 1806, Caroline captured Zwey Freunden. (Note: A second-class share was worth £79 0s 9 3/4d; a sixth-class share was worth £2 0s 6 1/4d. The Flag officer again received a share equal in value to half that of Derby's share.) Lloyd's List credited the capture of Twee Vriends, Flercken, master, to the privateer Happy Return and the armed ship Caroline. They sent their captive into Dartmouth.

A week or so later, the armed ship Caroline sent into Plymouth Harmony, Poole, master, which had been sailing from Lisbon to Amsterdam. Then in late April, the armed brig Caroline and the privateer British Tar sent into Plymouth Catherine and Elanor, of Bremen, which had been sailing from Nantes to Altoona. However, Catherine and Elanor was liberated and left Plymouth on 30 June for her original destination.

On 19 May 1806 Caroline escorted with Queen Charlotte to Greenock.

At the end of November, Caroline sent into Plymouth the Danish vessel Elkin, Cornelius, master, which had been sailing from Havana to Tonningen.

== Fate ==
British Admiralty records have Caroline being broken up in 1807.

However, she may have become a privateer instead. On 24 November 1807, one month after the hired armed brig Caroline went off contract, the brig Caroline, of 155 tons, two 6-pounder guns and twelve 12-pounder carronades received a letter of marque. This brig had a crew of 60 under the command of Charles Campion Jones. On 16 April 1808, the Spanish privateer Prince of Austurias captured the privateer Caroline, of Plymouth, and sailing from Madeira. In the engagement Prince of Asturias killed Caroline's captain, lieutenant, and several crew members.
