= Ranger (1796 ship) =

History

Great Britain
- Name: Ranger
- Launched: 1789, The Netherlands
- Acquired: 1796 by purchase of a prize
- Captured: Captured and recaptured 1810
- Fate: Last mentioned in 1811

General characteristics
- Tons burthen: 432, or 461, or 464, or 469 (bm)
- Complement: 1798: 30; 1799: 20
- Armament: 1796: 12 × 6-pounder guns; 1798: 18 × 6&9-pounder guns; 1799: 14 × 6&18-pounder cannons + 2 swivel guns; 1799: 12 × 6-pounder guns + 2 × 12-pounder carronades

Ranger was built in the Netherlands, reportedly for the Dutch East India Company, and almost certainly under another name. She was take in prize in 1796. She made one voyage as an East Indiaman for the British East India Company (EIC). She then traded to the West Indies and the Mediterranean before becoming a transport. French frigates captured her in 1810. The Royal Navy recaptured her almost immediately and used her to transport prisoners from Isle de France (Mauritius) to France. She then disappears from online records.

== Career ==
Ranger first appeared in Lloyd's Register (LR) in 1796.

Year	Master	Owner	Trade	Source & note
1796	Campbell	W. Boyd & Co.	London–East Indies	LR

Captain Patrick Campbell sailed from Portsmouth 11 August 1796, bound for Bengal. She reached Vizagapatam on 12 January 1797 and arrived at Calcutta on 11 February. Homeward bound, Ranger was at Diamond Harbour on 5 April 1797. Captain John Kingston Bythewood replaced Campbell on 24 April 1797 in command of Ranger. She reached the Cape of Good Hope on 29 July. A French privateer captured Grenville Bay, J. Mann, master on 28 October. The captors abandoned their prize and her crew as the vessel was in great distress. Ranger rescued the crew and took them into Shannon. (Note: Grenville Bay, of 250 tons (bm), was launched at Stockton in 1783. She was on her way from Jamaica to London.) Ranger arrived at the River Shannon on 10 November, and the Downs on 15 January 1798.

Year	Master	Owner	Trade	Source & note
1798	Campbell; Ranny	W. Boyd & Co.	London–India; St Domingo	LR; good repair 1796

Captain Samuel Ranney acquired a letter of marque on 16 March 1798.

Year	Master	Owner	Trade	Source	
1799	Ranney; T.Gouch	Smith & Co.	W. Boyd & Co.	St Domingo; London–Smyrna	LR; good repair 1796

On 11 January 1799 Captain Thomas Gooch acquired a letter of marque on 11 January 1799.

Year	Master	Owner	Trade	Source
1800	Gouch; E.Grundy	W.Boyd	London–Smyrna	LR; good repair 1796
1801	E.Grundy	Smith & Co.	London–Gibraltar	LR; good repair 1796
1804	J.Couuts	Branford	London transport	LR; good repair 1796
1811	J.Coutts	Branford	London transport	LR; good repair 1796

== Fate ==
Ranger sailed from Gravesend on 26 May 1810, bound for the Cape of Good Hope (the Cape). She arrived at Table Bay on 10 June.

Three French frigates captured the transport Ranger as Ranger was carrying stores and provisions from the Cape to Isle of Bourbon. The capture occurred on 23 August.

On 4 September HMS Boadicea, Staunch, and Otter shared in the capture of Ranger. (Note: The prize money for a first-class share, such as a captain would receive, was £55 14s 11d; an ordinary seaman received 10s 7½d.)

On 17 June 1811, Ranger arrived at Plymouth. She had come as a cartel from Isle de France (Mauritius) (after the British had captured the island), and Morlaix. The British government chartered some a number of vessels as cartels to carry back to France the French troops that they had captured in these campaigns. The list mentioned one vessel, of unknown name, that too had at Morlaix.

Ranger's subsequent disposition is currently obscure as she disappeared from the registers. She may have been broken up, or have been sold only to reappear under another name. One plausible candidate is Catherine, but it would require original research to support or refute the conjecture.
