= Kirovsky District, Stavropol Krai =

Kirovsky District Кировский район (Russian)
- District
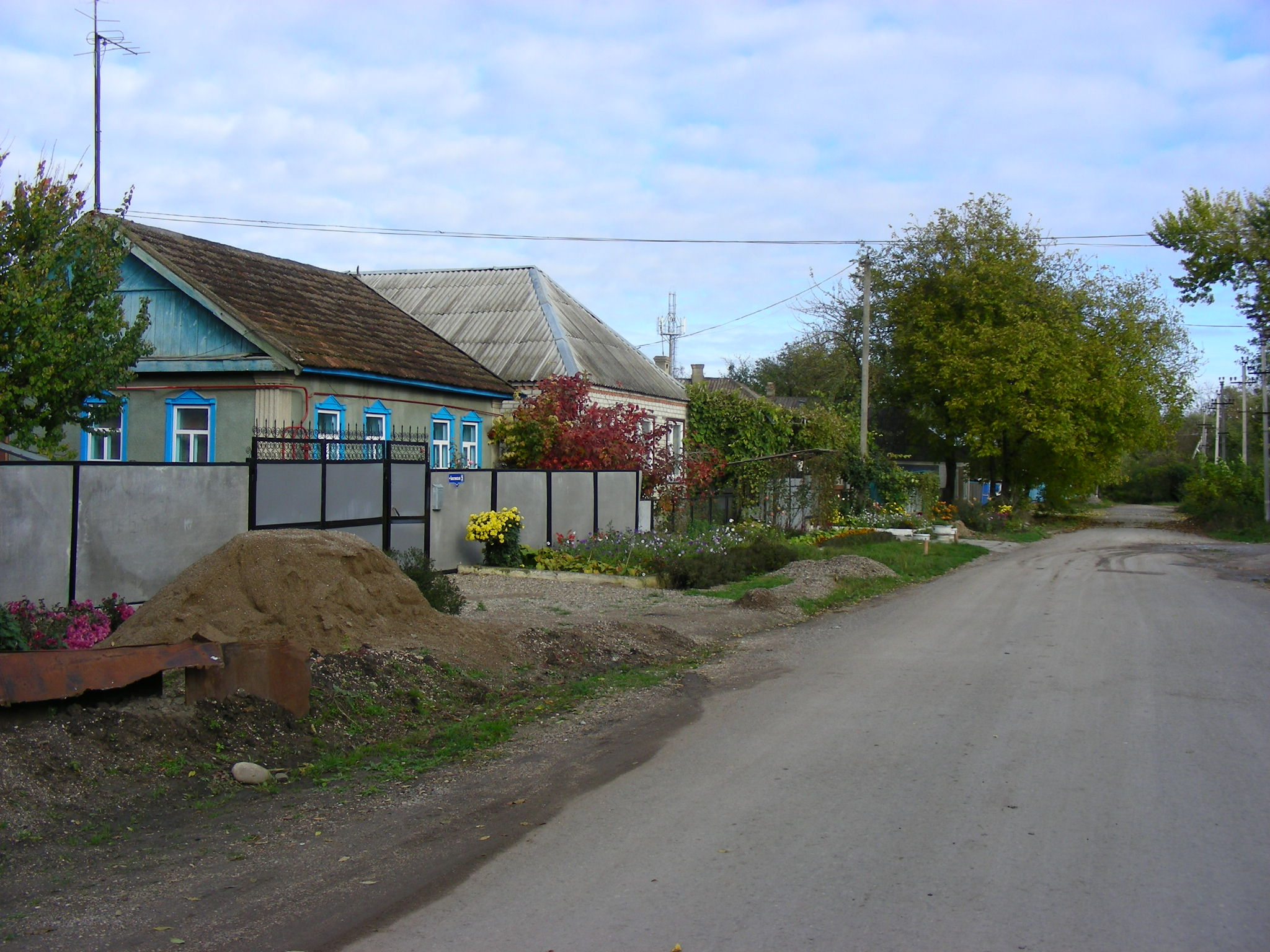
- Street scene, Zolskaya, Kirovsky District

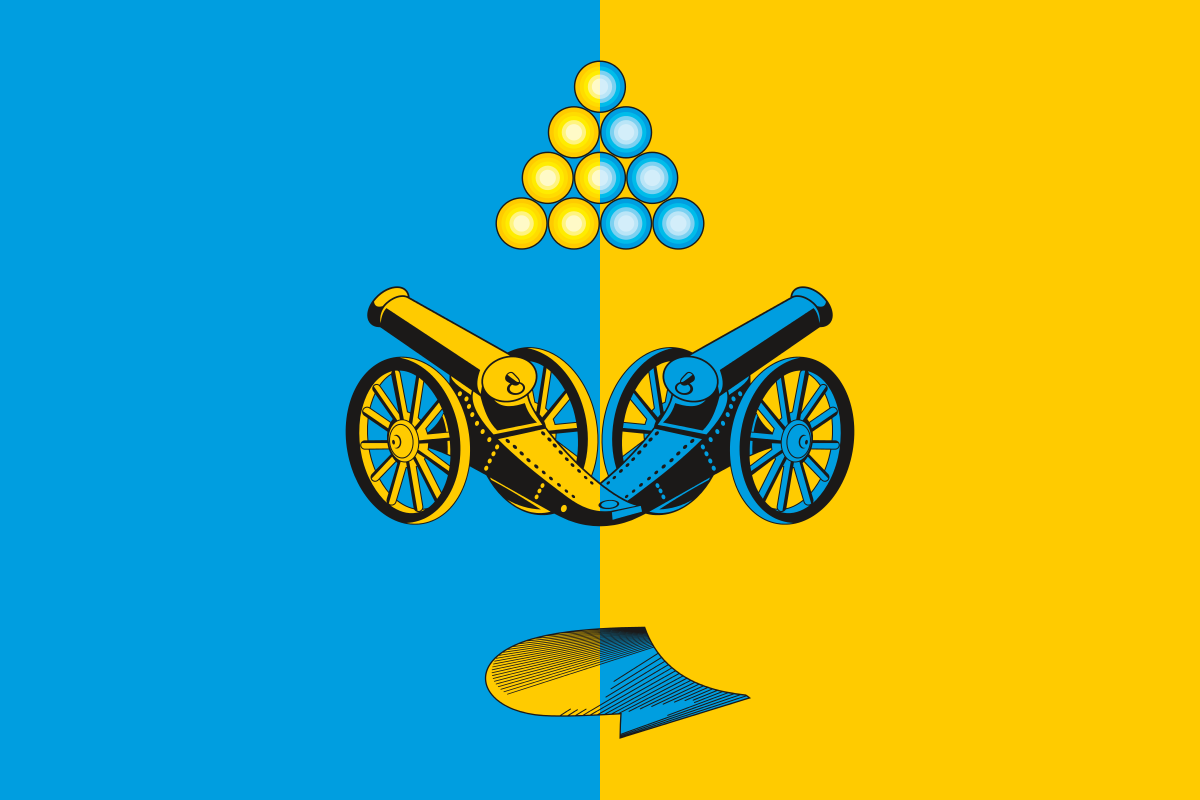
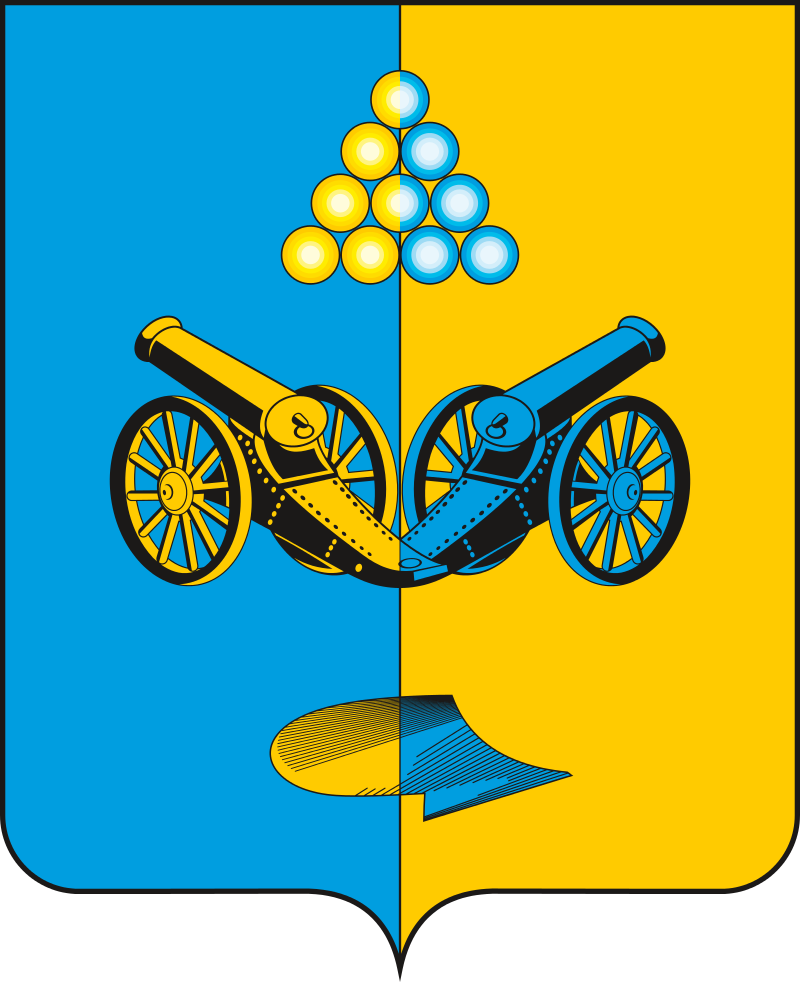
- Flag Coat of arms
- Location of Kirovsky District in Stavropol Krai
- Coordinates: 43°58′N 43°38′E
- Country: Russia
- Federal subject: Stavropol Krai
- Established: 1924
- Administrative center: Novopavlovsk

Area
  - Total: 1,386 km^{2} (535 sq mi)

Population (2010 Census)
  - Total: 71,723
  - Density: 51.75/km^{2} (134.0/sq mi)
  - Urban: 37.0%
  - Rural: 63.0%

Administrative structure
  - Administrative divisions: 1 Towns, 7 Selsoviets
  - Inhabited localities: 1 cities/towns, 22 rural localities

Municipal structure
  - Municipally incorporated as: Kirovsky Municipal District
  - Municipal divisions: 1 urban settlements, 9 rural settlements
- Time zone: UTC+3 (MSK)
- OKTMO ID: 07716000
- Website: http://www.akmrsk-portal.ru

Kirovsky District (Russian: Ки́ровский райо́н) is an administrative district (raion), one of the twenty-six in Stavropol Krai, Russia. Municipally, it is incorporated as Kirovsky Municipal District. It is located in the south of the krai. The area of the district is 1,386 square kilometers (535 sq mi). Its administrative center is the town of Novopavlovsk. Population: 71,723 (2010 census); 67,317 (2002 Census); 55,074 (1989 Census). The population of Novopavlovsk accounts for 37.0% of the district's total population.
