= HMS Utile (1799) =

Brig of the Royal Navy

History

France
- Name: Utile
- Builder: Bordeaux
- Launched: 1799
- Captured: April 1799

Great Britain
- Name: HMS Utile
- Acquired: 1799 by capture
- Commissioned: September 1801
- Fate: Foundered November 1801

General characteristics
- Tons burthen: c.250; 27888/94 (bm)
- Length: Overall:89 ft 6 in (27.3 m); Keel:74 ft 0 1/2 in (22.6 m)
- Beam: 26 ft 7 in (8.1 m)
- Depth of hold: 12 ft 10 in (3.9 m)
- Sail plan: Brig-sloop
- Complement: French:120; Royal Navy:76
- Armament: French:16 × 8-pounder long guns; Royal Navy:14 × 24-pounder carronades + 2 × 6-pounder chase guns

HMS Utile was the French 16-gun privateer brig-sloop Utile launched in 1799 that the Royal Navy captured in 1799 and took into service; she foundered in the Mediterranean in 1801.

Utile was launched in 1799 and fitted at Bordeaux.

On 1 April 1799, Boadicea captured the brig Utile. Utile was armed with sixteen 8-pounder guns, of which ten were brass. She had a crew of 120 men and was three weeks out of Bordeaux.

Boadicea sent Utile into Portsmouth, where she arrived on 11 April. She sat there until May to October 1801, when she underwent fitting. Commander Edward Jekyll Canes commissioned her in September 1801 for the Mediterranean.

Canes sailed from Portsmouth on the 20 October 1801 for the Mediterranean with details of the preliminaries of the peace treaty. Utile sailed from Gibraltar on 5 November with £27,000 for the payment of the garrison at Minorca. She was never seen again and was presumed to have foundered with all hands.
