= Queen Charlotte (1790 ship) =

History

Great Britain
- Operator: Hudson's Bay Company (1790–1800)
- Launched: 1790, The Thames
- Fate: Finally wrecked 10 December 1813

General characteristics
- Tons burthen: 152, or 157 (bm)
- Armament: 2 × 3-pounder guns

Queen Charlotte was built on the Thames in 1790. She made eight voyages for the Hudson's Bay Company (HBC) before it sold her in 1800. She then traded to South America and the Mediterranean. In 1803 her crew mutinied and turned her over to the French, who promptly handed her and them back to the British authorities, despite the two countries being at war. She then spent much of her career sailing between London and the Cape of Good Hope (CGH; the Cape). (Note: Although there is one mention of her having made a whaling voyage in 1808–1809, there is no corroborating evidence for that.) She was sailing for the Cape in October 1813 when a collision with another vessel resulted in Queen Charlotte being wrecked shortly thereafter.

== Career ==
Queen Charlotte spent the first decade of her career sailing for the HBC. during this time she made eight voyages between London and Hudson Bay, primarily to York Factory. Turner then took command of King George, another HBC ship.

Year	Master	Owner	Trade	Source & notes
1801	J.Turner; Andrews	HBC; Capt. & Co.	Hudson Bay	LR
1803	A.Andrews	Capt & Co.	Liverpool–Leghorn	Register of Shipping (RS)

In early 1804 Queen Charlotte, Andrews, master, was returning from Smyrna on her way to London when she put in at Gibraltar. There her crew took control of her and sailed to Cadiz where they turned themselves over to the French Navy. However, at Cadiz the captain of a French 74-gun, took vessel and crew into custody, turning them over to the British consul. The French also returned Queen Charlotte to Andrew's control.

Year	Master	Owner	Trade	Source & notes
1804	A.Andrews; Mounton	Capt.&Co.	Liverpool–Leghorn; London–Surinam	LR
1806	A. Carr	Wilkie	London–Surinam	LR
1806	Moresdon; A. Andrews	Wilkie & Co. Capt.& Co.	London–Surinam; London–Surinam; London–Cape of good Hope (CGH)	RS
1809	Andrews	J.Wilkie	London–CGH	LR
1809	A.Andrews	Capt&Co.	London–CGH	RS; damages repaired 1806
1810	A.Andrews	Capt&Co.	London–CGH	RS; damages repaired 1806 and small repairs 1809

Lloyd's List reported on 15 November 1811 that Queen Charlotte, Andrews, master, had lost an anchor and cable in Margate Roads.

Year	Master	Owner	Trade	Source & notes
1813	Andrews; Jackson	J.Wilkie	London–CGH	LR; several repairs

On 27 December 1812 Queen Charlotte sailed from Rio de Janeiro together with four three other British merchant vessels bound for Great Britain and under convoy by the schooner HMS Juniper. At 4°25′N 22°30′W one left the group, all of which, including Queen Charlotte, Jackson, master, were short of provisions. Queen Charlotte was bound for Greenock.

== Fate ==
Queen Charlotte collided on 20 October 1813 with the transport Phœbe and sank off Spithead. Queen Charlotte's mate drowned. She was on a voyage from London to the Cape of Good Hope. Queen Charlotte was raised from six fathoms (18 ft (5.5 m)) of water to 8 ft (2.4 m) feet in early December but a gale on 10 December broke up her decks and scattered her cargo. LR for 1814 carried the annotation "sunk" by her name.

== Post script ==
She may have been salvaged and become Queen Charlotte (1815 ship).
