= Queen Charlotte (1801 ship) =

History

United Kingdom
- Builder: Emsworth
- Launched: 1801
- Fate: Last listed 1820

General characteristics
- Tons burthen: 185, or 190 (bm)
- Complement: 25
- Armament: 1807:6 × 4-pounder guns + 4 × 12-pounder carronades; 1808: 14 × 12-pounder carronades + 6 swivel guns; 1814: 10 × 9-pounder guns

Queen Charlotte was built in Emsworth in 1801. She was a regular packet ship for the Post Office Packet Service, sailing out of Falmouth. She made several voyages across the Atlantic between late 1802 and 16 May 1805 when she was captured. She came back into British hands around 1806. The Post Office took her into temporary service between 1812 and 1817. In 1815, she was involved in a friendly fire incident. She then became a whaler off Peru in 1818. She remained in the Pacific Coast of South America until she was condemned there in 1820 as unseaworthy; she was last listed that same year. She may have been repaired and have continued to trade on the coast until 1822.

== Career ==
=== Packet ===
Queen Charlotte was launched in 1801. She was a regular packet and made several voyages across the Atlantic between late 1802 and 16 May 1805 when the French privateer Hirondelle captured her at 47°20′N 12°20′W after an engagement that lasted two hours. (Note: Her master was John Mudge. In 1807 he became master of a second Queen Charlotte. He and many of his crew drowned when this latter Queen Charlotte was wrecked in January 1814.) A report in Lloyd's List stated that a Spanish privateer had captured her after an engagement of 2½ hours and taken her into Vicero, near Passages. By the time Mudge surrendered, two of his carronades were out of action. Also, a shot had dismounted one of his three cannons on the engaging side.

=== Merchantman ===
Queen Charlotte came back into British hands and appeared in Lloyd's Register (LR) in 1807. She was mentioned in the press before that. For instance, on 19 May 1806 the armed ship Caroline, Lieutenant Darby, sailed with Queen Charlotte to Greenock as an escort.

Year	Master	Owner	Trade	Source
1807	M.Gardner	Newman	Liverpool–Newfoundland	LR
1808	Gardner; Long; C.J.Lye	Newman; Greve & Co.	Dartmouth–London; London–West Indies	LR

On 26 March 1808 Captain Charles John Lye acquired a letter of marque.

=== Packet ===
The Post Office service re-engaged Queen Charlotte as a temporary packet in 1812. William Kirkness was appointed master on 8 September 1812.

Year	Master	Owner	Trade	Source
1812	C.J.Lye; Kirkness	Greve & Co.	London–Surinam	LR

In November 1812 Queen Charlotte, Kirkness, master, was at Georgetown, Demerara when Kirkness observed a strange vessel cruising outside the harbour. He went ashore and informed Governor Hugh Lyle Carmichael that an American privateer was cruising outside the harbour. Carmichael had that morning received intelligence that the US privateer Rattlesnake and another privateer were on their way to intercept the fleet of merchantmen from Cork that was expected to arrive shortly. there were no Royal Navy vessels at Georgetown so Carmichael asked Kirkness to help.

Kirkness took on board a large body of troops and some volunteers from the local militia and sailed out. They sighted the two privateers as they left the port but the privateers, uncharacteristically, held back. They followed Queen Charlotte until she met the fleet, and then sailed away.

Queen Charlotte sailed from Demerara on 11 November and Martinique on 22 November. She arrived back at Falmouth on 31 December 1812.

On 19 January 1813 Queen Charlotte sailed for New York under a flag of truce. As it happened, she went no further than Bermuda. She was at Bermuda between 1 March and 15 April. She returned to Falmouth on 13 May.

On 17 March 1815 Captain William Kirkness sailed Queen Charlotte from Falmouth. She was at Madeira on 10–11 April, and arrived at Rio de Janeiro on 26 May. She left there on 18 June, and left Bahia on 2 July. She arrived back at Falmouth on 26 August.

On 21 January 1815 Queen Charlotte encountered HMS Harlequin at 36°59′N 37°9′W. By one account Queen Charlotte was on her way to Suriname; by another account, she was 20 days out of Guadeloupe on her way back to Falmouth. By mistake an engagement ensued in which Harlequin had her first lieutenant killed and a man wounded.

Captain Kirkness sailed from Falmouth on 22 March 1816. Queen Charlotte returned to Falmouth on 14 June. She sailed via Surinam and Guadeloupe. Captain Beer replaced Kirkness, being appointed on 28 June 1816.

Captain Thomas Beer sailed Queen Charlotte from Falmouth on 19 December 1816. She was at Madeira from 28–29 December. She arrived at Bahia on 26 January 1817 and left it on the 26th; she sailed from Rio on 23 February. She arrived back at Falmouth on 13 May.

Captain Beer sailed from Falmouth on 14 June. She was at Madeira on 3–4 July. She arrived at Rio on 18 August and left on 11 September. She was at Bahia on 28–30 September. She left Pernambuco on 9 October, and arrived at Falmouth on 14 November. This was her last voyage as a mail packet.

=== Whaler ===
Her owners, Bullock & Co., next sailed her on a whaling voyage after she undergone small repairs in 1818.

Year	Master	Owner	Trade	Source
1818	Kirkness; Morris	Bullock & Co.	Falmouth packet Plymouth–South Seas	LR
1820	Morris	Bullock & Co.	Plymouth–South Seas	LR

Captain Morris sailed for Peru on 18 August 1818. Prior to 11 April 1820 the Plymouth whaler Queen Charlotte reportedly put into Valparaiso unseaworthy and it was expected that she would be condemned. Queen Charlotte was last listed in LR in 1820.

However, she may have been sold locally and repaired. Between 1820 and 1821 there are a number of mentions in Lloyd's List of a Queen Charlotte, Mason, master, sailing along the Pacific coast of South America. (There are also no further mentions of a Queen Charlotte with Morris, master. (Mentions of a Queen Charlotte, Moss, master, are of a vessel launched on the Thames that traded with Brazil and Argentina, but that apparently never sailed into the Pacific.)

On 8 October 1820 Queen Charlotte sailed from Lima. Then on 12 May 1821 Queen Charlotte, Mason, master, arrived at Valparaiso from Cobega, Chile. On 16 September 1821 Qucen Charlotte [sic], Mason, master, sailed from Valparaiso for the Peruvian coast. The next mention is that she arrived at Valparaiso on 26 January 1822 from Guayaquil. On 24 September she arrived at Callao from Valparaiso.

Thereafter she disappears from Lloyd's List. She may well have been again sold locally, and renamed.
