= Anne Kura =

German politician (born 1984)

Member of the Landtag of Lower Saxony
- Incumbent
- Assumed office 8 November 2022

Personal details
- Born: 3 August 1984 (age 42)
- Party: Alliance 90/The Greens (since 2007)

Anne Kura (born 3 August 1984) is a German politician serving as a member of the Landtag of Lower Saxony since 2022. She has served as co-group leader of Alliance 90/The Greens since 2022.
