= Queen Charlotte (1807 packet) =

History

United Kingdom
- Name: Queen Charlotte
- Namesake: Charlotte of Mecklenburg-Strelitz
- Builder: Falmouth
- Launched: 1807
- Fate: Wrecked 16 January 1814

General characteristics
- Tons burthen: 180 (bm)
- Armament: 12 × 6-pounder guns

Queen Charlotte was a Falmouth packet boat, launched in 1807 at Falmouth. She was wrecked at Lisbon in 1814.

== Career ==
Queen Charlotte made only one voyage across the Atlantic. Queen Charlotte, Mudge, master, left Falmouth on 11 March 1808. She was at Halifax between 21 and 30 April. She was then at New York between 7 May and 10 June. On her return voyage she was at Halifax again between 16 and 23 June, and she arrived back at Falmouth on 13 July.

She apparently also made several transits to and from Cadiz, Gibraltar, and Lisbon.

A Queen Charlotte, packet (there were two at the time), sailed from Falmouth on 15 October, bound for New York. She lost her mast and was towed back into Falmouth on 27 October.

On 27 October 1811 Queen Charlotte, Quarme, master, sailed from Falmouth, bound for New York. She was at Halifax between 3 and 10 December. She was then at New York from 3 to 25 January 1813. She arrived back at Falmouth on 18 February.

On 7 December 1812 Queen Charlotte arrived at Passages with the loss of her head and much damage to her sails and rigging. There had been a gale on 3 and 4 December between England and Passages.

== Fate ==
On 16 January 1814 Queen Charlotte was at San Sebastián when a gale drove her on the rocks, wrecking her completely. Mr. Sebastian, the agent for packets at Passages, tried to organize a rescue, but Captain Mudge (her master and owner), and 16 of his crew died. Her mail and passengers were saved. Apparently, she had landed her mail and passengers before wrecking. Also 15 crew-members were saved; they were on shore too, having been given permission to go on shore the previous day. (Note: Mudge had been captain of an earlier Queen Charlotte which had been captured in 1805.)
