= Queen Charlotte (1815 ship) =

British merchant ship (1815–1822)

History

United Kingdom
- Name: Queen Charlotte
- Acquired: 1815
- Fate: Burnt 25 July 1822

General characteristics
- Tons burthen: 157, or 168 (bm)
- Armament: 2 × 4-pounder guns

Queen Charlotte first appeared in online British sources in 1815 and was probably the salvaged Queen Charlotte, which had been sunk in 1813. From 1819 she traded with Brazil and Argentina and was burnt at Buenos Aires on 25 July 1822.

== Origins ==
Queen Charlotte first appeared in the Register of Shipping (RS) in 1815 and in Lloyd's Register (LR) in 1816. However, they reported that she had been launched in 1790 or 1801. Her size, launch years, the timing of her appearance in the registers is consistent with her being the Queen Charlotte that sank after a collision in 1813. It would require original research perhaps to settle the matter.

== Career ==
Year	Master	Owner	Trade	Source & notes
1815	Nichols	Gardner	London–Madeira	RS
1816	J.Nichols	R.Gardner	Plymouth–Madeira	LR
1818	R.Taylor	Gardner	London–Rotterdam; London–CGH	LR
1819	R.Taylor	Gardner	London–CGH; London–Rio de Janeiro	LR; small repairs 1819
1820	R.Taylor; Moss	Gardner	London–Rio de Janeiro; London–Bahia	LR; small repairs 1819

== Fate ==
Queen Charlotte arrived at Buenos Aires from Montevideo on 27 April 1821. She arrived at Buenos Aires from Patagonia on 20 September 1821.

Queen Charlotte, Moss, master, was burnt at Buenos Aires on 25 July 1822.
