= Kura, Iran =

Kura or Kowra (Persian: كورا) in Iran may refer to:

- Kura, Bushehr
- Kura, Fars
