= HMS Boadicea (1797) =

Frigate of the Royal Navy

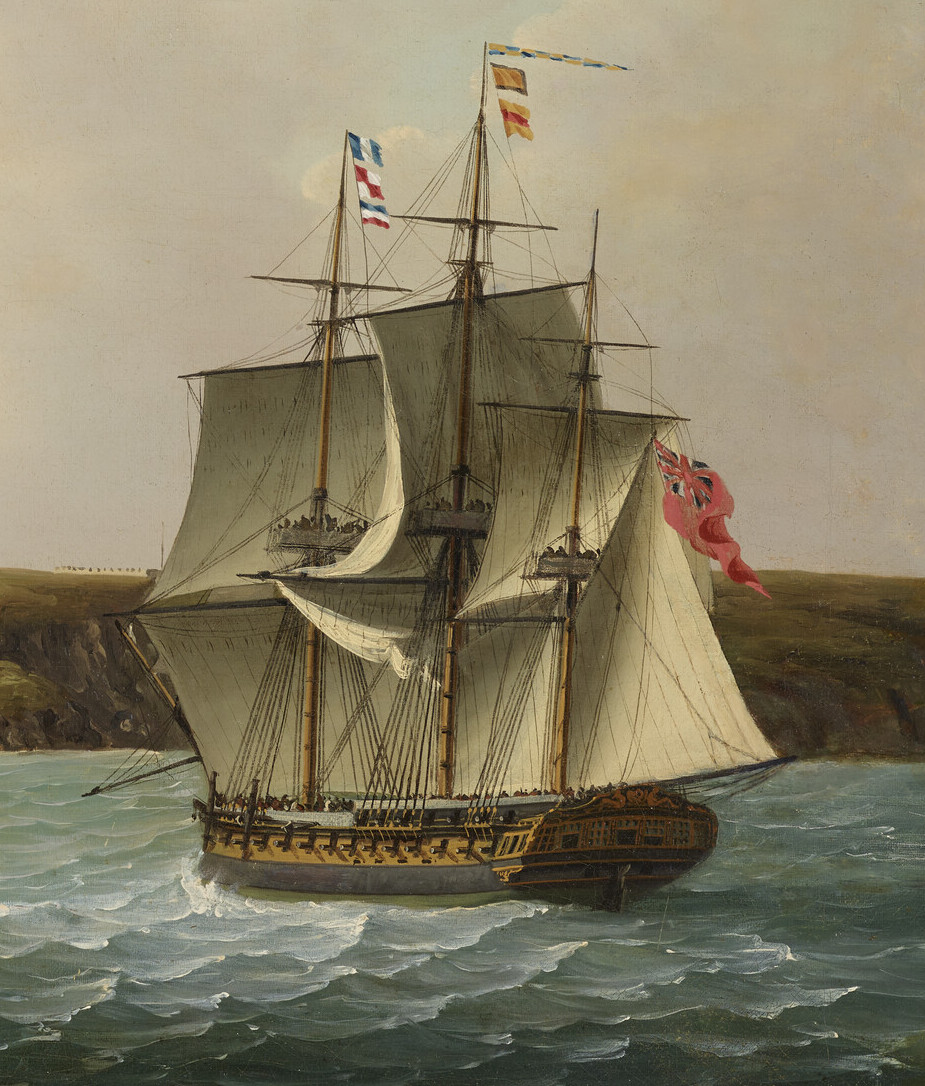
- 1801 painting of Boadicea near Brest in 1799

History

Great Britain
- Name: HMS Boadicea
- Namesake: Boudica
- Operator: Royal Navy
- Ordered: 30 April 1795
- Builder: Adams yard, Bucklers Hard
- Laid down: September 1795
- Launched: 12 April 1797
- Commissioned: 9 September 1797
- Honours and awards: Naval General Service Medal with clasp "Boadicea 18 Sept. 1810"
- Fate: Broken up 1858

General characteristics
- Tons burthen: 1052 5/94 (bm)
- Length: 148 ft 6 in (45.3 m) (overall); 123 ft 10 1/2 in (37.8 m) (keel)
- Beam: 39 ft 11 1/2 in (12.2 m)
- Depth of hold: 12 ft 8 in (3.9 m)
- Propulsion: Sail
- Complement: 284
- Armament: Upper deck: 28 × 18-pounder guns; QD: 8 × 9-pounder guns + 6 × 32-pounder carronades; FC: 2 × 9-pounder guns + 2 × 32-pounder carronades

HMS Boadicea was a 38-gun fifth-rate frigate of the Royal Navy. She served in the Channel and in the East Indies during which service she captured many prizes. She participated in one action for which the Admiralty awarded the Naval General Service Medal. She was broken up in 1858.

== Design ==
Boadicea was one of a batch of large frigates ordered in 1795, all of which were the largest of their type, and the majority of which were to the draught of captured French ships. She was built to the design of Imperieuse, a 40-gun ship completed in 1787 and captured in October 1793. Changes were made to the shape of the topsides, and the scantlings and fastenings were strengthened to reflect British practice. She retained her shallow French hull form, and as a result the holds and magazines were considered cramped.

== French Revolutionary Wars ==
Boadicea was commissioned under Captain Richard Keats for service in the Channel Fleet. Under Keats she served on this station for several years during which time she captured many prizes.

On 19 September 1797 Boadicea and Anson captured the French privateer brig Zephyr. She was out of Nantes, was armed with two brass 12-pounder guns and six 6-pounder guns, and had a crew of 70. She had not made any captures. The next day the two British vessels recaptured the ship Eliza, which was sailing under American colours. She had been sailing from London to the Cape of Good Hope with a cargo of merchandise when the French privateer Confiance had captured her. Then on the day after that, they recaptured the ship Jenny, of Greenock, which had been sailing from Liverpool to Virginia with a cargo of salt, earthenware and bale goods. The Jenny had fallen prey on 10 September, after a fight, to the privateer Hazard of Rochelle.

Then on 19 November 1797, Boadicea and Anson captured the privateer Railleur. She had a crew of 160 men and had been armed with 20 guns, but had thrown most of them overboard during the chase. She was one day out of Rochelle and had not taken any prizes. Nymph, Sylph and the hired armed cutter Dolly shared in the prize money. The same vessels shared in the recapture of several other vessels: Henniker, Active, Fanny, Mohawk, and Catherine. Around the 19th, Boadicea and Anson also recaptured a brig. Anson was running low on water and Keats sent her back into port.

Boadicea shared with Révolutionnaire, Pique, and the hired armed cutter Nimrod in the capture of Anna Christiana on 17 May 1798.

Around 18 June 1798 Boadicea captured the American ships Fanny and Lydia. On 9 December Boadicea captured Invincible Buonaparte, a French privateer of 20 guns (12 and 18-pounders) and 170 men. She was a new vessel, sixteen days out of Bordeaux and reportedly had not made any captures. However, a privateer by the same name had taken and burned the Friendship, Smith, master, which had been sailing from St Ube's to Falmouth. Boadicea sent Invincible Buonaparte, of "18 guns and 175 men" into Portsmouth. The Admiralty took Invincible Buonaparte into service as the 18-gun sloop Brazen. On the last day of the year, Boadicea recaptured the brig Adventure. The privateer Intrepid had captured Adventure, Warrington, master, as she was sailing from Tortola to London; Boadicea sent Adventure into Plymouth.

On 20 or 21 February 1799, Boadicea, Atalante, and Brilliant shared in the capture of the French privateer cutter Milan. She was armed with 14 guns and had a crew of 44 men. Keats ordered Atalante to take Milan into port, land the prisoners, and then rejoin Boadicea on station.

On 7 March Boadicea recaptured an American vessel sailing from Charlestown to Hamburg. The next day Boadicea interrupted the capture of a neutral vessel, which had been sailing from Charlestown to Embden, by a French privateer, which Boadicea captured. The privateer was the brig Requin, pierced for 18 guns but mounting 14. She had a crew of 70 men. On 9 March a gale caused Requin to overturn even though she had no sails set; the prize crew of ten men from Boadicea and a prisoner all drowned.

Still, on 1 April, Boadicea captured her third privateer of the cruise, the brig Utile. Utile was armed with sixteen 8-pounder guns, of which ten were brass. She had a crew of 120 men and was three weeks out of Bordeaux.

On 2 July Boadicea and some other frigates under Keats's overall command protected bomb vessels that bombarded some Spanish ships of the line anchored under the protection of batteries on the Île de Ré and a floating mortar battery moored near the Île d'Oléron. The British conducted their bombardment from too far away with the result that it was completely ineffective. They then broke off the attack and sailed away.

Around the turn of the year, Boadicea shared with a number of other vessels in her squadron in the capture of St. Francoise (25 December), St. Pierre de Carnac (12 January 1800), a brig of unknown name (17 January), and Anna Louisa (22 January). On 21 and 22 April 1800, Boadicea and Stag captured Zeegen and Hoop.

On 14 May Keats sent a boat with six men under the command of a midshipman on a reconnaissance mission into the outer roads of Brest. They encountered a French guard boat that they were able to repulse with the loss of one man. The midshipman later boarded a small sloop from whom he found out that the French fleet was in the inner road and that the Spanish vessels there were plagued by illness among the crew.

Then towards the middle of the year, on 24 June, Boadicea recaptured the sloop Gipsey, of Greenock, or Liverpool. Gipsey had been a prize to the French privateer Brave, of 36 guns, under the command of Captain Le Bee, and had been sailing from the West Indies when originally captured.

On 4 July Boadicea was in sight when Sirius and Indefatigable captured the French vessel Favori. Four days later, Boadicea was in company with the same two warships when they recaptured Cultivator. Cultivator (or Cultivateur), was a West Indiaman sailing from Demerara and Essequibo, with a cargo valued at £20,000.

A week later, Bordelais captured Phoenix. Boadicea was one of the vessels that would later share in the prize money by agreement. One month later, on 14 August, Boadicea captured the Spanish vessel Union. She was a large vessel of 650 tons, armed with 22 guns, and carrying a crew of 130 men. She had sailed from Corunna the day before, heading towards Buenos Aires with a cargo of merchandise. Fisgard, Uranie, Unicorn and the hired armed cutter Earl St Vincent shared in the prize.

Boadicea also shared in several other prizes that other frigates under Keats' command captured between 4 July and 23 October. In addition to Phoenix, these included Gironde, Alerte, Joseph, Magicienne, Dicke, Rancune, Vivo, Favorite, and Venus. Several of these were privateers.

In 1801 Captain Charles Rowley took command of Boadicea. With her he commanded a light squadron in Quiberon Bay where she "greatly molested the enemy". On 10 January Boadicea captured the French gun vessel Bombarde, which had been sailing from Havre to Brest. Bombarde arrived in Plymouth six days later.

On 20 August, the boats of Fisgard, Diamond, and Boadicea carried out a cutting-out expedition at A Coruña. The boats went in at night and brought out Neptune, a new ship belonging to the Spanish Navy and pierced for 20 guns, a gunboat armed with a long 32-pounder gun, and a merchant vessel. The Spanish vessels were anchored close to the batteries that protected the fort and sentinels challenged the British. The Spaniards commenced fire, but the cutting-out party was able to bring the vessels out without having suffered any casualties. One of the vessels was the packet ship Reyno Duno. She came into Plymouth on September and the Naval Chronicle described her as "Beautiful,... of four suits of sails and other naval stores". She had apparently been on her way to Havana.

Between April 1802 and March 1803 Boadicea was fitted at Plymouth. She was recommissioned in December 1802 under Captain John Maitland. He went on to command Boadicea in the Channel.

On 20 May 1803, Boadicea and Kite, captured the Dutch ship Minerva. On 30 May Boadicea detained the Dutch ship Vrow Elizabeth. The London Gazette mentions that this was "previous to the Declaration of Hostilities". (Britain and France renewed hostilities on 18 May 1803, but the issue may have been hostilities with the Dutch.) Still, prize money was awarded. Furthermore, on 31 May Boadicea captured Joanna Catharina.

== Napoleonic Wars ==
While Maitland and Boadicea were serving with the inshore squadron at Brest, Boadicea hit the Bas de Lis. This caused a large hole in her hull with the result that she started taking on water. Even the contribution of 100 seamen from other vessels, together with additional pumps, barely kept her afloat. A frigate escorted her to Portsmouth. Boadicea returned to her station within eight days, having spent only three days in dock undergoing repairs.

On 9 June 1803 Boadicea sent into Plymouth the small French privateer Eleonore, which had a crew of 27 men. The privateer was 11 days out of St. Maloes but had not made any captures. (Note: Eleonore, of about 25 tons burthen, was offered at auction at Plymouth on 17 January 1804.) On the same day Boadicea recaptured London Packet. London Packet, Brown, master, had been sailing from Virginia to Guernsey when she was captured earlier that day. Boadicea sent her into Plymouth.

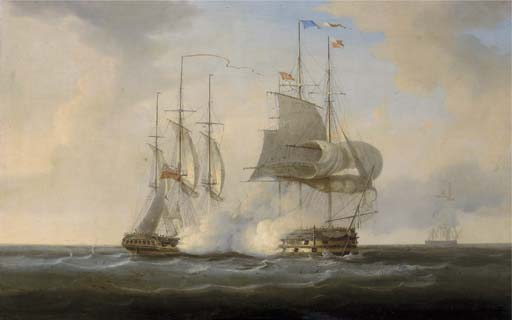
The gallant encounter between Boadicea and two French warships Le Duquay-Trouin and Guerriére on 31 August 1803

Then on 25 November, Maitland and Boadicea were eight leagues off Cape Finisterre when they captured the French navy lugger Vautour, commanded by Monsieur Bigot, lieutenant de vaisseau. She was 43 days from St. Domingo and had on board a Commissarie de Marine with dispatches from General Rochambeau at Cape François. Vautour was pierced for 16 guns but mounted twelve 6-pounder guns, 10 of which she threw overboard during the chase. She had a crew of 92 men. (Note: Michel Colin-Olivier had built Vautour at Dieppe in 1795. Vautour, of about 130 tons burthen was offered at auction at Plymouth on 17 January 1804. Vautour was a sister ship to the French navy lugger Affronteur, which HMS Doris had captured, on 18 May 1803, the first day of the war.)

On 24 and 25 September Boadicea was in sight when Pickle captured two French chasse-marees loaded with supplies for the French fleet at Brest, and brought them into Plymouth. Lapenotiere had driven them into the Bay there and then sent his boats to bring them out. The two French vessels may have been Marie Française from Bordeaux and Desirée from Quimper.

On 28 March 1805, Boadicea arrived at Yarmouth with 250 men that she had brought from the Texel. They were part of the crew of Romney, which had wrecked there in late 1804.

On 19 April 1805 Boadicea captured Zeldenrust. Boadicea shared with Penelope and Moselle in the proceeds of Jonge Obyna, Smidt, master, on 13 June. (Note: A seaman's share of a £1700 advance on the prize money was 16s 2 1/2d.) That same day they also captured Sophia. The final payment for Jonge Obyna and Sophia did not get paid out until June 1817. (Note: A first-class share, such as a captain would receive, was worth £104 3s 4d; a fifth-class share, that of a seaman, was worth 11s 10 1/4d.)

Next, in company with Dryad, Boadicea fell in with four French line-of-battle ships under Rear-Admiral Pierre Dumanoir le Pelley, off Ferrol. The four French vessels had escaped from the Battle of Trafalgar. Boadicea and Dryad tried to lead the enemy into the path of a Royal Navy squadron by firing rockets but lost them a short time after Sir Richard Strachan saw their signals. Neither Boadicea nor Dryad therefore shared in the Battle of Cape Ortegal, in which the British captured all four French ships.

On 12 December, Boadicea, Arethusa, and Wasp left Cork, escorting a convoy of 23 merchant vessels. Four days later the convoy encountered a French squadron consisting of five ships of the line and four sailing frigates, as well as nine other vessels that were too far away for assessment. The letter writer to the Naval Chronicle surmised that the distant vessels were the Africa squadron that had been escorted by Lark and that they had captured. On this occasion, The British warships and six merchant vessels went one way and the rest went another way. The French chased the warships and the six for a day, ignored the 17, and eventually gave up their pursuit. Boadicea then shadowed the French while Wasp went back to French and Spanish coasts to alert the British warships there. Arethusa and her six charges encountered the French squadron again the next day, but after a desultory pursuit the French sailed off.

In the autumn of 1806 or early 1807 Boadicea was employed protecting the whale fishery in the Davis Strait, in company with Topaze. Maitland then sailed to Newfoundland, from where he brought back a convoy for Oporto. On the way he found out that the French had entered Portugal so he diverted to London. On 4 September 1807, Loire, with Boadicea, Defender, and Strenuous in company, captured the American ship Exchange, Peter Ledet, Master.

On 26 October 1807, Tsar Alexander I of Russia declared war on Great Britain. The official news did not arrive there until 2 December, at which time the British declared an embargo on all Russian vessels in British ports. Boadicea was one of some 70 vessels that shared in the proceeds of the seizure of the 44-gun Russian frigate Speshnoy (Speshnyy), and the Russian storeship Wilhelmina (or Vilghemina) then in Portsmouth harbour. The Russian vessels were carrying the payroll for Vice-Admiral Dmitry Senyavin's squadron in the Mediterranean. (Note: Consequently, a seaman on any one of the 70 British vessels received 14s 7 1/2d in prize money.)

On 26 January 1808 Boadicea was in company with Resistance when they captured the French privateer General Conclaux. Resistance also captured another French privateer. Their captors sent both privateers into Portsmouth.

Then on 27 March, Boadicea, Medusa, the cutter Alphea, and schooner Ant captured 25 French fishing vessels. (Note: A seaman's share of the prize money was 14s 2 3/4d, or about two weeks' wages.) On 8 August Boadicea was in company with Solebay and the gun-brig Linnet when they captured the Pappenbourg galiot Yonge Harriot or Young Harriot.

In June 1808 Captain John Hatley took command of Boadicea. She sailed from Portsmouth to the Cape of Good Hope on 9 February 1809.

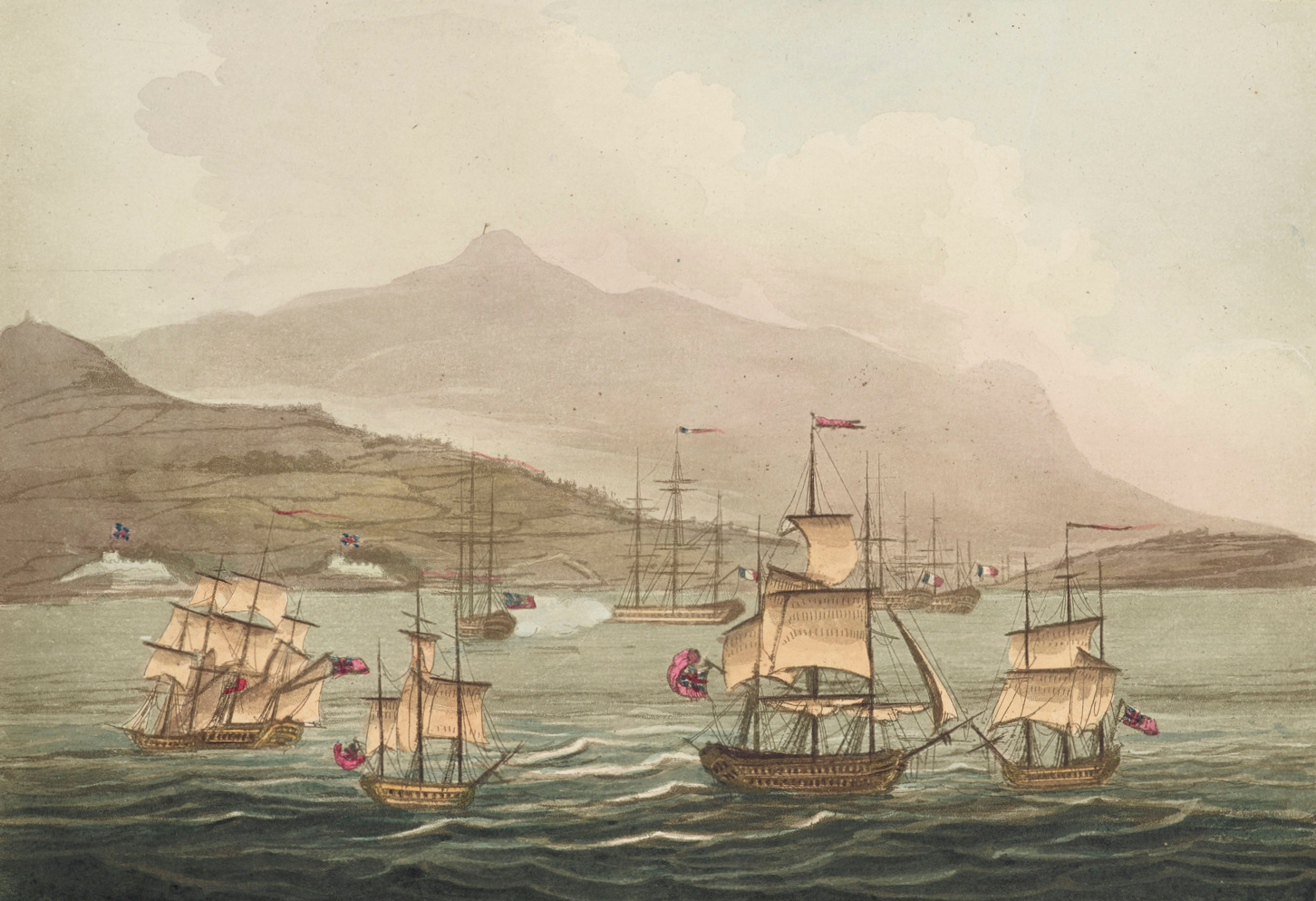
A view showing Boadicea attacking Saint Paul's Island 21 September 1809. The advanced British Frigate, is the Sirius, Capt. Pym, raking the French frigate La Caroline.

In September 1809 she served in a squadron of frigates and sloops in the expedition against Saint-Paul, on Bonaparte Island (also known as Île de Bourbon and today as Réunion). The naval commander was Captain Josias Rowley, aboard the Third Rate Raisonnable. Rowley assigned Boadicea to blockade the port.

The British troops and Royal Marines landed without alarming the batteries, which they stormed and carried. The rest of the squadron then stood into the bay and exchanged fire with the French frigate Caroline. Soon the batteries, town and shipping were all in British hands for the total loss of 22 killed, 76 wounded, and four missing. Boadicea, which had not been able to maintain the blockade, contributed Royal Marines to the attack, one of whom was killed and five of whom were wounded. The British had achieved their objectives, the capture of French shipping and the destruction of the defenses of the only safe anchorage on the island. They then withdrew.

Captain Rowley moved to Boadicea and on 7 July 1810, and with three other frigates, he escorted a force of 1,650 European soldiers and 1,600 sepoys from Madras, together with 1,000 from Rodriguez, against Réunion again, but this time with the aim of taking the island. Boadicea herself transported troops and her boats were active in landing troops. The island surrendered on 9 July. Rowley appointed Lieutenant Robb, Boadicea's First Lieutenant, to carry the dispatches to Cape Town in the brig Anna.

On 28 August Boadicea, Staunch, and Otter shared in the capture of Garronne. On 4 September the same three vessels shared in the capture of Ranger. (Note: The prize money for a first-class share was worth £55 14s 11d; an ordinary seaman received 10s 7 1/2d.)

After the Battle of Grand Port, which was a disaster for the British, Commodore Josias Rowley sent urgent messages to Madras and Cape Town requesting reinforcements. The first to arrive were Africaine and Ceylon, both of which were sailing alone. In the action of 13 September 1810, Iphigénie and Astrée captured Africaine. She had been sailing with Boadicea, Otter, and Staunch trailing some distance behind. When she chased the French frigates and the brig Entreprenant early on the morning of 13 September, she outdistanced her companions, with unfortunate results. Africaine had 49 men killed and 114 wounded. The French took about 90 survivors prisoner and conveyed them to Mauritius where they remained until the British took the island in December. The French lost nine killed and 33 wounded in Iphigénie and one killed and two wounded in Astrée.

The next day Boadicea and her two companions recaptured Africaine. Because she was dismasted and damaged the French had not tried to tow her. When Boadicea recaptured her, Africaine still had 70 of her wounded and some 83 uninjured of her crew aboard, as well as a ten-man French prize crew.

The French had also captured Ceylon, but Boadicea quickly retook her too. Then Rowley was able to seize Jacques Hamelin and his flagship Vénus at the action of 18 September 1810. Nearly four decades later the Admiralty recognized Boadicea by authorizing the clasp "Boadicea 18 Sept. 1810" to the Naval General Service Medal, awarded upon application to all British participants still living in 1847.

On 21 November 1810 Vice Admiral Bertie led a large fleet of warships and transports to attack Isle de France (now Mauritius), the French surrendering on 7 December 1810. (Note: The admiral's share of the prize money was £2650 5s 2d. A first-class share was worth £278 19s 5 3/4d; a sixth-class share, that of an ordinary seaman, was worth £3 7s 6 1/4d. A fourth and final payment was made in July 1828. A first-class share was worth £29 19s 5 1/4d; a sixth-class share was worth 8s 2 1/2d. This time, Bertie received £314 14s 3 1/2d.) Captain Rowley and Boadicea returned to England with Vice Admiral Bertie's dispatches.

Captain Viscount Ralph Neville took command of Boadicea in February 1811. She was then laid up in ordinary in May 1811.

== Post war ==
Boadicea underwent extensive repairs, costing some £35,433, in Plymouth between February 1815 and August 1816. She was then laid up.

In October 1824 Captain Sir James Brisbane recommissioned Boadicea, which underwent fitting for sea, at a cost of £9,387, between October and January 1825.

Brisbane then sailed her to the East Indies, where she participated in the First Anglo-Burmese War. Brisbane retired to Pulo Penang early in 1826 due to ill-health. He died on 19 December 1826. Commander John Wilson then sailed Boadicea back to Britain.

== Fate ==
Boadicea underwent a repair at Chatham between December 1829 and 1830 that cost £10,027. She was then laid up. She was on harbour service in 1854. Her break up was completed at Chatham on 22 May 1858.

== Sailing Qualities ==
"Average under sail, not recording more than 9kts close hauled and 11.5kts off the wind, good sea boat ... tolerably handy in staying and wearing." She received extensions to her gripe and another 4 inches onto her false keel, suggesting a lack of weatherliness as built.

== Fiction ==
Boadicea is Jack Aubrey's command in the book The Mauritius Command, which follows the events of the historical Mauritius campaign, with Aubrey replacing the historical commander of Boadicea, Josias Rowley.

== See also ==
- List of frigate classes of the Royal Navy
