= Queen Charlotte (1786 ship) =

History

Great Britain
- Name: Queen Charlotte
- Acquired: 1785
- Fate: Last listed in 1796

General characteristics
- Tons burthen: 440, or 450 (bm)
- Complement: 54
- Armament: 10 × 6-pounder guns

Queen Charlotte was built in France and first appeared in Lloyd's Register (LR) in 1786, the 1785 issue, if any, not being available on line. She was employed as whaler, in the British northern whale fishery, sailing to Greenland and Davis Strait. From late 1793 she made at least one voyage as a West Indiaman. Although she was last listed in 1796, there is no evidence that she sailed again after late 1794.

== Career ==
Queen Charlotte first appeared in online records in 1786 as a northern fisheries whaler. On 24 July 1786 a newspaper reported that Queen Charlotte, Wheatley, master, had arrived in the Thames from Greenland with four "fish" (whales).

Year	Master	Owner	Trade	Source
1786	J.Wheatly	Thompson	London–Greenland	LR
1790	J.Wheatly	Thompson	London–Davis Strait	LR; repairs 1787
1793	J.Wheatly	Thompson	London–Davis Strait	LR; damages repaired 1791

On 9 March 1793, immediately after the outbreak of war with France Captain John Wheatley acquired a letter of marque. However, Queen Charlotte continued to operate as a whaler. On 4 September 1793, Queen Charlotte arrived at Gravesend from Davis Strait.

Queen Charlotte became a West Indiaman, returning to Gravesend on 2 October 1794 from Martinique.

Year	Master	Owner	Trade	Source
1795	J.Wheatly	Thompson	London–Davis Strait	LR; repairs 1787 & damages repaired 1791
1796	J.Wheatley	Thompson; J.Smith	London–Davis Strait	LR; repairs 1787 & damages repaired 1791

== Fate ==
Queen Charlotte was last listed in LR in 1796. However, she does not appear in Lloyd's List or the press after 1794.
