= Novopavlovsk =

Novopavlovsk Новопавловск
- Town
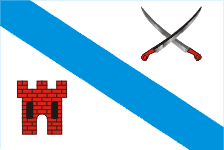
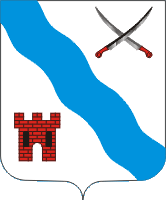
- Flag Coat of arms
- Interactive map of Novopavlovsk
- Location of Novopavlovsk Novopavlovsk (Stavropol Krai)
- Coordinates: 43°57′N 43°38′E
- Country: Russia
- Federal subject: Stavropol Krai
- Administrative district: Kirovsky District
- TownSelsoviet: Novopavlovsk
- Founded: 1777
- Elevation: 330 m (1,080 ft)

Population (2010 Census)
  - Total: 26,562
  - Estimate (2025): 20,490 (−22.9%)

Administrative status
  - Capital of: Kirovsky District, Town of Novopavlovsk

Municipal status
  - Municipal district: Kirovsky Municipal District
  - Urban settlement: Novopavlovsk Urban Settlement
  - Capital of: Kirovsky Municipal District, Novopavlovsk Urban Settlement
- Time zone: UTC+3 (MSK)
- Postal code: 357300–357303
- OKTMO ID: 07716000001
- Website: www.admnp.ru

Novopavlovsk (Russian: Новопа́вловск) is a town and the administrative center of Kirovsky District in Stavropol Krai, Russia, located on the left bank of the Kura River. Population: 26,562 (2010 census); 23,235 (2002 census); 18,589 (1989 Soviet census).

== History ==
It was founded in 1777.

== Administrative and municipal status ==
Within the framework of administrative divisions, Novopavlovsk serves as the administrative center of Kirovsky District. As an administrative division, it is incorporated within Kirovsky District as the Town of Novopavlovsk. As a municipal division, the Town of Novopavlovsk is incorporated within Kirovsky Municipal District as Novopavlovsk Urban Settlement.
