= Kura (Russia) =

Coordinates: 44.0350°N 44.8331°E

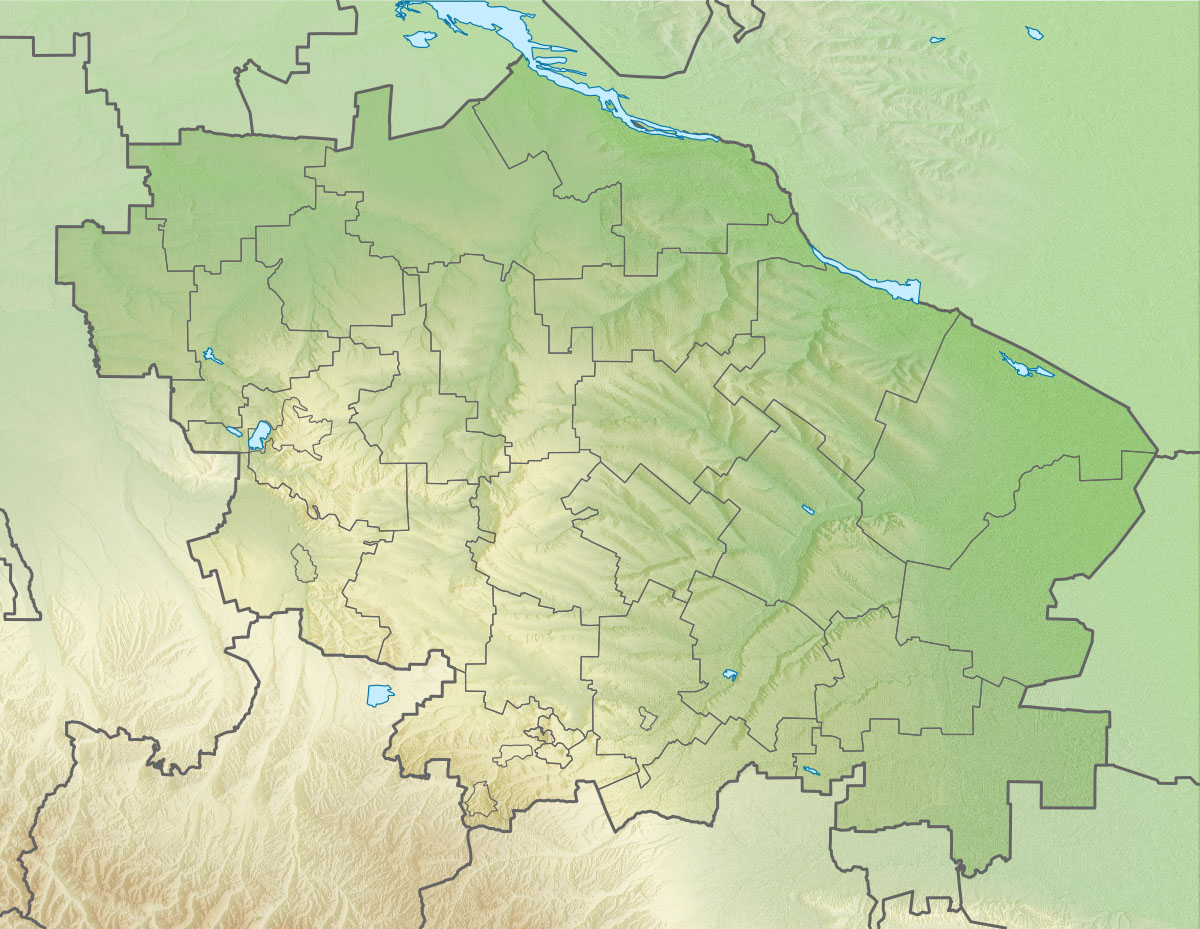
- Location within Stavropol Krai Location within European Russia
- Native name: Кура (Russian)

Location
- Country: Russia

Physical characteristics
- Source
  - location: North Caucasus
- Mouth
  - location: Nogai Steppe
- Length: 150 km (93 mi)

The Kura (Russian: Кура) is a river in Stavropol Krai, Russia. The river is approximately 150 km long. It flows from North Caucasus and ends in the Nogai Steppe where it drains into the ground. Novopavlovsk, a town of 23,235 founded in 1777, is located on the left bank of the river.
