= Queen Charlotte (1802 ship) =

Smack for the Old Ship Company of Berwick

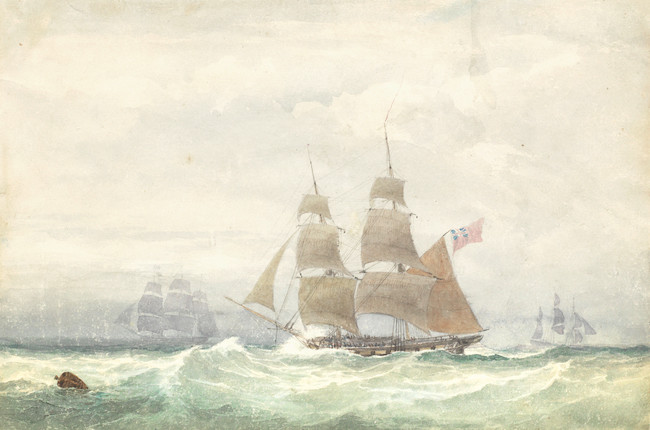
- A vessel believed to be the Leith smack Queen Charlotte; John Christian Schetky (British, 1778–1874) (Note: Schetky and Captain William Nisbet of Queen Charlotte were friends. Schetky made frequent summer voyages from London to Edinburgh aboard Queen Charlotte. In 1837, Schetky also made a water colour of the action when she repelled an attack by a French privateer.)

History

United Kingdom
- Name: Queen Charlotte
- Operator: Old Ship Company (Note: The London and Leith Old Ship Company had been founded in Berwick but transferred to Leith early in the 19th century.)
- Builder: Gowan, Berwick
- Launched: 1802
- Fate: Sunk 26 October 1827

General characteristics
- Tons burthen: 136 (bm)
- Sail plan: Smack
- Armament: 6 × 18-pounder carronades + 2 (or 4) × 4-pounder guns

Queen Charlotte was a smack launched in 1802 in Berwick for the Old Ship Company of Berwick. She repelled in 1804 the attack of a French privateer in a single-ship action. A collier ran Queen Charlotte down and sank her on 26 October 1826.

== Career ==
The Old Shipping Company of Leith painted a white strip on the hulls of its vessels. This resulted in their vessels being known as "White siders". Vessels belonging to other companies followed different colour schemes.

Queen Charlotte first appeared in Lloyd's Register (LR) in 1802. The Old Ship Company advertised that she had been armed by the government. The government had a program of arming merchantmen to enable them to protect themselves from French privateers.

Year	Master	Owner	Trade	Source
1802	Wm. Nesbitt	Old Ship Company	Leith–London	LR

On 24 January 1804, the packet Queen Charlotte, under the command of William Nisbett and belonging to the Old Shipping Company, of Berwick, encountered a French privateer cutter of 14 guns. The privateer fired a shot and called on Nisbet to surrender. Nisbett fired back and an engagement of more than an hour and a half ensued before the privateer sailed away empty-handed. In the fight, Nisbett and another seaman were wounded.

The carronades were mounted on the non-recoil principal. Nisbett reported that he would have liked more guns, but that Queen Charlotte's armament was sufficient to have protected other trading vessels. The owners of the company gave Captain Nesbit a reward of £105.

Year	Master	Owner	Trade	Source & notes
1805	Wm. Nesbitt	Old Ship Company	Leith–London	LR
1820	Wm. Nesbitt	Old Ship Company	Leith–London	LR; good repair 1813
1827	G.Crabb	Old Ship Company	London coaster	LR; good repair 1813 & 1821

== Fate ==
Queen Charlotte, James Nicholson, master, left Leith on 16 October 1827 with 11 passengers and 76 puncheons of "superior whisky" destined for a "gude Scott" of London. On 27 October the collier Silvia (or Sylvan), of Shields ran into her off Lowestoffe and cut her in half. Nicholson barely had time to get his crew and passengers aboard Silvia before Queen Charlotte sank without a trace.
