= Sylvan (1800 ship) =

History

Great Britain
- Name: Sylvan
- Builder: South Shore, Gateshead
- Launched: 1800
- Fate: Wrecked 29 March 1834

General characteristics
- Tons burthen: 184, or 187, or 200 (bm)
- Length: 82.8 ft 8 in (25.4 m)
- Beam: 23 ft 5 in (7.1 m)
- Sail plan: Snow; later brig
- Armament: 2 × 4-pounder guns (1815)

Sylvan (or Silvian, or Silvan), was launched on the River Tyne in 1800. She traded with the Baltic and North America. In 1827 she ran down and sank a coaster. In the 1830s she carried immigrants to Canada. She herself was wrecked on 29 March 1834.

== Career ==
Sylvan first appeared in Lloyd's Register in 1800.

| Year | Master | Owner | Trade | Source & notes |
|---|---|---|---|---|
| 1800 | W.Ostell | A.Hood | London–Antigua | Lloyd's Register |
| 1805 | W.Ostell | A.Hood | London–Antigua | Lloyd's Register |
| 1810 | W.Ostell | A.Hood | London–Bermuda | Lloyd's Register |
| 1815 | Wright | Smith | London coaster | Register of Shipping |
| 1825 | J.Noble | Snowdon | Plymouth–Quebec | Lloyd's Register; large repair 1823 |

On 22 December 1824 a gale drove Sylvan ashore between Hartlepool and Sunderland.

Sinking of Queen Charlotte: On 27 October 1827 the smack Queen Charlotte, Nicholson, master, was sailing from Leith to London with passengers and cargo when Silvia/Sylvan, of Shields, ran into her off Lowestoffe and cut her in half. Nicholson barely had time to get his crew and passengers aboard Silvia before Queen Charlotte sank without a trace.

| Year | Master | Owner | Trade | Source & notes |
|---|---|---|---|---|
| 1827 | Bell | Snowdon | Hull–Shields | Lloyd's Register |
| 1830 | W.Gilham | J.H.Palmer | Yarmouth–Dantzig | Lloyd's Register; repairs 1823 & damages repaired 1829 |

On 23 July 1831 Silvan, Gilham, master, delivered 62 settlers from Yarmouth to Quebec.

On 4 June 1832 Sylvan, Gilham, master, arrived at Quebec with 16 immigrants that she had brought from Yarmouth. She had sailed on 12 April.

== Fate ==
Sylvan, Stephenson, master, of North Shields, was wrecked on 29 March 1834 in the Kattegat. She was carrying coals, grindstones, coal tar, etc. from Newcastle upon Tyne to Wismar. A heavy gale had driven her ashore on an island. At daylight some fishermen discovered her and succeeded in getting a rope from her mast to the shore. Shortly after her crew were hauled ashore she went to pieces.
