= Queen Charlotte (1770 ship) =

History

Great Britain
- Builder: Ireland
- Launched: 1770
- Fate: Sold 1793

General characteristics
- Tons burthen: 44, or 46, or 70 (bm)
- Complement: 16 (1792)
- Armament: 1789: 4 guns; 1792: No guns

Queen Charlotte was built in Ireland in 1770, but did not appear in British online records until 1786. She made two voyages as a slave ship in the triangular trade in enslaved people. She was sold in Barbados in 1793 after delivering the captives from her second voyage.

== Career ==
Queen Charlotte first appeared in Lloyd's Register (LR) in 1786, having been almost rebuilt in 1785.

Year	Master	Owner	Trade	Source & notes
1786	J.Thomas; J.Black	Williams & Co.	Bristol–Cork	LR
1789	Fitzgerald; W.Newton	J.John & Co.	Bristol–Cork; Bristol–Africa	LR

1st voyage transporting enslaved people (1789–1791): Captain William Newton sailed from Bristol on 21 November 1789. She gathered her captives at Anomabu and arrived with 74 captives at Jamaica. She sailed from Jamaica on 26 January 1791 and arrived back at Bristol on 28 April.

2nd voyage transporting enslaved people (1792–1793): Captain John George sailed from Bristol 23 June 1792. She acquired captives at Anomabu and sailed from Cape Coast Castle on 28 August 1793. She had taken on 70 captives: 44 grown males, 25 grown females, and one male under 4 ft 4 in (1.3 m). One woman died on the voyage. Queen Charlotte arrived at Barbados with 69 captives. At some point J.Roach became master of Queen Charlotte.

One of the provisions of the Slave Trade Act 1788 (Dolben's Act), was bonuses for the master (£100) and surgeon (£50) if the mortality among the captives was under 2%; a mortality rate of under 3% resulted in a bonus of half that. Dolben's Act was the first British legislation passed to regulate slave shipping. Dolben's Act apparently resulted in some reduction in the numbers of captives carried per vessel, and possibly in mortality, though the evidence is ambiguous. (Note: At the time the monthly wage for a captain of an enslaving ship out of Bristol was £5 per month. That said, masters and surgeons received most of their income in the form of "coast commissions", based on the total number of captives they delivered, plus the income of the sale of two (or more) privilege captives.)

Fate: The vessel was reported sold at Barbados.
