= Royal Bounty (1785 ship) =

British whaler 1785–1819

History

Great Britain
- Name: George and Sarah
- Builder: South Carolina
- Launched: 1770
- Renamed: Royal Bounty
- Fate: Wrecked 16 July 1819

General characteristics
- Tons burthen: 282 (bm)
- Armament: 6 × 6-pounder guns, or 6 × 6-pounder guns + 2 × 12-pounder carronades

Royal Bounty was launched in South Carolina in 1770, probably as George and Sarah. Her owners changed her name to Royal Bounty circa 1786. As Royal Bounty she sailed out of Leith, going on annual whale hunting voyages to the northern whale fishery (Greenland and Davis Strait). She was wrecked in 1819 on her 35th such voyage.

== Career ==
=== George and Sarah ===
George and Sarah first appeared in Lloyd's Register (LR) in 1779.

Year	Master	Owner	Trade	Source & notes
1779	G.Watson	G.Selby	Cork transport	LR; lengthened 1774
1784	G.Watson; G.Selby	G.Selby	London; London–Memel	LR; lengthened 1774, and good repair 1784

=== Royal Bounty ===
Circa 1785 new owners renamed George and Sarah to Royal Bounty; she also underwent a thorough repair. From then on until her loss she was a whaler. Although there is no online copy of LR for 1785, there is a press report that she had returned to Leith from Greenland in August 1785 "clean", i.e., without having caught anything.

Year	Master	Owner	Trade	Source & notes
1786	R.Liddell	J.Scougal	Greenland–Leith	LR; lengthened and rebuilt 1778, thorough repair 1785; former George and Sarah
1787	R.Liddell; W.Paton	J.Scougal	Greenland–Leith	LR; lengthened and rebuilt 1778, thorough repair 1785; former George and Sarah
1789	W.Paton; J.Wilson	J.Scougal	Leith–Greenland	LR; lengthened and rebuilt 1778, thorough repair 1785, repairs 1786
1790	C.Reid; J. Boyd	J.Scougal	Leith–Greenland	LR; lengthened and rebuilt 1778, thorough repair 1785, repairs 1786
1792	J.Boyd; J.Newton	J.Scougal	Leith–Davis Strait	LR; lengthened and rebuilt 1778, thorough repair 1785
1805	J.Newton; J. Wright	Douglas	Leith–Davis Strait	LR; lengthened and rebuilt 1778, thorough repair 1785, repairs 1786, 1796, and 1800
1810	J.Wright; R.Kelly	Douglas	Leith–Davis Strait	LR; repairs 1800
1810	J.Wright; Kellie	Wood & Co.	Leith–Davis Strait	RS; small repairs 1806 & 1807
1814	R.Kellis; Drysdale	Douglas	Leith–Greenland	LR; repairs 1811
1818	J.Drysdal; J.Rich	Woods & Co.	Leith–Greenland	LR; repairs 1811
1819	J.Rich	Wood & Co.	Leith–Greenland	LR; repairs 1811

=== Whaling voyages ===
The data below for the period 1785 to 1814 comes from press mentions. The data from 1814 on comes primarily from Coltish, augmented by press reports.

Year	Master	Where	Whales	Tuns whale oil	Butts blubber	Notes
1785	Liddell	Greenland				Clean late in the season
1786			4			
1787	Paton	Greenland	12			
1788	Paton	Greenland	1	20		Seven seals, & 1 cwt of whalebone
1789	Reid	Greenland	Clean			
1790	Boyd	Davis Strait				
1791	Boyd	Greenland	Clean			
1792						No press report
1793		Davis strait	1			
1794		Davis Strait	2			
1795		Davis Strait	7			
1796		Davis Strait	5			
1797	Newton	Davis Strait	8			Full ship
1798		Davis Strait	Clean			
1799	Newton	Davis Strait	8			Full ship
1800	Newton	Davis Strait	7			
1801	Newton	West coast of Greenland				Full ship; Royal Bounty grossed £5463 for the voyage
1802	Newton	Davis Strait	10			
1803	Newton	Davis Strait				
1804	Newton	Davis Strait	9		400	
1805	Wright	Davis Strait	6			

On 13 April 1806 Royal Bounty lost her mizzen mast and several men but was able to get a new mast and proceed to the fishery.

Year	Master	Where	Whales	Tuns whale oil	Butts blubber	Notes
1806	Wright	Davis Strait	3			
1807						No press report
1808	Wright	Davis Strait	8			
1809	Wright	Davis Strait	9			
1810	Kelley	Davis Strait	Well fished			
1811		Davis Strait	8			
1812	Kellie	Greenland	19		300	
1813	Kelly	Greenland	2		70 butts	
1814	Drysdale	Greenland	6	47.5	260 butts or 291 casks	3.5 tons whale fins
1815	Drysdale	Davis Strait	3, 7, or 8	36.5		
1816	Drysdale	6, or 15	50			
1817	Drysdale	Greenland	4	26.5		
1818	Ritch	Greenland	3	15		
1819	Ritch	Greenland	3			Lost with her cargo

== Fate ==
Royal Bounty, Ritch, master, was wrecked on 16 July 1819. She was one of 10 whalers lost within a few days of each other in the Davis Strait due to gales in the ice fields. Her crew was saved. She had taken three whales before she was lost.
