= Antelope (disambiguation) =

Antelope are herbivorous mammals.

Antelope(s) may also refer to:

== Animals ==
- Pronghorn, often referred to as the pronghorn antelope, and the only surviving member of the family Antilocapridae

== Places ==
=== United States ===
- Antelope, California, a census-designated place in Sacramento County
- Dunnigan, California, a census-designated place in Yolo County formerly named Antelope
- Antelope, Kansas
- Antelope, Montana
- Antelope, Oregon
- Antelope, South Dakota
- Antelope, Texas
- Antelope Canyon, Arizona

=== Elsewhere ===
- Antelope, Newfoundland and Labrador, Canada
- Antelope Mine, Zimbabwe

== Transportation ==
=== Aircraft ===
- Avro Antelope, British light bomber of the 1920s
- Sopwith Antelope, small post-World War I British transport airplane

=== Rail transportation ===
- Antelope (passenger train), a regular revenue train of the Atchison, Topeka and Santa Fe Railway
- Antelope (Eagle class), a 4-4-0 saddle tank broad gauge locomotive
- LNER Thompson Class B1 locomotives, known as 'Bongos' or 'Antelopes'

=== Ships ===
- HMS Antelope, twelve ships of the Royal Navy
- USS Antelope, three ships of the US Navy
- Antelope (ship), one of numerous non-military vessels named Antelope

== Other uses ==
- Grand Canyon Antelopes, athletic teams of Grand Canyon University
- The Antelope, a case before the United States Supreme Court, arising from the capture of the slave ship Antelope
- Antelope Ground, a former cricket and football stadium in Southampton, England
- antelope.tigris.org, a graphical user interface for running Apache Ant
- "Antelopes", a Series A episode of the television series QI
- Antelope air defence system, a Taiwanese anti-aircraft defense system

== See also ==
- Antelope Valley (disambiguation), multiple valleys with the same name
  - Antelope Valley, a valley in the U.S. state of California
- Antilope, a taxonomic genus containing the blackbuck
- List of mountain ranges named Antelope
