= List of shipwrecks in 1784 =

The List of shipwrecks in 1784 includes ships sunk, foundered, wrecked, grounded, or otherwise lost during 1784.

table of contents
1784
Jan	Feb	Mar	Apr
May	Jun	Jul	Aug
Sep	Oct	Nov	Dec
Unknown date

== January ==
=== 2 January ===
List of shipwrecks: 2 January 1784
Ship	State	Description
Liverpool	Great Britain	The ship was driven ashore and wrecked on the coast of Ireland. She was on a voyage from London to Liverpool, Lancashire.

=== 3 January ===
List of shipwrecks: 3 January 1784
Ship	State	Description
Jennet	Great Britain	The ship was driven ashore and wrecked at Corton, Suffolk. Her crew were rescued. She was on a voyage from Faro, Portugal, to Hull, Yorkshire.

=== 7 January ===
List of shipwrecks: 7 January 1784
Ship	State	Description
Dorothea Wilhelmina	Stettin	The ship departed from Cork, Ireland for Bordeaux, France. No further trace, presumed foundered with the loss of all hands.

=== 8 January ===
List of shipwrecks: 8 January 1784
Ship	State	Description
City of Bruges	Great Britain	African slave trade: The ship was lost off the Island of Princess. Two hundred and ninety-one slaves were rescued.

=== 10 January ===
List of shipwrecks: 10 January 1784
Ship	State	Description
Saetia Mazzed	Flag unknown	The ship was driven ashore and wrecked at Llangennith, Glamorgan, Great Britain.

=== 11 January ===
List of shipwrecks: 11 January 1784
Ship	State	Description
El Cazador	Spain	The Brig-of-War departed from Veracruz, New Spain for New Orleans, Louisiana. She subsequently foundered in the Gulf of Mexico 50 nautical miles (93 km) south of New Orleans with the loss of all hands.

=== 15 January ===
List of shipwrecks: 15 January 1784
Ship	State	Description
Het Success van Brussel	France	The brig struck a sandbank off Chichester, Sussex, Great Britain and was consequently beached. She was on a voyage from Nantes to Dunkirk.

=== 17 January ===
List of shipwrecks: 17 January 1784
Ship	State	Description
Camel	Great Britain	The ship was wrecked on the Welsh coast with some loss of life. She was on a voyage from New York, United States, to Greenock, Renfrewshire and London.
Earl Cornwallis	Great Britain	The transport ship was driven ashore and wrecked at Rocken End, Isle of Wight.
Friends Assistance	Great Britain	The ship foundered in the Bristol Channel with the loss of all on board. She was on a voyage from Quebec, British America to London.
Sophia	Great Britain	The ship foundered in the North Sea off Alnmouth, Northumberland. She was on a voyage from Bordeaux, France, to Guernsey, Channel Islands and Leith, Lothian.

=== 18 January ===
List of shipwrecks: 18 January 1784
Ship	State	Description
Rondenella	Grand Duchy of Tuscany	The polacca sank at Gibraltar.
Senora del Rosarioa	Republic of Ragusa	The polacca was driven ashore and wrecked at St. Phillip, Gibraltar.

=== 21 January ===
List of shipwrecks: 21 January 1784
Ship	State	Description
St Joseph de Animas	Spain	The ship was driven ashore 3 nautical miles (5.6 km) from Minehead, Somerset, Great Britain. She was on a voyage from Bristol, Gloucestershire, Great Britain to Bilbao.

=== 22 January ===
List of shipwrecks: 22 January 1784
Ship	State	Description
Two Brothers	Great Britain	The sloop was driven ashore and wrecked west of Berry Head, Devon. There was one survivor of her passengers and crew. She was on a voyage from Plymouth, Devon, to Portsmouth, Hampshire.

=== 23 January ===
List of shipwrecks: 23 January 1784
Ship	State	Description
Endeavour	Great Britain	The ship foundered off Cape Clear Island, County Cork, Ireland. Her crew were rescued by a Danish ship. She was on a voyage from London to Barcelona, Spain.

=== 31 January ===
List of shipwrecks: 31 January 1784
Ship	State	Description
William and James	Ireland	The ship foundered in Dublin Bay. She was on a voyage from Belfast, County Antrim, to Dublin.

=== Unknown date ===
List of shipwrecks: Unknown date in January 1784
Ship	State	Description
Adventurer	Great Britain	The ship was driven ashore on the coast of Pembrokeshire. She was on a voyage from Dublin, Ireland, to London.
Carolina	Great Britain	The ship foundered in the English Channel. Her crew were rescued. She was on a voyage from Lisbon, Portugal, to London.
Charles	Great Britain	The ship was driven ashore on Eymouth Bar. She was on a voyage from Rye, Sussex, to Exeter, Devon.
Coalition	Great Britain	The ship was driven ashore and wrecked at Holm, Orkney Islands. She was on a voyage from Memel, Prussia, to Liverpool, Lancashire.
Commerce	Great Britain	The ship was abandoned in the Atlantic Ocean. Her crew were rescued. She was on a voyage from Saint Lucia to Liverpool.
Dorset	Great Britain	The ship was driven ashore and wrecked at Tangas, Spain. She was on a voyage from Newfoundland, British America to Barcelona, Spain.
Fortitude	Great Britain	The ship was driven ashore 2 leagues from Campveer, Dutch Republic. She was on a voyage from Leith, Lothian, to Campveer
Friendship	Prussia	The ship was driven ashore and wrecked on the coast of Northumberland, Great Britain with the loss of all but two of her crew. She was on a voyage from Königsberg to London.
Good-Intent	Great Britain	The ship was wrecked on the Isle of Wight. She was on a voyage from Amsterdam, Dutch Republic, to Southampton, Hampshire.
Hamburg Merchant	Great Britain	The ship was driven ashore at Bridlington, Yorkshire. She was on a voyage from Hull, Yorkshire to Hamburg. Hamburg Merchant was later refloated.
Hopewell	Great Britain	The ship foundered off St. Lucar, Spain. Her crew were rescued. She was on a voyage from Dublin to Cádiz, Spain.
Industry	Great Britain	The ship was sunk by ice in the James River, Virginia, United States. She was refloated and taken in to Norfolk, Virginia for repairs.
London	Great Britain	The ship was driven ashore and wrecked on the coast of Carnarvonshire. She was on a voyage from Dublin to London.
Mary and Betsey	Great Britain	The ship was sunk by ice in the James River.
Priscilla	Ireland	The ship was driven ashore at Boulogne, France.
Providence	United States	The brig was driven ashore at Londonderry. She was on a voyage from Philadelphia, Pennsylvania, to Londonderry.
Reginall	Great Britain	The ship ran aground on the Hoyle Bank. She was on a voyage from Africa to Cork, Ireland and Liverpool.
Thomas	Great Britain	The ship was driven ashore and wrecked at Abergally, Denbighshire. She was on a voyage from Liverpool to Jamaica.
Venus	Great Britain	The ship departed from Youghall, County Cork, Ireland for Southampton in mid-January. No further trace, presumed foundered with the loss of all hands.
Vrow Geloof	Dutch Republic	The ship was driven ashore on the Isle of Wight and severely damaged. She was on a voyage from Liverpool to Amsterdam. Vrow Geloof was refloated.

== February ==
=== 5 February ===
List of shipwrecks: 5 February 1784
Ship	State	Description
Volunteer	Great Britain	The ship was driven ashore and wrecked west of Dartmouth, Devon. Her crew were rescued.

=== 9 February ===
List of shipwrecks: 9 February 1784
Ship	State	Description
Lord Donegal	Ireland	The ship ran aground off Bermuda and was wrecked. She was on a voyage from Belfast, County Antrim, to Virginia, United States.

=== 17 February ===
List of shipwrecks: 17 February 1784
Ship	State	Description
James	France	The ship was lost at Savanna with the loss of all but two of her crew. She was on a voyage from Montagne to Newry, County Antrim, Ireland.

=== 22 February ===
List of shipwrecks: 22 February 1784
Ship	State	Description
Jupiter	Great Britain	The ship was driven ashore and wrecked in Filey Bay.

=== 26 February ===
List of shipwrecks: 26 February 1784
Ship	State	Description
Independence	United States	The ship was wrecked on the Atherfield Ledge, Isle of Wight, Great Britain with the loss of a crew member. She was on a voyage from the United States to London, Great Britain.

=== 27 February ===
List of shipwrecks: 27 February 1784
Ship	State	Description
Catharine	Great Britain	The ship was wrecked at Findhorn, Morayshire. She was on a voyage from Porto, Portugal, to the Moray Firth.
Jean Maria	France	The ship foundered in the Atlantic Ocean (27°24′N 58°36′W).. Her 45 crew were rescued by HMS Duc de Chartres ( (Kingdom of Great Britain) Royal Navy). Jean Marie was on a voyage from Cap François, Saint Domingo, to Boudeaux.

=== Unknown date ===
List of shipwrecks: Unknown date in February 1784
Ship	State	Description
Elizabeth & Mary	Ireland	The ship was driven ashore near Calais, France. She was on a voyage from Drammen, Norway to Cork. She was later refloated and taken in to Calais.
Fortuna	Hamburg	The ship was lost in the Elbe with the loss of two of her crew. She was on a voyage from London, Great Britain, to Hamburg.
General Greene	Great Britain	The ship was lost at Milford, Pembrokeshire. She was on a voyage from London to Liverpool, Lancashire.
Hartley	Great Britain	The ship was wrecked on the coast of the Isle of Man. Her crew were rescued.
Juno	Great Britain	The transport ship was wrecked on the Isle of Wight.
London Packet	Great Britain	The ship was driven ashore at Kingsgate, Kent. She was on a voyage from Ostend, Dutch Republic, to London. She was later refloated and taken in to Broadstairs, Kent.
Lord Campden	Great Britain	The ship foundered in Dublin Bay.
Orange	Great Britain	The ship was wrecked on the Irish coast. Her crew were rescued.
True Flemisher	Dutch Republic	The ship foundered off St. Lucar, Spain. She was on a voyage from Ostend to Cádiz, Spain.
Two Sisters	Great Britain	The ship was driven ashore at St. Mary's, Isles of Scilly. She was on a voyage from Cork to London.

== March ==
=== 4 March ===
List of shipwrecks: 4 March 1784
Ship	State	Description
Françoise Josephine	Great Britain	The ship was wrecked at Penzance, Cornwall, Great Britain. Her crew were rescued. She was on a voyage from Marseille to Havre de Grâce.
Nancy	Great Britain	The ship was wrecked off the Isles of Scilly with the loss of all on board, including opera singer Ann Cargill and her baby.

=== 13 March ===
List of shipwrecks: 13 March 1784
Ship	State	Description
Mercury	Great Britain	The ship was lost on the Jordains. She was on a voyage from Africa and Jamaica to Bristol, Gloucestershire.

=== 17 March ===
List of shipwrecks: 17 March 1784
Ship	State	Description
Mercury	Great Britain	The ship departed from Milford, Pembrokeshire for Bristol, Gloucestershire. No further trace, presumed foundered in the Bristol Channel with the loss of all hands.

=== 19 March ===
List of shipwrecks: 19 March 1784
Ship	State	Description
Eleanor	Great Britain	The ship ran aground and was wrecked in the Cattewater. She was on a voyage from London to the Isle of Man.
Friends	Great Britain	The ship was driven ashore and wrecked at the mouth of the Guadalquivir. Her crew were rescued. She was on a voyage from Bristol, Gloucestershire, to Cádiz, Spain.

=== 20 March ===
List of shipwrecks: 20 March 1784
Ship	State	Description
La Prudente	France	The ship foundered north of the Île de Batz. She was on a voyage from Dunkirk to Bordeaux.

=== 25 March ===
List of shipwrecks: 25 March 1784
Ship	State	Description
Nancy	Ireland	The ship was lost near Ferrol, Spain. She was on a voyage from Cork to the West Indies.

=== 26 March ===
List of shipwrecks: 26 March 1784
Ship	State	Description
Robert and Sally	Great Britain	The ship was lost off the Isles of Scilly. She was on a voyage from London to Lancaster, Lancashire.

=== 30 March ===
List of shipwrecks: 30 March 1784
Ship	State	Description
Charlotte	Ireland	The ship was driven ashore and wrecked at Magilligan, County Londonderry. She was on a voyage from "Drunthem" to Newry, County Antrim.

=== Unknown date ===
List of shipwrecks: Unknown date in March 1784
Ship	State	Description
Achilles	Great Britain	The whaler was wrecked on the Lemon and Oars sand, in the North Sea. Her crew were rescued by Marianne (Great Britain). Achilles was on a voyage from London to Greenland.
Betsey's Success	Great Britain	The ship was driven ashore at Tingmouth, Devon. She was on a voyage from Portsmouth, Hampshire, to Plymouth, Devon.
James	Great Britain	The ship was destroyed by fire off Beachy Head, Sussex with the loss of her captain. She was on a voyage from London to Dublin, Ireland.
Liberty	United States	The ship foundered off the Wicklow Banks, in the Irish Sea. She was on a voyage from Philadelphia, Pennsylvania, to Londonderry, Ireland and Liverpool, Lancashire, Great Britain.
London	Great Britain	The ship was driven ashore and wrecked at Flamborough Head, Yorkshire. She was on a voyage from Hull, Yorkshire to South Shields, County Durham.
Matilda	Great Britain	The ship struck the Foreness Rock, off Margate, Kent and sank. She was on a voyage from Jamaica to London.
Tobin	Great Britain	The ship was driven ashore in the River Thames. She was on a voyage from London to Nevis.
Tom	Great Britain	The ship was wrecked on the coast of Ireland. She was on a voyage from Naples, Kingdom of Sicily, to London.
Union	Great Britain	The ship was driven ashore in the Bay of Taranto. She was on a voyage from Livorno, Grand Duchy of Tuscany, to Gallipoli, Ottoman Empire.
Violet	Great Britain	The sloop was run down and sunk in the North Sea off Staithes, Yorkshire. She was on a voyage from Alnmouth, Northumberland, to London.
Weazel	Great Britain	The ship was lost near Crookhaven, County Cork, Ireland. She was on a voyage from Tortola to Liverpool.

== April ==
=== 1 April ===
List of shipwrecks: 1 April 1784
Ship	State	Description
Nelly	Ireland	The ship foundered in the Atlantic Ocean. She was on a voyage from Newry, County Antrim, to Virginia, United States.

=== 13 April ===
List of shipwrecks: 13 April 1784
Ship	State	Description
Betsey	Great Britain	The ship was driven ashore at Elsinore, Denmark.

=== 30 April ===
List of shipwrecks: 30 April 1784
Ship	State	Description
David	Great Britain	The ship was lost at New Providence, New Jersey, United States.

=== Unknown date ===
List of shipwrecks: Unknown date in April 1784
Ship	State	Description
Aurora	Great Britain	The ship was lost near Dublin, Ireland. She was on a voyage from Bristol, Gloucestershire, to Newry, County Antrim, Ireland.
Dorothy	Great Britain	The ship was lost at South Shields, County Durham.
Houghton	Great Britain	The ship foundered off Cape Finisterre, Spain. Her crew were rescued. She was on a voyage from London to Porto, Portugal.
Maria	Great Britain	The ship was lost in the Øresund. She was on a voyage from a Baltic port to Hull, Yorkshire.
Peggy's	Great Britain	The ship was lost near Cape Clear Island, County Cork, Ireland.
Polly	Great Britain	The ship departed from Jamaica for Cork, Ireland and Liverpool, Lancashire. No further trace, presumed foundered in the Atlantic Ocean with the loss of all hands.
Prince William	Hamburg	The ship struck rocks in the Tagus and was wrecked. She was on a voyage from Porto, Portugal, to Hamburg.
Priscilla	Great Britain	The ship was lost near Great Yarmouth, Norfolk with the loss of all but three of her crew. She was on a voyage from South Shields to London.
Roche	Ireland	The ship foundered. Her crew were rescued by a Portuguese vessel. She was on a voyage from St. Ubes, Portugal to Kinsale, County Cork.
Saville	Great Britain	The ship was driven ashore on the Welch Hook, in the Bristol Channel. She was refloated on 15 April and taken in to Bristol.
Tyson	Great Britain	The ship was driven ashore and wrecked at Beachy Head, Sussex. She was on a voyage from Saint Kitts to London.

== May ==
=== 9 May ===
List of shipwrecks: 9 May 1784
Ship	State	Description
HMS Crocodile	(Kingdom of Great Britain) Royal Navy	HMS Crocodile The Porcupine-class post ship ran aground and was wrecked at Prawle Point, Devon. Her 170 crew were rescued.

=== Unknown date ===
List of shipwrecks: Unknown date in May 1784
Ship	State	Description
Tom	Great Britain	The ship was wrecked on the French coast.
Union	Great Britain	The ship was lost off the Isle of Lewis. She was on a voyage from Liverpool, Lancashire, to Danzig.
William	Great Britain	The ship was driven ashore near Strangford, County Antrim and severely damaged. She was on a voyage from Liverpool to Danzig.

== June ==
=== 11 June ===
List of shipwrecks: 11 June 1784
Ship	State	Description
Success	Great Britain	The ship was wrecked on the Laugharne Sands, Carmarthenshire. She was on a voyage from Cork, Ireland to Swansey, Glamorgan.

=== 14 June ===
List of shipwrecks: 14 June 1784
Ship	State	Description
Friendship	Great Britain	The ship was wrecked on the Atherfield Ledge, Isle of Wight. She was on a voyage from Virginia, United States, to London.

=== 21 June ===
List of shipwrecks: 21 June 1784
Ship	State	Description
Joseph	Great Britain	The ship struck the Burbo Bank, in Liverpool Bay, and sank. She was on a voyage from Angola to Liverpool, Lancashire.

=== Unknown date ===
List of shipwrecks: Unknown date in June 1784
Ship	State	Description
Achilles	Great Britain	The ship was driven ashore at Urville, France. She was on a voyage from Cette, France, to Alderney, Channel Islands.
Castle	Great Britain	The ship sank on the New Sand, in the River Humber. She was later refloated and take in to Hull, Yorkshire.
Diana	Great Britain	The ship foundered off the Sunk Sand, in the North Sea off the coast of Essex. Her crew survived. She was on a voyage from Hull to Rochford, Essex.
Endeavour	Great Britain	The ship was wrecked on the coast of Portugal. Her crew were rescued. She was on a voyage from Southampton, Hampshire, to Gibraltar and Málaga, Spain.
Hazard	Great Britain	The ship sank in the River Towy. She was on a voyage from Carmarthen to Venice.
Heart of Oak	Great Britain	The ship was wrecked on the Domesnes Reef, Norway. She was on a voyage from Newcastle upon Tyne, Northumberland, to Riga, Russia.
Margaretha	Danzig	The ship foundered in the Baltic Sea. She was on a voyage from Danzig to London, Great Britain.
Stockholm Posten	Sweden	The ship foundered in the Kattegat. She was on a voyage from Stockholm to Genoa.

== July ==
=== 8 July ===
List of shipwrecks: 8 July 1784
Ship	State	Description
Race Horse	Great Britain	The ship was driven ashore and severely damaged at Padstow, Cornwall. She was on a voyage from London to Milford, Pembrokeshire and Carmarthen Race Horse was refloated and taken in to Padstow.

=== 10 July ===
List of shipwrecks: 10 July 1784
Ship	State	Description
Lucy	Great Britain	The ship foundered off Cape de Gatt, Spain. Her crew were rescued by Nancy (Great Britain). Lucy was on a voyage from Valencia, Spain, to London.

=== 18 July ===
List of shipwrecks: 18 July 1784
Ship	State	Description
Hannah	Great Britain	The ship was driven ashore and wrecked at Memel, Prussia.

=== 25 July ===
List of shipwrecks: 25 July 1784
Ship	State	Description
Le Cameiraine	France	The ship foundered off Cádiz, Spain. She was on a voyage from Cette to Guernsey, Channel Islands.

=== 30 July ===
List of shipwrecks: 30 July 1784
Ship	State	Description
Adventure	Great Britain	The ship sank in a hurricane at Jamaica.
HMS Antelope	(Kingdom of Great Britain) Royal Navy	The brig sank in a hurricane at Jamaica.
Atlantic	Great Britain	The ship was driven ashore and wrecked in a hurricane at Jamaica.
Bell	Great Britain	The ship sank in a hurricane at Jamaica.
Craigburn	Great Britain	The ship was driven ashore in a hurricane at Jamaica.
Daphne	Great Britain	The ship sank in a hurricane at Jamaica.
Dolphin	Great Britain	The ship sank in a hurricane at Jamaica.
HMS Duke of Rutland	(Kingdom of Great Britain) Royal Navy	The brig sank in a hurricane at Jamaica.
Eliza	Great Britain	The ship sank in a hurricane at Jamaica.
Endeavour	Great Britain	The ship sank in a hurricane at Jamaica.
Esther	Great Britain	The ship was driven ashore in a hurricane at Jamaica. She was later refloated.
Fly	Great Britain	The ship sank in a hurricane at Jamaica.
Fox	Great Britain	The ship was driven ashore in a hurricane at Jamaica.
Friendship	Great Britain	The ship sank in a hurricane at Jamaica.
Grand Folie	France	The ship was driven ashore in a hurricane at Jamaica.
Industry	Great Britain	The ship sank in a hurricane at Jamaica.
James	Great Britain	The ship sank in a hurricane at Jamaica.
Jott	Great Britain	The ship was driven ashore in a hurricane at Jamaica.
Kingston	Great Britain	The ship sank in a hurricane at Jamaica.
La Bische	Spain	The ship sank in a hurricane at Jamaica.
Ledman and Juno	Great Britain	The ship was driven ashore in a hurricane at Jamaica.
Marianne	Spain	The ship sank in a hurricane at Jamaica.
Mary's	Great Britain	The ship was driven ashore in a hurricane at Savannah-La-Mar, Jamaica. She was refloated on 6 August.
Patty	Great Britain	The ship sank in a hurricane at Jamaica.
Portland Planter	Great Britain	The ship was driven ashore and wrecked in a hurricane at the mouth of the Plantain Garden River, Jamaica.
Providence	Great Britain	The ship was driven ashore in a hurricane at Jamaica.
Regulator	Great Britain	The ship sank in a hurricane at Jamaica.
Savanna le Mar	Great Britain	The ship was driven ashore in a hurricane at Jamaica.
Souverain	Spain	The brig sank in a hurricane at Jamaica.
Spencer	Great Britain	The ship was driven ashore and wrecked in a hurricane at Jamaica.
St. Croix Packet	Great Britain	The ship was driven ashore in a hurricane at Jamaica.
Success	Great Britain	The ship was driven ashore in a hurricane at Jamaica.
Surprize	Great Britain	The ship sank in a hurricane at Jamaica.
Tarter	Great Britain	The ship was driven ashore in a hurricane at Jamaica.
Thompson	Great Britain	The ship sank in a hurricane at Jamaica.
Three Friends	Great Britain	The ship was driven ashore in a hurricane at Jamaica.
Three Sisters	Great Britain	The ship was driven ashore in a hurricane at Jamaica. She was later refloated.
Two Brothers	Great Britain	The ship was driven ashore in a hurricane at Jamaica.
Two Friends	Great Britain	The ship was driven ashore in a hurricane at Jamaica.
Union	Great Britain	The ship sank in a hurricane at Jamaica.
Viper	Great Britain	The ship sank in a hurricane at Jamaica.

=== Unknown date ===
List of shipwrecks: Unknown date in July 1784
Ship	State	Description
Lady Greene	Great Britain	The ship departed from Georgia, United States for London. No further trace, presumed foundered in the Atlantic Ocean with the loss of all hands.
Providence	Great Britain	The ship was lost on the Lemon and Ore Sand, in the North Sea. Her crew were rescued. She was on a voyage from the Dutch Republic to Scarborough, Yorkshire.
Richard	Great Britain	The ship was lost on "Robsnout". Jutland.
San Buona Ventura	Grand Duchy of Tuscany	The ship foundered in the Gulf of Lyon. She was on a voyage from Gibraltar to Livorno.
William & Elizabeth	Great Britain	The ship was wrecked at Ardmalin, County Donegal, Ireland. She was on a voyage from Saint Lucia to the Clyde.

== August ==
=== 17 August ===
List of shipwrecks: 17 August 1784
Ship	State	Description
Kronshtadt (Кронштадт, 'Kronstadt')	Imperial Russian Navy	The galiot ran aground and was wrecked at Pärispea Peninsula in the Gulf of Finland. Her crew were rescued.

=== Unknown date ===
List of shipwrecks: Unknown date in August 1784
Ship	State	Description
Atkinson	Great Britain	The ship foundered in the Atlantic Ocean. She was on a voyage from Jamaica to London.
Cardigan	Great Britain	The ship was driven ashore at Calais, France. She was on a voyage from Saint Petersburg, Russia, to Cardigan.
Dolly	Great Britain	The ship was lost near Hartland Point, Devon. She was on a voyage from Wadebridge, Cornwall, to Neath, Glamorgan.
John & Margaret	Ireland	The ship was driven ashore and wrecked at Baltimore, County Cork. She was on a voyage from Bordeaux, France, to Limerick.
L'Escalon	France	The ship was driven ashore at Alderney, Channel Islands.
Le Pelerin	France	The ship was driven ashore at Portland, Dorset, Great Britain.
Leviathan	Great Britain	The ship was driven ashore and wrecked in the River Thames at Deptford, Kent.
Mars	Great Britain	The ship ran aground and was severely damaged at Workington, Cumberland. She was on a voyage from Memel, Prussia, to Workington.
Westmorland	Great Britain	The ship was lost near "Wingoe". She was on a voyage from Saint Petersburg to London.

== September ==
=== 19 September ===
List of shipwrecks: 19 September 1784
Ship	State	Description
Brothers Goodwill	Great Britain	The sloop was driven ashore and wrecked near Tariffe, Spain. She was on a voyage from Falmouth, Cornwall, to Gibraltar and Málaga, Spain.

=== 22 September ===
List of shipwrecks: 22 September 1784
Ship	State	Description
Ceres	(Kingdom of Great Britain) Guernsey	The ship foundered in the Atlantic Ocean (46°25′N 10°39′W). She was on a voyage from Guernsey to the West Indies.

=== 23 September ===
List of shipwrecks: 23 September 1784
Ship	State	Description
Orian	Sweden	The ship was driven ashore and wrecked at Beachy Head, Sussex, Great Britain. She was on a voyage from Lisbon, Portugal, to Stockholm.

=== 27 September ===
List of shipwrecks: 27 September 1784
Ship	State	Description
Mary	Great Britain	The ship departed from Newfoundland, British America for Cádiz, Spain. No further trace, presumed foundered in the Atlantic Ocean with the loss of all hands.

=== 29 September ===
List of shipwrecks: 29 September 1784
Ship	State	Description
Unity	Great Britain	The ship departed from Wick, Caithness for Barcelona, Spain. No further trace, presumed foundered with the loss of all hands.

=== Unknown date ===
List of shipwrecks: Unknown date in September 1784
Ship	State	Description
Duke	Great Britain	The ship was wrecked on Bornholm, Denmark.
Isabella	Great Britain	The ship was driven ashore near Dragør, Denmark. She was on a voyage from Saint Petersburg, Russia, to London.
Kent	Great Britain	The ship was lost at Memel, Prussia.
Stokesby	Great Britain	The ship was driven ashore at "Earth Holm".

== October ==
=== 5 October ===
List of shipwrecks: 5 October 1784
Ship	State	Description
Master Thomas	Great Britain	The ship foundered in the Grand Banks of Newfoundland.

=== 27 October ===
List of shipwrecks: 27 October 1784
Ship	State	Description
Admiral	Great Britain	The sloop was wrecked at Alderney, Channel Islands with the loss of all hands.

=== Unknown date ===
List of shipwrecks: Unknown date in October 1784
Ship	State	Description
Betsey	Great Britain	The brig was wrecked at Bermuda in mid-October. Her crew were rescued. She was on a voyage from Saint Kitts to Cork, Ireland.
Delight	Great Britain	The ship was lost near "Wingo" with the loss of all but four of her crew.
Diligence	Great Britain	The ship was lost on the North Head Sand. She was on a voyage from London to Caen, France.
Experiment	Great Britain	The ship was wrecked on the coast of Jutland. She was on a voyage from "Wyburg" to King's Lynn, Norfolk.
Industry	Great Britain	The ship was lost in Cádiz Bay. Her crew were rescued. She was on a voyage from Newcastle upon Tyne, Northumberland, to Málaga, Spain.
Johanna Louisa	Sweden	The ship was wrecked on Bornholm, Denmark. She was on a voyage from Stockholm to Belfast, County Antrim, Ireland.
Neptunus	Sweden	The ship was wrecked on Anholt, Denmark. She was on a voyage from Lisbon, Portugal, to Stockholm.
Trident	Great Britain	The ship was driven ashore and wrecked at Orford, Suffolk with the loss of five of her crew. She was on a voyage from Riga, Russia, to London.
Triumph	Great Britain	The ship was wrecked on the coast of Ireland. She was on a voyage from Liverpool, Lancashire, to Christiansand, Norway.
William	Great Britain	The ship was lost on Læsø, Denmark. She was on a voyage from Saint Petersburg, Russia, to Dunbar, Lothian.

== November ==
=== 8 November ===
List of shipwrecks: 8 November 1784
Ship	State	Description
Prince Carl	(Denmark) Danish Asiatic Company	The frigate ran aground in the Vlie and was wrecked. She was on a voyage from Copenhagen to the East Indies.

=== 9 November ===
List of shipwrecks: 9 November 1784
Ship	State	Description
Pennsylvania Paquet	Great Britain	The ship foundered in the Atlantic Ocean (34°37′N 67°15′W). Her crew were rescued. She was on a voyage from London to Philadelphia, Pennsylvania, United States.

=== 11 November ===
List of shipwrecks: 11 November 1784
Ship	State	Description
Breslaw	Dutch Republic	The ship was lost near Boulogne, France with the loss of about 110 of her 130 crew. She was on a voyage from Batavia, Dutch East Indies, to Middelburg.
Three Friends	Ireland	The ship was driven ashore and wrecked in Stokes Bay. She was on a voyage from Limerick to Rotterdam, Dutch Republic.

== 19 November ==
List of shipwrecks: 13 April 1784
Ship	State	Description
Nelly and Isabel	Great Britain	The ship wrecked off Hornbæk, Denmark. The captain was rescued by eight local fishermen. The event is commemorated by a memorial anchor on the harbourfront.

=== 25 November ===
List of shipwrecks: 25 November 1784
Ship	State	Description
Prince William	Great Britain	The ship sank at Cork, Ireland. Her crew were rescued. She was on a voyage from Bristol, Gloucestershire, to Cork.

=== Unknown date ===
List of shipwrecks: Unknown date in November 1784
Ship	State	Description
Clapham	Great Britain	The ship was wrecked on Møn, Denmark. She was on a voyage from Riga, Russia, to London.
Crowe	Great Britain	The ship ran aground on the Herd Sand, in the North Sea off the coast of County Durham and was severely damaged.
Fancy	Great Britain	The ship was wrecked off The Lizard, Cornwall. She was on a voyage from Bilbao, Spain, to Amsterdam, Dutch Republic.
Flora	Great Britain	The collier was wrecked on the Herd Sand.
Freedom	Great Britain	The collier was wrecked on the Herd Sand.
Friendship	Great Britain	The ship was driven ashore near Calais, France. She was on a voyage from London to Pool, Dorset and Lisbon, Portugal.
Friendship	Great Britain	The ship departed from Jamaica for Philadelphia, Pennsylvania, United States. No further trace, presumed foundered in the Atlantic Ocean with the loss of all hands.
Hirsch	Denmark	The brigantine was wrecked at Grange Chine, Isle of Wight, Great Britain. She was on a voyage from the Canary Islands to Hamburg.
John & Jane	Great Britain	The ship was driven ashore on the Isle of Wight She was on a voyage from Málaga, Spain, to London.
John & Jane	Great Britain	The ship was wrecked on the Casquets, off Alderney, Channel Islands. Her crew were rescued. She was on a voyage from Porto, Portugal, to Exeter, Devon.
La Ville de Bruxelles	Dutch Republic	The ship foundered in the English Channel. She was on a voyage from Dunkirk, France, to Sunderland, County Durham.
Maria	Great Britain	The ship ran aground and was severely damaged at Newcastle upon Tyne, Northumberland. She was on a voyage from Newcastle upon Tyne to Tingmouth.
Mary	Ireland	The ship was wrecked on Coll, Scotland. She was on a voyage from "Drunton" to Belfast, County Antrim.
Planter Clubb	Denmark	The ship was driven ashore and wrecked 12 nautical miles (22 km) south of Elsinore.
Prince William	Great Britain	The ship sank at Cork, Ireland. She was on a voyage from London to Cork.
St. Austine	France	The ship was wrecked on the coast of Sussex, Great Britain.
True Briton	Great Britain	The ship ran aground at Tingmouth and was severely damaged. She was on a voyage from Newcastle upon Tyne to Tingmouth. True Briton was refloated after three days.
Venus	Great Britain	The ship was lost on the Noose. She was on a voyage from Dublin, Ireland, to Chepstow, Monmouthshire.
Wheel of Fortune	Great Britain	The ship was wrecked on the Gunfleet Sand, in the North Sea off the coast of Essex.

== December ==
=== 3 December ===
List of shipwrecks: 3 December 1784
Ship	State	Description
Concorde	France	The ship departed from Saint-Domingue for Dunkirk. No further trace, presumed foundered in the Atlantic Ocean with the loss of all hands.

=== 4 December ===
List of shipwrecks: 4 December 1784
Ship	State	Description
Concord	Great Britain	The ship was driven ashore near Whitby, Yorkshire. Her crew were rescued.
Dromedary	Great Britain	The ship was lost near Boulogne, France with the loss of two of her eleven crew. She was on a voyage from Dover, Kent, to Bordeaux, France.
Golston	Great Britain	The ship was driven ashore near Whitby. Her crew were rescued.
Good-Intent	Great Britain	The ship was driven ashore near Whitby. Her crew were rescued. She was refloated on 13 January 1785 and taken in to Scarborough, Yorkshire for repairs.
John	Great Britain	The ship was driven ashore near Whitby. Her crew were rescued.
Thomas and Alice	Great Britain	The ship was driven ashore near Whitby. Her crew were rescued.

=== 7 December ===
List of shipwrecks: 7 December 1784
Ship	State	Description
Friendship	Great Britain	The ship was driven ashore at Mandal, Norway, and severely damaged. Her crew were rescued. She was on a voyage from Memel, Prussia, to London. Friendship was later refloated and taken in to "Clove" for repairs.

=== 8 December ===
List of shipwrecks: 8 December 1784
Ship	State	Description
Broderick	Great Britain	The ship was driven ashore north of South Shields, County Durham.
Brothers	Great Britain	The ship was driven ashore near "Cockle Island". She was on a voyage from Saint Petersburg, Russia, to Scarborough, Yorkshire.
Charles and Jane	Great Britain	The ship was driven ashore north of South Shields.
Delight	Great Britain	The ship was driven ashore at Whitby, Yorkshire.
Ellis and Mary	Great Britain	The ship was driven ashore north of South Shields.
Fame	Great Britain	The ship was driven ashore north of South Shields.
Friendship	Great Britain	The ship was driven ashore north of South Shields.
Good-Intent	Great Britain	The ship was driven ashore north of South Shields.
Iris	Great Britain	The ship was driven ashore north of South Shields.
Isabella	Great Britain	The ship was driven ashore south of South Shields. Her crew survived.
Jewert	Great Britain	The ship was driven ashore south of South Shields.
Joseph	Great Britain	The ship was driven ashore south of South Shields.
Judith and Jane	Great Britain	The ship was driven ashore north of South Shields.
Leighton	Great Britain	The ship was driven ashore north of South Shields.
Mary	Great Britain	The ship was driven ashore north of South Shields.
Newcastle	Great Britain	The ship was driven ashore south of South Shields.
Northumberland	Great Britain	The ship was driven ashore north of South Shields.
Pallas	Great Britain	The ship was driven ashore south of South Shields.
Providence	Great Britain	The ship was driven ashore north of South Shields.
Prudence	Great Britain	The ship struck the pier at Whitby and was severely damaged.
Richard	Great Britain	The ship was driven ashore north of South Shields.
Spring	Great Britain	The ship was driven ashore north of South Shields.
Tay	Great Britain	The ship was driven ashore and wrecked at Hartlepool, County Durham, She was on a voyage from London to Perth and Dundee, Perthshire.
Venus	Great Britain	The ship was driven ashore north of South Shields.

=== 11 December ===
List of shipwrecks: 11 December 1784
Ship	State	Description
President	Great Britain	The ship was driven ashore and wrecked between Cowes and Yarmouth, Isle of Wight.

=== 12 December ===
List of shipwrecks: 2 December 1784
Ship	State	Description
Elizabeth	Great Britain	The ship foundered in the Atlantic Ocean (49°30′N 8°30′W).

=== 14 December ===
List of shipwrecks: 14 December 1784
Ship	State	Description
Wilson	Great Britain	The ship struck a rock at Waterford, Ireland and was severely damaged. She was on a voyage from New York, United States, to Liverpool, Lancashire. Wilson was later taken in to the River Suir.

=== 20 December ===
List of shipwrecks: 20 December 1784
Ship	State	Description
Vlieger	Dutch Republic	The brigantine was wrecked on Læsø, Denmark with the loss of all but three of her crew.

=== 21 December ===
List of shipwrecks: 21 December 1784
Ship	State	Description
Hope	Great Britain	The ship was run into by Adventure (Great Britain) and was wrecked. She was on a voyage from New Providence, New Jersey, United States to London.

=== 25 December ===
List of shipwrecks: 25 December 1784
Ship	State	Description
Andrew Heylmand	Dutch Republic	The ship was wrecked on Bornholm, Denmark with the loss of all hands. She was on a voyage from Memel, Prussia, to Amsterdam, North Holland, Dutch Republic.
Hedwig	Prussia	The ship was wrecked on Bornholm with the loss of all but two of her crew. She was on a voyage from Memel to Amsterdam.
Unnamed	Great Britain	The brig was wrecked on Bornholm with the loss of all hands.
Unnamed	Flag unknown	The ship was wrecked on Bornholm with the loss of all nads.

=== 28 December ===
List of shipwrecks: 28 December 1784
Ship	State	Description
Esther	Great Britain	The ship was driven ashore in the Hammer Sound, Norway.

=== 30 December ===
List of shipwrecks: 30 December 1784
Ship	State	Description
Unnamed	Flag unknown	The crewless ship was driven ashore and wrecked in the Isles of Scilly, Great Britain.

=== Unknown date ===
List of shipwrecks: Unknown date in December 1784
Ship	State	Description
Amity	Great Britain	The ship foundered in the Atlantic Ocean off Land's End, Cornwall. Her crew were rescued. She was on a voyage from London to Liverpool, Lancashire.
Ann	Great Britain	The ship was driven ashore at Brest, France. Her crew were rescued. She was on a voyage from London to Cádiz, Spain.
Ann	Great Britain	The ship foundered in the Atlantic Ocean. Her crew were rescued by a French brig. She was on a voyage from Maryland, United States, to London.
Argo	Great Britain	The ship was driven ashore and wrecked at Skagen, Denmark. with the loss of three of her crew.
Baltick Merchant	Great Britain	The ship was driven ashore on the coast of Lincolnshire. She was on a voyage from Norway to London. She was refloated in January 1785 and resumed her voyage.
Catharine	Great Britain	The ship was wrecked at "Sleeden Point".
Conqueror	Great Britain	The ship was wrecked near Hartlepool, County Durham.
Eliza	Great Britain	The ship was driven ashore near Blyth, Northumberland.
Elizabeth	Great Britain	The ship was lost near Texel, Dutch Republic. She was on a voyage from Amsterdam, Dutch Republic, to Saint Petersburg, Russia.
Enterprize	Great Britain	The ship was wrecked on the Sandhammer. She was on a voyage from Memel to London.
Expedition	Ireland	The ship was driven ashore in Rattray Bay. She was on a voyage from Saint Petersburg to Newry, County Antrim. She was later refloated and taken in to Peterhead, Aberdeenshire.
Experiment	Great Britain	The ship foundered in the Atlantic Ocean. Her crew were rescued by Dartmouth (Great Britain).
Hamburg Merchant	Great Britain	The ship was wrecked on the coast of Sweden. She was on a voyage from Memel to the Straits of Gibraltar.
Hansa	Hamburg	The ship was wrecked on Schiermonnikoog, Dutch Republic with the loss of all but three of her crew. She was on a voyage from London to Hamburg.
Hartwig	Prussia	The ship was wrecked on Bornholm with the loss of all but two of her crew. She was on a voyage from Memel to Amsterdam.
Hazard	France	The ship was wrecked on the coast of Provence. She was on a voyage from Dunkirk to Genoa.
Industry	Great Britain	The ship was wrecked at Memel.
Liberty	Great Britain	The ship foundered off the coast of Norway. Her crew were rescued by Betsey (Great Britain). Liberty was on a voyage from Memel to London.
Mary	Ireland	The ship was wrecked on the coast of Ireland with the loss of all hands. She was on a voyage from Virginia, United States, to Londonderry.
Mary Gedruth	Lübeck	The ship was driven ashore in the Bay of Lübeck 3 leagues (9 nautical miles (17 km) from Travemünde. She was on a voyage from Saint Petersburg to Lübeck.
Mersey	Great Britain	The ship was destroyed by fire. She was on a voyage from Danzig to Liverpool, Lancashire.
Museew	Danzig	The ship was wrecked on Stever Island, Denmark. She was on a voyage from Danzig to Whitby, North Riding of Yorkshire, Great Britain.
Nathaniel	Great Britain	The ship was lost at Bay Bulls, Newfoundland. Her crew were rescued.
Neptune	Great Britain	The ship was wrecked at Memel. She was on a voyage from London to a Baltic port.
Polly	Great Britain	The ship was lost at the Rosses, Ireland with the loss of her captain.
Queen	Great Britain	The ship was wrecked at Memel.
Susanna	Great Britain	The ship was lost off Wicklow, Ireland. She was on a voyage from New York, United States, to Glasgow, Renfrewshire.
Winlatory	Great Britain	The ship ran aground on the Herd Sand, in the North Sea off the coast of County Durham. She was refloated after several days.

== Unknown date ==
List of shipwrecks: Unknown date in 1784
Ship	State	Description
Africa	Great Britain	African slave trade: The ship sank at Saint Vincent. Her slaves were rescued. She was on a voyage from Africa to the West Indies.
America	Great Britain	The ship was lost at Charleston, South Carolina, United States. She was on a voyage from the Clyde to Charleston.
Ann	Great Britain	The ship foundered with the loss of all hands.
Bermuda Packet	Great Britain	The ship foundered in the Atlantic Ocean. Her crew were rescued by Lord Hood (Great Britain). Bermuda Packet was on a voyage from Philadelphia, Pennsylvania, United States to Newfoundland, British America.
Betsey	United States	The ship was lost near Cape Fear, North Carolina, United States before 27 April. She was on a voyage from Charleston to North Carolina and Antigua.
Charming Nancy	Great Britain	The ship was driven ashore and wrecked at Cape May, New Jersey, United States. She was on a voyage from Philadelphia to the West Indies.
Champion	Great Britain	The ship was lost at Bonny, Nigeria. She was on a voyage from Liverpool, Lancashire, to Africa.
Cox	Great Britain	The ship was wrecked on Assateague Island, Virginia, United States. She was on a voyage from Barbados to Philadelphia.
Dispatch	Great Britain	The ship was wrecked off the Bahamas. She was on a voyage from Jamaica to New York, United States.
Euphrates	Great Britain	The ship was wrecked on a reef off the east coast of Barbados.
Fanciculetta	Great Britain	The ship was lost at Nantucket, Massachusetts, United States. She was on a voyage from Tobago to an American port.
Fantasque	French Navy	The Lion-class ship of the line foundered off the coast of Aquitaine with the loss of all 500 people on board.
Friendship	Ireland	The ship's crew mutinied and deliberately ran the ship ashore at Cap-François, Saint Domingue, where she was wrecked. She was on a voyage from Dublin to Philadelphia.
Friendship	Great Britain	The ship foundered in the Atlantic Ocean. Her crew were rescued by Doe (Great Britain). Friendship was on a voyage from Charleston, South Carolina, United States to London.
Good Intent	Great Britain	The ship foundered whilst on a voyage from Cádiz, Spain, to Newfoundland. Her crew were rescued.
Hermoine Packet	Great Britain	The ship was wrecked on Cape Sable Island, Nova Scotia, British America.
Hope	Ireland	The ship was lost at Antigua. She was on a voyage from Belfast, County Antrim, to the Leeward Islands.
Hope	Great Britain	The sloop capsized in the Atlantic Ocean.
Industry	Great Britain	The ship was lost at Curaçao. She was on a voyage from Saint Kitts to Curaçao.
Liberté Belgique	Dutch East India Company	The East Indiaman was wrecked on the Dutch coast in late December.
James	Great Britain	The ship capsized and sank in the Atlantic Ocean. She was on a voyage from Africa to Liverpool.
John Frederick	Great Britain	The ship was wrecked on the American coast.
Julius Cæsar	Great Britain	The ship was lost at Cape Cod, Massachusetts, United States. She was on a voyage from Cádiz to New England, United States.
Juno	Great Britain	The ship was lost on the Musquito Shore.
Lady Clausen	Great Britain	African slave trade: The ship was wrecked on the east coast of Cuba. Her slaves were rescued. She was on a voyage from Saint Thomas, Virgin Islands to Havana, Cuba.
Lucy	Great Britain	The ship was lost near Venice. She was on a voyage from London to Venice.
Major	British East India Company	The East Indiaman was destroyed by fire at Bengal, India.
Mary Ann	Great Britain	The ship was lost near Plymouth, Massachusetts, United States. She was on a voyage from Bristol, Gloucestershire, to Boston, Massachusetts.
Mastborough	Great Britain	The ship was driven ashore on Long Island, Rhode Island, United States and severely damaged. She was on a voyage from London to New York.
Molly	(Kingdom of Great Britain) Jersey	The ship foundered in the Atlantic Ocean. She was on a voyage from Lisbon, Portugal, to Newfoundland.
North-Briton	Great Britain	The ship foundered in the Atlantic Ocean. Her crew were rescued. She was on a voyage from London to New York.
Peace	Great Britain	The ship was lost on Hog Island, United States. She was on a voyage from London to Virginia.
Pilgrim	United States	The schooner was lost at Ocracock, North Carolina before 7 April. She was on a voyage from Charleston to Antigua
Pulvérisateur	French Navy	The fireship was wrecked.
Ranger	Great Britain	The ship was wrecked on a reef off Tortola before 10 September.
Resolution	Dutch Republic	The ship was lost near Newbury Port, Massachusetts, United States. She was on a voyage from Amsterdam to New England, United States.
Richard	United States	The ship was lost off Sandy Hook, New Jersey before 9 March.
San Francisco de Paula	Spanish Navy	The 74 gun ship-of-the-line was destroyed by fire at "Carraca".
Santo Antonio	Portugal	The ship sank in the River Ganges, India. She was on a voyage from Bombay to Bengal.
St. George	Great Britain	The ship foundered in the Bay of Fundy with the loss of all hands. She was on a voyage from Halifax, Nova Scotia, to Penobscot, Maine, United States.
Suffolk	Great Britain	The ship sank at Charleston. She was on a voyage from Charleston to London.
Swift	Great Britain	The ship was lost at Charleston. She was on a voyage from Saint Augustine, Florida, New Spain to Charleston.
Three Crowns	Great Britain	The ship was lost near Egg Harbour, New Jersey, United States with the loss of eleven lives. She was on a voyage from Bristol to Philadelphia, Pennsylvania, United States.
Three Sisters	Great Britain	The transport ship foundered off the Cape of Good Hope. Her crew were rescued. She was on a voyage from the East Indies to Portsmouth, Hampshire.
Twillingate	Great Britain	The ship was lost at Fogo, Newfoundland. She was on a voyage from Pool, Dorset to Newfoundland.
Two Friends	Great Britain	The ship foundered in the Atlantic Ocean. She was on a voyage from Maryland, United States, to London.
Whitby Warrior	Great Britain	The ship was wrecked on Albaco Island. She was on a voyage from St. Augustine, Florida, British America to St. Mark's.
