= Antelope (ship) =

Numerous ships have sailed under the name Antelope. Notable ones include:

- Antelope (1780 packet ship), a packet ship launched in 1780, most famous for a desperate single-ship action in 1793 in which she captured a much larger French privateer
- Antelope (1781 EIC packet ship), a packet ship built for the British East India Company (EIC) in 1781 that made one voyage that ended when she was wrecked in 1783 off Ulong, and that resulted in the first sustained European contact with Palau
- Antelope (1797 ship) was built at Batavia in 1792 and captured in 1797. She sailed from London on 20 May 1798 to gather slaves from Africa. She embarked slaves at Anomabu, and later was reported off Grenada on her way to Jamaica. Her subsequent fate is currently unknown.
- Antelope (1798 ship) was a French vessel launched in 1795 and captured circa 1798. She sailed primarily as a West Indiaman until circa 1804 when Daniel Bennett purchased her and sent her out as a privateer operating off South America, first in the Atlantic and then the Pacific. A Spanish armed merchantman captured her in 1806, killing her master.
- Antelope was a brig of 188 tons (bm), launched in America in 1795. In the 1800s, she traded between Cowes and Dunkirk. Lloyd's List reported on 28 December 1804 that Antelope, Curran, master, from Virginia to Dunkirk, was upset at Calais. Her crew was saved and the cargo was expected to be saved. The registers carried stale information for some years thereafter.
- Antelope (1802 slave ship) was a slave ship whose capture in 1820 gave rise to a notable legal case concerning the United States of America's slave trade.
- Antelope (1807 ship) was launched at Nantes in 1804 under another name. She was taken in prize and condemned in the High Court of Admiralty on 1 June 1807. She sailed to the Pacific, possibly as a whaler, where she captured a Spanish vessels. In 1811 she made one voyage to India for the British East India Company. She next traded with South America and the Mediterranean. A United States privateer captured her in 1814, but the Royal Navy quickly recaptured her. She was probably broken up circa 1824.
- Antelope (1841 brig) was a brig of 370 tons, built in East Boston by Samuel Hall for Russel & Co.
- Antelope of Boston (1851 ship) was a clipper ship launched in 1851 and wrecked in 1858
- Antelope (shipwreck) was a cargo steamship launched in 1861 that sank in Lake Superior in 1897
- Antelope (steamboat) was a steamboat that operated on the southern Oregon coast from 1886 to about 1908
- SS Empire Antelope was built as Ophis in 1919, renamed Empire Antelope in 1941, and sunk in November 1942

== Naval vessels ==
- HCS Antelope (1793), a brig of 199 tons (bm), and 12-14 guns, was launched at Bombay Dockyard for the Bombay Marine, the British East India Company's naval arm. She was sold after 1830.
- HMS Antelope, one of ten vessels that have served the Royal Navy
- USS Antelope, one of three vessels that have served the United States Navy
