= HMS Antelope =

Eleven ships of the Royal Navy have been named HMS Antelope, after the Antelope:

- English ship Antelope (1546) was a galleass carrying between 38 and 44 guns. She was launched in 1546, rebuilt three times and was burned by parliamentarian sailors at Hellevoetsluis in 1649.
- English ship Antelope (1652) was a 56-gun third-rate great frigate launched in 1652 and wrecked later that year
- HMS Antelope (1660) was a 40-gun fourth-rate frigate launched in 1653 as Preston and renamed in 1660. She was sold in 1693.
- HMS Antelope (1703) was a 54-gun fourth rate launched in 1703. She was rebuilt in 1741 and was sold in 1783.
- HMS Antelope (1784) was a 14-gun sloop purchased in 1784, and lost in a hurricane later that year.
- HMS Antelope (1802) was a 50-gun fourth rate launched in 1802. She was used as a troopship from 1818, was placed on harbour service from 1824 and was broken up in 1845.
- HMS Antelope was a 14-gun schooner, the ex-Spanish prize Antelope captured and purchased in 1808 and taken into service as HMS Firefly. She was later renamed to Antelope, and was broken up in 1814.
- HMS Antelope (1846) was an Antelope-class iron paddle sloop launched in 1846 and sold in 1883.
- HMS Antelope (1893) was an Alarm-class torpedo gunboat launched in 1893. She was used for harbour service from 1910 and was sold in 1919.
- HMS Antelope (H36) was an A-class destroyer launched in 1929 and sold in 1946.
- HMS Antelope (F170) was a Type 21 frigate launched in 1972 and bombed and sunk in the Falklands War in 1982.

== Battle honours ==
Ships named Antelope have earned the following battle honours:

- Armada, 1588
- Lowestoft, 1665
- Four Days' Battle, 1666
- Orfordness, 1666
- Sole Bay, 1672
- Marbella, 1705
- Aquilon, 1757
- Atlantic, 1939−44
- Bismarck, 1941
- Malta Convoys, 1942
- North Africa, 1942−43
- Falkland Islands, 1982

== See also ==
- Antelope (1780 packet ship) was a 6-gun West Indian Post Office Packet Service packet ship that was captured in 1781, 1782, and 1794.
- HCS Antelope (1793), a brig of 199 tons (bm), and 12-14 guns, was launched at Bombay Dockyard in 1793 for the Bombay Marine, the British East India Company's naval arm. She was sold after 1830.
- Antelope is a fictitious 18th century privateer in Stan Rogers's song Barrett's Privateers
