= Post Office Packet Service =

British government-operated mail and cargo transport service

The Post Office Packet Service dates to Tudor times and ran until 1823, when the Admiralty assumed control of the service. Originally, the Post Office used packet ships to carry mail packets to and from British embassies, colonies and outposts. The vessels generally also carried bullion, private goods and passengers. The ships were usually lightly armed and relied on speed for their security. However, Britain was at war almost continuously during the 18th and early 19th centuries with the result that packet ships did get involved in naval engagements with enemy warships and privateers, and were occasionally captured.

== Origins ==
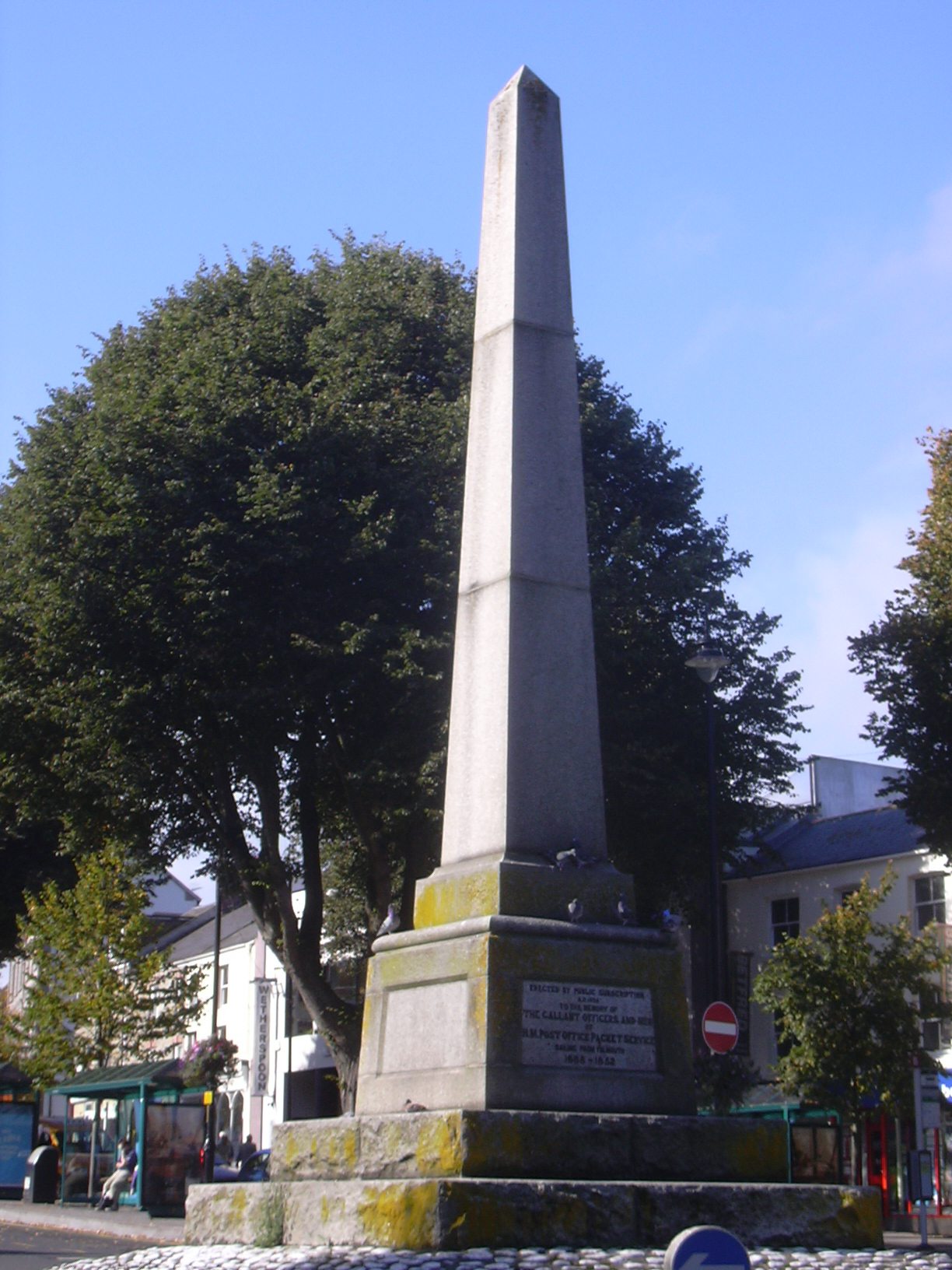
Falmouth Packet Service memorial, The Moor

Packet boats, offering a regular scheduled mail service, had been in use for the sea route between Holyhead and Dublin since at least 1598, providing a mail connection between Britain and Ireland. Furthermore, during Essex's campaign, additional packets were run out of Falmouth and Milford Haven, sailing to and from Waterford on the south coast of Ireland; but these services were relatively short-lived (albeit the Milford-Waterford route would be revived during the Commonwealth period in the 1650s).

For letters to and from continental Europe, a different approach was taken: the post was entrusted to messengers, who would then make their own arrangements for conveying it across the Channel and beyond. This messenger service was far from reliable, so in the 1630s Thomas Witherings set about establishing a regular Dover-Calais packet service and entered into negotiations with Flemish and French postmasters-general to negotiate for effective cross-border carriage of letters for mutual benefit of the nations concerned (and the messengers were promptly dismissed).

To begin with, letters to and from Holland went via France; but in 1668 a regular packet service was set up in addition to run between Harwich and Helvoetsluys. By the 1680s packets were running to Ostend or Nieuport from Dover, as well as to Calais. The route to France, however, was then closed in 1689 following the start of the Nine Years' War.

In 1690 the packet service consisted of eleven vessels: three for the service to and from Ireland, two for Holland, two for Flanders and two for France (albeit the latter service was suspended). The other two packet boats worked out of Deal, and provided a mail service for warships and merchant vessels anchored in the Downs. In place of the Dover-Calais route, a packet service was established between Falmouth and Corunna in north-west Spain.

At the outbreak of the War of the Spanish Succession, in 1702, the service to France was again closed and the Iberian route was diverted to Lisbon. Also at this time, Edmund Dummer undertook to run a monthly packet service between Falmouth and the West Indies; problems arose, however (leaving Dummer bankrupt) and a West Indies service was not resumed until the 1740s.

In 1744 there were four boats on the Falmouth station, four at Harwich, six at Dover, two based at Gibraltar and two at Minorca (while additional vessels, at various stations, provided packet services with Ireland, the Downs and several island communities). The following year additional vessels were procured for the resumption of the service between Falmouth and the West Indies, and before long packet ships were sailing from Falmouth to Buenos Ayres, Colombia, Cuba, Mexico and San Domingo.

== Routes ==
=== Atlantic and Mediterranean ===
- North, Central and South America and the Caribbean Islands,
- Spain, Portugal, Gibraltar, Italy, Greece (Corfu was a British Protectorate from 1815 to 1864), Egypt.

=== Northern Europe ===
Routes ran at various times from Dover in Kent and Harwich in Essex to Calais, the Hook of Holland, Heligoland and Gothenburg.

=== Ireland ===
The usual packet route was from Holyhead in Anglesey, Wales to Dublin, or Dún Laoghaire (previously Kingstown). A second routes between Waterford and Milford Haven was revived in 1653 by the Council of State. A new road was built by Thomas Telford to link London with Holyhead over the Menai Suspension Bridge. There was also a route to the Isle of Man

== Stations ==
The stations from which the packet ships departed were: Dover, Harwich, Great Yarmouth, Falmouth, Plymouth, Milford Haven and Holyhead.

=== Falmouth Station ===
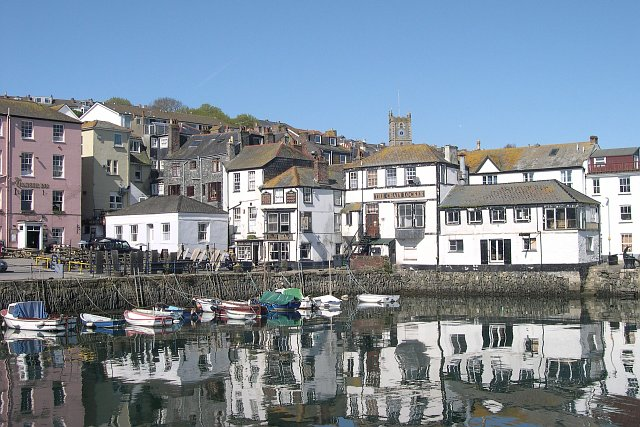
Custom House Quay, Falmouth, destination of the Falmouth Mail Packet ships

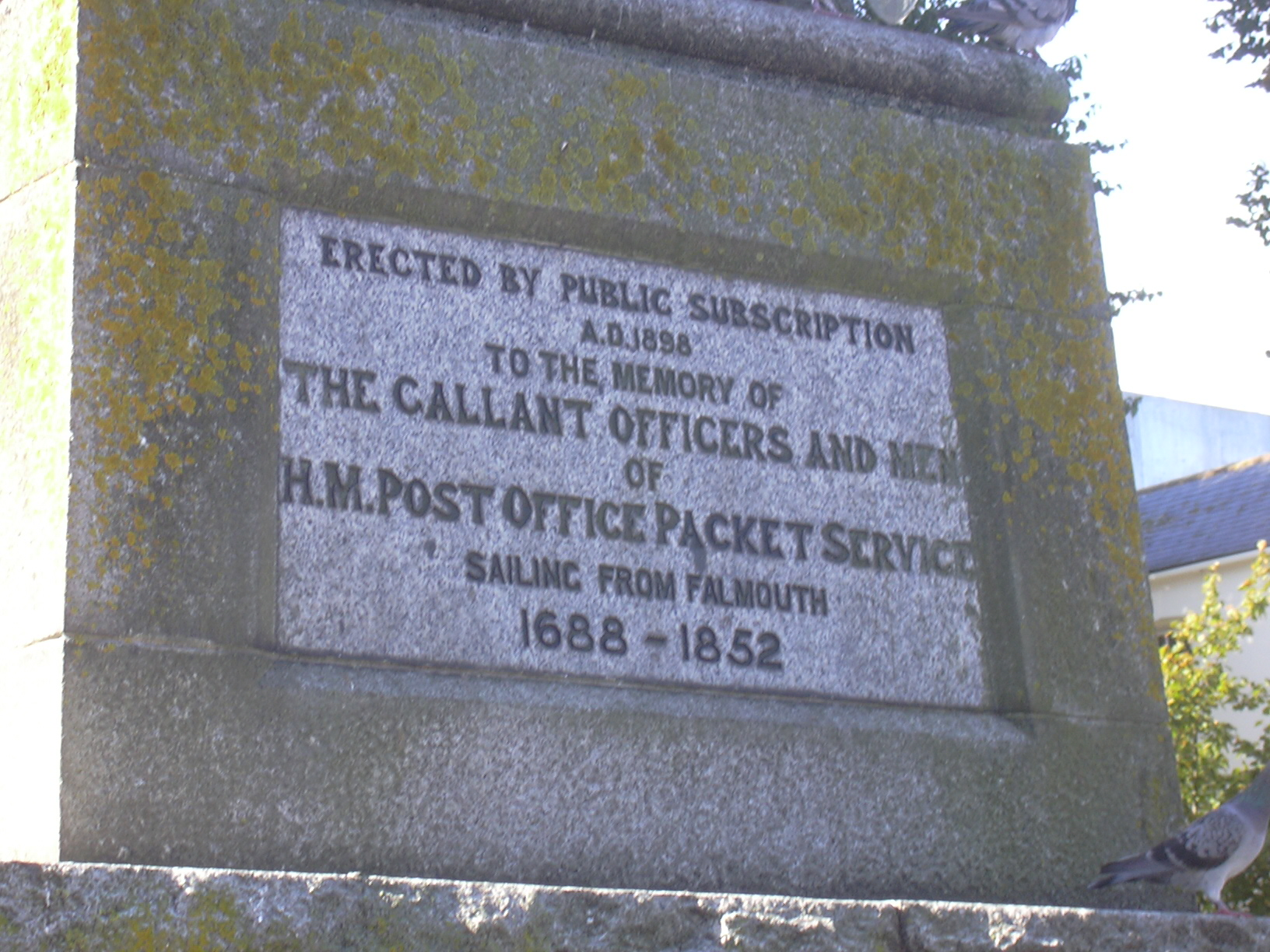
Inscription on Falmouth Packet Service memorial

Falmouth was a packet station since around 1688 and the station has been the subject of studies by Arthur Norway (1895), Susan Gay (1903) and Tony Pawlyn (2003). During most of the 18th century and the early part of the 19th century, Britain was at war. The locale of Falmouth in Cornwall was favourable to the successful transmission of mail through the gauntlet of enemy naval ships and privateers. The value of the Falmouth Station grew as Napoleon implemented his Continental System, attempting to exclude British trade and communications with mainland Europe.

In 1810 men of the packet service at Falmouth mutinied over pay levels. Previously, the sailors had been authorised to trade for their own account. When this was banned as smuggling, they objected to the resulting loss of income.

In punishment for the refusal to man ships, the Post Office moved the Falmouth Packet Station to Plymouth. Much lobbying of the Postmaster General and HM Treasury by a delegation from Falmouth and by Cornwall's forty-four members of Parliament followed. After considering Fowey as an alternative station, the Post Office agreed to return the service to Falmouth in January 1811.

In 1843, Falmouth merchants persuaded H.M. Government not to move the packet station to Southampton, which was now served by a railway. The last packet arrived at Falmouth on 30 April 1851, and the Cornwall Railway did not reach Falmouth until 1863.

== Wartime service ==
Packets would sometimes encounter hostile vessels, with greater or lesser success.

The French captured His Majesty's packet Antelope three times, but in between, on 1 December 1793, she fought and captured a French privateer, the Atlante. Outgunned, outnumbered, and with all three officers dead or wounded, Antelope's crew triumphed after a desperate fight.

On 21 June 1798, the packet Princess Royal, under the command of Captain J. Skinner, was carrying mail to New York when she encountered a French privateer brig. The packet was armed with six cannons, and had 49 people on board, some of whom were passengers and boys. Still, a two-hour engagement ensued during which the passengers joined in by firing small arms. Eventually, the privateer gave up and sailed away. Later information suggested that the privateer was the Avanture, of Bordeaux, which was armed with fourteen long 4-pounder guns and two 12-pounder guns, and had a crew of 85 men. In the engagement she suffered two killed and four wounded, and was so shot up that she had to return to her home port for repairs.

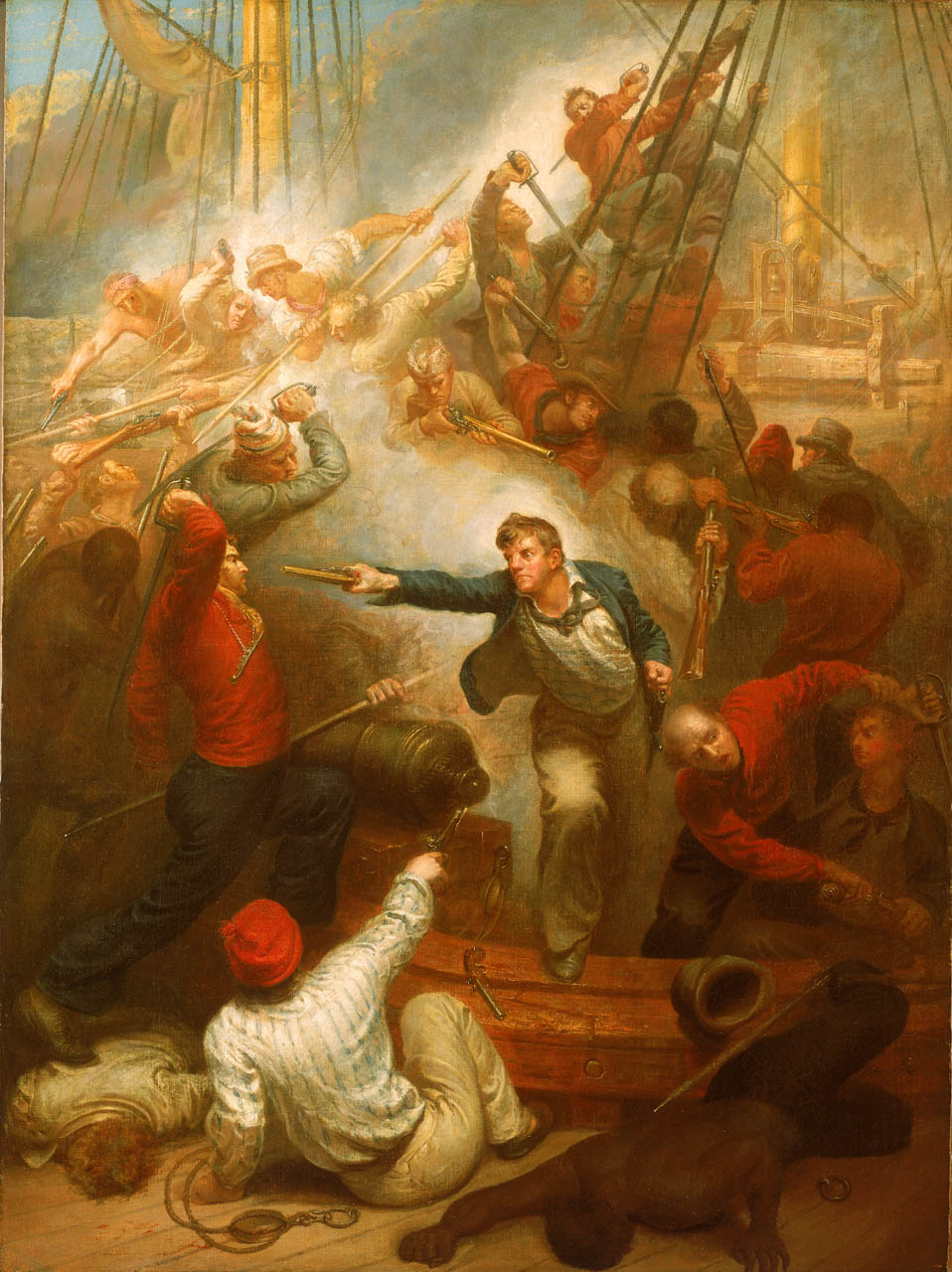
"Captain William Rogers Capturing the Jeune Richard, 1 October 1807", by Samuel Drummond

Then on 15 May 1800, Captain Newman, late of the packet Jane, captured the Lisbon packet Marquis of Kildare. When a French privateer captured the Jane, it permitted Newman and some of his crew to go to Lisbon. On 29 April they sailed from Lisbon aboard the Marquis of Kildare, which was bound for Falmouth. Two weeks later, a French privateer captured the Marquis of Kildare and took off her captain, officers, and almost all the crew, except for three who hid themselves; Newman and four of his crew, as well as three passengers, a woman and her sick brother and father, also stayed on board. The privateer put on board a prize master and 17 crew, who steered her for Corunna. When they were about six leagues from Corunna, Newman, who had managed to secure a pistol, and his crew, who secured a cutlass and boarding pikes, managed to chase the French crew from the deck and to seize the vessel. Newman then put the French prize crew in a long boat, with provisions, and set them adrift. After further tribulations, the Marquis of Kildare reached St Ives, Cornwall, on 31 May.

Another particularly notable combat occurred on 1 October 1807 when the packet ship Windsor Castle resisted and then captured the more heavily armed French privateer Jeune Richard. The action was sanguinary and the heroism of the British crew drew press attention.

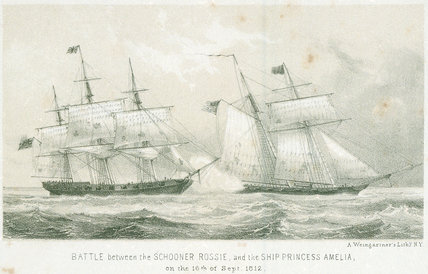
Rossie capturing Princess Amelia, 1812

At the start of the War of 1812, Joshua Barney in the American privateer Rossie captured the mail packet Princess Amelia after a short but intense fight on 16 September 1812. Rossie was armed with ten 12-pounder guns and one long 9-pounder on a pivot, and had a crew of 95; Princess Amelia was armed with four 6-pounders and two 9-pounders, and had a crew of 28. Princess Amelia had to strike after she had lost three men killed, including her captain, and 11 men wounded.

== Admiralty control ==
In 1823, the Admiralty took over the administration of the Packet Service. It replaced older packet vessels with naval ships made redundant by the peace that had followed the end of the Napoleonic wars.

Steam vessels started to replace sail in the 1830s and this enabled a more regular and predictable service to be operated.

Over time, there was a consolidation of packet stations. Most routes were transferred to Southampton, which had been linked to London by railway. Other ports handling packets include Liverpool (from 1840) and Plymouth (from 1850).

In 1850, the government disbanded the Packet Service. Instead, the Post Office contracted for the carriage of mail with companies running other regularly timetabled services. Ships with the contract to carry mail were designated Royal Mail Ship. This change was administered by Admiral Parry.

== Later developments ==
Packet came to mean a regularly scheduled ship, carrying passengers, as in packet trade, whether or not official Post Office mail was carried.

== See also ==
- Packet trade
- Packet boat
