= Antelope Valley (disambiguation) =

The Antelope Valley is a region of Southern California, United States.

Antelope Valley may also refer to:

== Other places ==
=== California and Nevada ===
- Antelope Valley (California-Nevada)
- Antelope Valley (Elko-White Pine Counties)
- Antelope Valley (Eureka County)
- Antelope Valley (Lander County)
- Antelope Valley (Nevada)

=== Utah ===
- Antelope Valley (southwest Millard County, Utah)

=== Wyoming ===
- Antelope Valley-Crestview, Wyoming

== Educational organisations ==
- Antelope Valley College, in Lancaster, California
- Antelope Valley High School, in Lancaster, California

== Other ==
- Antelope Valley Station, a coal-fired power plant in North Dakota
