= HMS Duke of Rutland (1784) =

Brig of the Royal Navy

History

Great Britain
- Name: HMS Duke of Rutland
- Acquired: April 1784
- Fate: Sunk on 30 July 1784

General characteristics
- Propulsion: Sails
- Sail plan: Brig
- Armament: 6 guns

HMS Duke of Rutland was a 6-gun brig of the Royal Navy. She was originally a mercantile brig, purchased in April 1784 at Jamaica by Vice-Admiral Gambier and commissioned that year under Lieutenant Brown. A hurricane on 30 July 1784 at Jamaica wrecked her.

Admiral Gambier had acquired two brigs but the Admiralty countermanded their purchase and ordered Gambier to sell them. In July the two, Duke of Rutland and Antelope, came into Port Royal to be prepared for sale. Duke of Rutland was anchored off the port when the hurricane on 30 July caused here to drag her anchors and to ground on the boathouse slip. When she was pulled off it was found that she had broken her back. She was sold locally for £220. The same hurricane sank Antelope on the western wharf.
