= Antelope (1780 packet) =

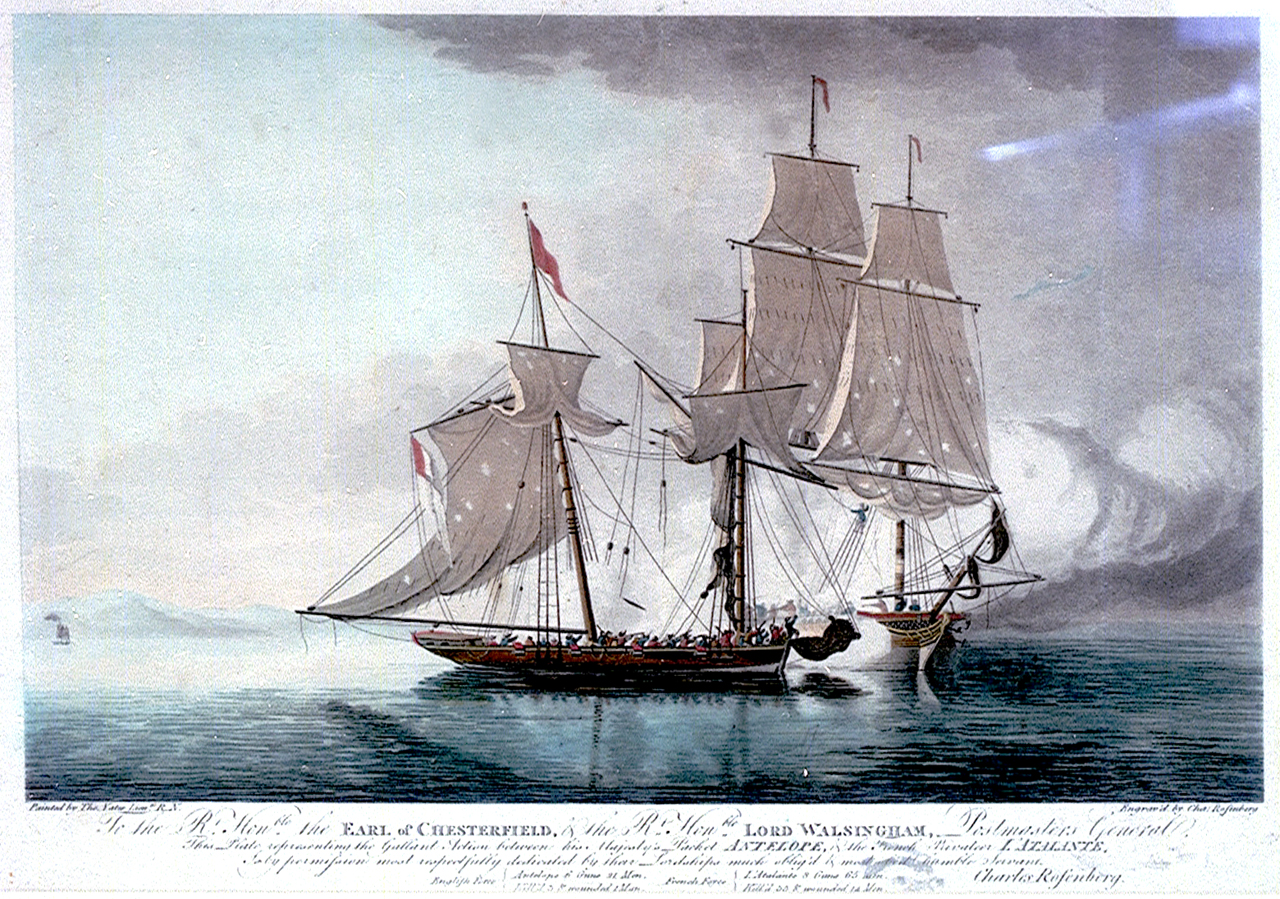
- Gallant Action between his Majesty's Packet Antelope, & the French Privateer Atalante, Lieutenant Thomas Yates, National Maritime Museum

History

Great Britain
- Name: Antelope
- Operator: Post Office Packet Service
- Builder: Thames
- Launched: 1780
- Fate: Captured 1793

General characteristics
- Tons burthen: 190, or 204 (bm)
- Complement: 27
- Armament: 6 x 3-pounder guns

Antelope was a West Indian packet ship launched in 1780. The French captured her in 1781, 1782, and finally, in 1794. She is most famous for a desperate single-ship action in 1793 when her crew captured a better-armed French privateer with a much larger crew.

== Career ==
The French first captured her in 1781, and then ransomed her. They then captured her again on 10 October 1782. They took her into Nantes, from where Captain William Kempthorne re-purchased her on 4 April 1783, and took her under command.

On 1 December 1793, Antelope was sailing without Captain Kempthorne, who had remained in Falmouth due to illness, and was off Cumberland Harbour, Cuba when she sighted two privateers. Obeying orders, Antelope headed back to port to avoid trouble, but the next day the wind failed and one of the privateers, Atlante (of eight 3-pounder guns), was able to come alongside and attack. Antelope was armed with six 3-pounder (1.4 kg) guns and manned by a crew of 21. (Note: Antelope had left with 27 men, but four, including the second mate, had died of fever, and two were not fit for duty. However, there were also several passengers on board, who took part in the fight, with one being killed. The dead passenger was M. Le Roy de la Grange, of Santo Domingo, secretary to Colonel Loppinot, who was also a passenger.) Atlante, a French privateer from Charleston, South Carolina, had a crew of 65, consisting of Frenchmen, Irishmen, and Americans.

During the battle, both of Antelope's officers were killed or wounded. Before he fell, the master, Mr. Edward Curtis, turned the two bow guns, double shotted, to cover the bow, and fired them at the first boarding party, killing and wounding some 15 men; he fell shortly thereafter. Command fell on Boatswain John Pascoe, who then led the crew in repelling the boarding parties. Antelope's crew repeatedly threw back the privateers, and eventually cut their grapples. In their resistance, Antelope's crew was aided by the fact that she was higher than the Atlante, enabling the crew to fire down on the deck of the privateer while being protected. Not content with having repelled the attacks, Pascoe raced up the rigging, lashing the squaresail yard of Atlante to Antelope's foreshrouds, and continued the battle until Atlante surrendered. (Note: A number of accounts report that one of the passengers was a M. Nodin, who had served as a midshipman in the French navy. He supposedly manned the helm, and armed himself with a musket and pike. He several times quit the helm to lay about him with his pike, killing or disabling several men, returning to right Antelope. However, depositions by Mr. Pascoe and Antelope's gunner deny that M. Nodin played any such role.)

Antelope lost 3 killed and 3 wounded, one mortally. The privateer lost her first captain mortally wounded and second captain wounded, 30 men killed in the action, and 17 wounded (three mortally); only 16 of her 65 men were unhurt.

The victorious Antelope put into Annotto Bay, Jamaica with her prize. It turned out that Atlante had been out of Charlestown a month, during which time she had taken one prize, a Bermudian brig.

Jamaica's House of Assembly voted a sum of 500 guineas to the officers and men of Antelope. Two hundred guineas went to the widow of Mr. Curtis, the late master. One hundred guineas each went to the first mate, who had been shot through the body during the engagement, and to Mr. Pascoe, the boatswain. The last hundred guineas was divided among the surviving members of the crew. In London, the Committee for Encouraging the Capture of French Privateers too passed out lavish rewards. Pascoe received 50 guineas and a gold whistle; the crew, widows, and dependents received money. The Postmaster General of the United Kingdom, the Earl of Chesterfield too presented prizes but "stressed that this was an award made solely due to the lengthy defence and successful protection of the mail. He did not want to encourage crews to actively seek prize money or ships. Their duty was to the safe and swift delivery of the post."

== Fate ==
On 19 August 1794, Antelope sailed for North America with thirty men. On 19 September 1794, she encountered a squadron of French frigates in a dense fog. Her crew sank the mail and surrendered to Surveillante. While a captive of the French, Captain Kempthorne died of yellow fever. Antelope's assessed value when lost was £2750 16s 8d (plus £34 for her ordnance stores).
