= USS Antelope =

USS Antelope is a name used more than once by the U.S. Navy:

- USS Antelope (1861), a chartered stern-wheel steamer built in 1861.
- USS Antelope (IX-109), a cargo ship launched on 6 July 1943.
- USS Antelope (PGM-86), was an aluminum patrol boat launched 4 November 1967.
