= HMS Antelope (1784) =

Brig of the Royal Navy

History

Great Britain
- Name: HMS Antelope
- Acquired: April 1784
- Fate: Sunk on 30 July 1784

General characteristics
- Propulsion: Sails
- Sail plan: Brig
- Armament: 14 guns

HMS Antelope was a 14-gun brig of the Royal Navy. She was originally a mercantile brig, purchased in April 1784 at Jamaica by Vice-Admiral Gambier and commissioned that year under Lieutenant Robert Causzor. She sank in a hurricane on 30 July 1784 whilst at Jamaica.

Admiral Gambier had acquired two brigs but the Admiralty countermanded their purchase and ordered Gambier to sell them. In July the two, Antelope and Duke of Rutland, came into the King's Yard, Jamaica, to be prepared for sale. The hurricane on 30 July sank Antelope on the western wharf. The same hurricane drove Duke of Rutland ashore, breaking her back.
