= Althea (1801 ship) =

History

United Kingdom
- Name: Althea
- Namesake: Althea
- Owner: J.Gilmore & Co.,
- Port of registry: 1801:Calcutta; 1802:London
- Builder: J.Gilmore & Co., Calcutta
- Launched: 1801 (Note: Hackman gives a date of 12 February 1802. This is clearly in error as Althea sailed from Calcutta on 24 January 1802. All other sources give a year of 1801.)
- Fate: Wrecked July 1812

General characteristics
- Tons burthen: 805, or 807, or 810, or 8105/94 (bm)
- Propulsion: Sail

Althea was launched at Calcutta in 1801. She made one voyage to Britain for the British East India Company. The French captured her in the Indian Ocean in 1804 and then kept her at Île de France where she served as a prison ship. When the British captured Île de France in 1810 they recovered Althea. (However, it is probable that they recovered her in between, and lost her again.) She then resumed her mercantile career until she wrecked in 1812.

== Career ==
Captain Arundel Roberts sailed Althea from Calcutta on 24 January 1802, bound for London. She passed Saugor on 15 April and reached Saint Helena on 24 July. Althea arrived at Deptford on 15 October.

Althea was admitted to the Registry of Great Britain on 25 November 1802.

== Capture (1804) and recapture (1810) ==
On 6 April 1804 Althea, which was coming from Bengal, was near Ceylon when she parted from her convoy in a gale. On 17 April the French frigates Belle Poule and Atalante captured Althea in the Indian Ocean (7°0′S 92°30′E). Captain Miller engaged Atalante, which came up first, but when Belle Poule came up on his other side he decided to strike. One problem Miller faced was that the frigates were firing their long 18-pounder guns from a range that Althea's carronades could not reach. Althea reached Port Napoleon, Île de France, on 8 May. She and her cargo were immediately condemned in prize.

Althea had been insured for £400,000. Althea was sailing under charter to the EIC, which valued the cargo it lost at £6,698.

In a process that is currently obscure, the British appear to have recovered Althea. In March 1806, Captain William Richardson, in Althea, took on water at Pulo Timoan, and also took a number of navigational bearings. (2.779642°N 104.171722°E). On 20 July as Althea was returning to Bengal from China, she was pushed towards the Matelotas (8°15.5′N 137°44′E). In August she was at Salayer Island. In April 1807, as Althea was sailing from Bencoolen to Bengal, the Portuguese cook killed a "mussulman boy, of about five or six years of age, by running an iron instrument" up the boy's rectum. The court acquitted the cook of murder, but convicted him of manslaughter. Between August and October 1807, privateers and French naval vessels from Mauritius captured Althea, Gilwell, Elizabeth, Trafalgar, Mangles, Susanna, Caroline, Succedany, Maria, Eliza, Udny, Highland Chief, Resource, Louisa, and Mersosa. The prizes were worth about 3 million rupees. Lloyd's List reported on 16 April 1808 that the country ships Eliza, Resources, Gilwell, Loi'a, and Althea had been taken in the Bay of Bengal. On 1 November 1807 at Port Napoleon, Richardson, C. Bean, late master of Gilwell, R. Dickie, late master of Elizabeth, and some others wrote a letter to Léonard Motard, captain of Sémillante, for his kind and courteous treatment of them while they were his prisoners.

This would suggest that it was Sémillante, rather than a privateer, that captured Althea and Richardson. Althea was then laid up at Mauritius as a prison ship.

On 3 December 1810 the British captured Île de France. Among the vessels the Royal Navy found at Port Napoleon was "L'Althea, of 1000 Tons".

== Fate ==
Althea was lost upon Fultah Point, on the Hooghli River, in July 1812.
