= Upton Castle (1793 ship) =

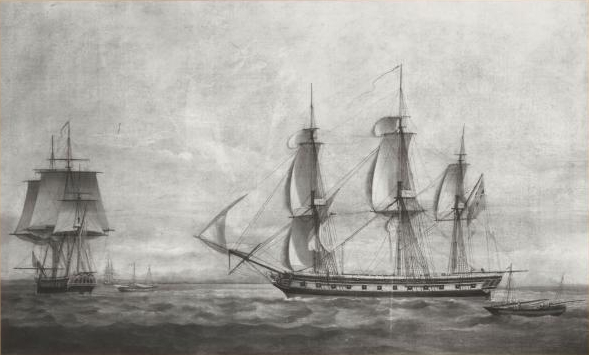
- The country ship Upton Castle in three positions, by Thomas Luny ca.1796

Great Britain
- Name: Upton Castle
- Namesake: Upton Castle
- Owner: 1793:Thomas & H.Bomanjee; 1802:Smith, Forbes, &Co. and Homanjee Bomanjee
- Builder: Bombay Dockyard
- Launched: 21 August 1793
- Fate: Burnt 1817

General characteristics
- Tons burthen: 627, or 675, or 679 27/94, or 765 (bm)
- Length: 130 ft 5 in (39.8 m)
- Beam: 35 ft 0 in (10.7 m)

Upton Castle was launched at Bombay in 1793. She spent her career as a "country ship", that is trading in the Far East. She made some voyages to England, including at least one, in 1809, under charter to the British East India Company (EIC). She also participated in two military campaigns as a transport. The French Navy captured her in 1804, but she returned to British hands before 1809. A fire in 1817 destroyed her.

== Career ==
Upton Castle was built for Pestonjee Bomanjee and John Tasker, then the Master Attendant at Bombay, and was named after Tasker's Upton Castle estate in Wales. Capt. Thomas was an early master of the vessel and later one of its co-owners, and may have been the Captain William Thomas to whom Tasker left all his "charts and sea books" in 1800. John Pavin was master of the vessel by 1799 and married Tasker's great-niece in 1801. He was again master and was taken prisoner when Upton Castle was captured by the French in 1804.

Around 1800-01, Upton Castle's history becomes a little ambiguous. One report has her in the Red Sea as one of the many transports supporting General Baird's expedition to help General Ralph Abercromby expel the French from Egypt. However, between 13 April 1800 and 10 April 1801, she had traveled from Bombay to England, having arrived at Portsmouth on 10 April. She sailed from Gravesend for India on 12 June.

In December 1801, Upton Castle sailed, together with Marquis Cornwallis, Betsey (an armed HEIC brig), some other vessels, and 1000 troops to Daman and Diu to persuade the Portuguese governor to resist any French incursion. The expedition was under the command of Captain John Mackellar, of the Royal Navy, whose own vessel, Terpsichore, was not ready for sea. The governor accepted the British reinforcements, which, as it turned out, were not needed.

In August 1804, Admiral Linois was cruising in the Indian Ocean in Marengo, together with the frigates Atalante and Sémillante. On the 18th, near the des Neoufs Channel they encountered and captured two British merchant men, Charlotte and Upton Castle. They were on their way to Bombay when Linois's squadron captured them.

Linois described Charlotte as being copper-sheathed, of 650 tons and 16 guns. She was carrying a cargo of rice. Upton Castle he described as being copper-sheathed, of 627 tons, and 14 guns. She was carrying a cargo of wheat and other products from Bengal. He sent both his prizes into Isle de France (Mauritius). She arrived at Ile de France in November, a few days prior to the 14th.

How Charlotte and Upton Castle returned to British hands is currently obscure. Still, Charlotte was again in British hands by 1807, and Upton Castle by 1809. On 23 July 1809, Master Hugh Adams sailed her from Bombay for England. She was at the Cape of Good Hope on 15 September, reached Saint Helena on 7 October, and arrived at The Downs pm 22 December.

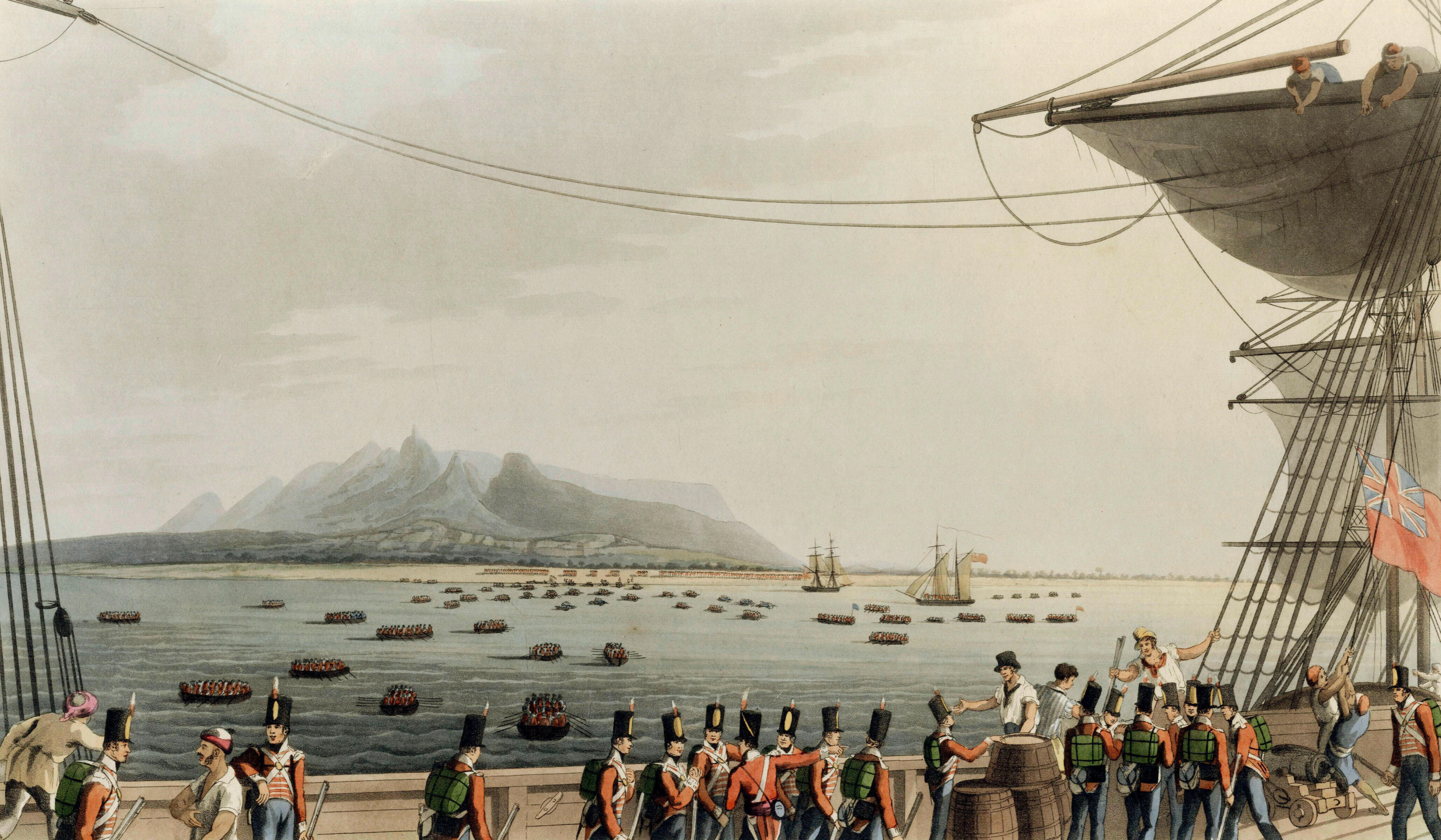
View from the Deck of the Upton Castle Transport, of the British Army Landing at Île de France; R. Temple, National Maritime Museum, Greewich

The British attacked Île de France and captured it on 3 December 1810. Upton Castle was one of almost 30 transports that delivered troops and supplies for the invasion.

The British then chartered some nine vessels, Upton Castle among them, as cartels to carry back to France the French troops that they had captured. Upton Castle arrived at Morlaix on 19 March 1812.

Between 1814 and 1817, Upton Castle's master was Henry W. Beyts. In 1816 and 1817, he sailed her to China. In 1813, the British East India Company (EIC) had lost its monopoly on the trade between India and Britain. British ships were then free to sail to India or the Indian Ocean under a licence from the EIC. Upton Castle's applied for a licence on 31 October 1814, and received it on 1 November. It is not clear that she ever took up the option to sail between London and the Far East.

== Fate ==
A fire destroyed Upton Castle on 16 February 1817, at Saugor, near the mouth of the Ganges.
