= Gilwell =

Gilwell may refer to:

- Gilwell Park, a Scouting centre near London
- Gilwell Campsite, a Scouting campsite in Hong Kong
- Gilwell Park (Victoria), a Scouting campsite near Victoria, Australia
- Camp Gilwell, a Scouting campsite near Saskatchewan, Canada
- Gilwell (1801 ship), a merchant ship

== See also ==
- Gilwell Ada's Hoeve, Scouting campsite in the Netherlands
