= Gilwell (1801 ship) =

History

United Kingdom
- Builder: Matthew Smith, Calcutta
- Launched: 27 June 1801
- Captured: 1805 & 1807

United Kingdom
- Name: Fyzal Curreem
- Renamed: Cashmere Merchant
- Fate: Last mentioned as dismasted at Mauritius prior to 13 April 1843

General characteristics
- Tons burthen: 387, 390, or 400, or 420 (bm)

Gilwell (or Gillwell) was launched in 1801 at Howrah, Calcutta as a "country ship", that is, she traded east of the Cape of Good Hope. She made one voyage for the British East India Company (EIC). In 1804 she was present but not engaged at the Battle of Pulo Aura. The French captured her in 1805 and 1807. She was renamed Fyzal Curreem and eventually Cashmere Merchant. As Cashmere Merchant she reappeared in 1827 in records of vessels registered at Calcutta. She was reported in 1842 as having been damaged in a typhoon at Calcutta. Last mentioned as dismasted at Mauritius prior to 13 April 1843.

== Career ==
Captain C.A. Sheen sailed from Calcutta on 18 June 1801, bound for London. Gilwell was at Madras on 11 September and the Cape on 24 December. She reached St Heleana on 28 January 1802, and arrived at Blackwall on 15 April. On her return to India, Gilwell carried the English painter George Chinnery as a passenger.

In 1803 Gilwell appeared on a list of vessels belonging to Madras. C.A.Sheen was still her master.

On 14 February 1804 Gilwell was present at the battle of Pulo Aura, though she did not participate in the engagement. The EIC China Fleet was returning from Canton, bound for London. A number of country ships returning to India were part of the fleet.

On 8 January 1805 the French frigate Psyché captured Gilwell as Gilwell was sailing from Bengal to Bombay. However, Psyché gave her up as Psyché did not have the crew to man Gilwell. Shortly thereafter HMS St Fiorenzo captured Psyché and carried her into Bengal. Gilwell arrived in the Ganges on 16 January.

In 1807 the French captured Gillwell in the Bay of Bengal. She was one of some 14 ships that the French captured in the Indian Ocean between August and October 1807.

On 1 November 1807 at Port Napoleon, William Richardson, late master of Althea, C. Bean, late master of Gilwell, R. Dickie, late master of Elizabeth, and some others wrote a letter to Léonard Motard, captain of Sémillante, for his kind and courteous treatment of them while they were his prisoners. This would suggest that it was Sémillante, rather than a privateer, that had captured Gilwell.

Her captors sold Gilwell to Arabs at Jiddah, who renamed her Fyzal Curreem.

She later became a rebuilt razee under the name Cashmere Merchant.

The 1819 and 1824 volumes of the East-India directory made no mention in list of vessels belonging to Calcutta, Madras, or Bombay under any name.

The 1827 volume of the East India directory showed Cashmere Merchant as belonging to Calcutta. Her master was Thomas Woodley, and her managing owner was Shaik Abdullah. The 1829 volume did not report the names of her master or managing owner, but it did describe her as being built at Howrah.

In the 1830s Cashmere Merchant was reported trading from Calcutta with China, Burma, Mauritius, and Singapore.

== Fate ==
Cashmere Merchant was damaged on 3 June 1842 in a typhoon at Calcutta. She was at Mauritius prior to 13 April 1843, dismasted. There are no later mentions of her.
