= Sarah (1792 ship) =

History

Great Britain
- Name: Sarah
- Owner: Smith, Forbes & Co. (1800–1805)
- Launched: 1782
- Fate: Deliberately wrecked 11 July 1805

General characteristics
- Tons burthen: 850, or 935, or 9354/94 (bm)
- Propulsion: Sail
- Complement: 126
- Armament: 1800:18 × 9&6-pounder guns; 1801:20 × 12-pounder guns

Sarah was launched at Bombay in 1792. In 1801 she participated as a transport in the British expedition to the Red Sea. Her captain deliberately ran her ashore in 1805 to prevent the French from capturing her.

== Career ==
Sarah's first owner may have been a Mr. Morley. She then disappears from on-line sources until 1800. Sarah was admitted to the Registry of Great Britain on 24 April 1800. On 1 May Captain Charles Christopher McIntosh acquired a letter of marque.

From 1801 her owners were Smith, Forbes & Co. In 1801 they asked for twenty 12-pounders from the frigate Bombay with which to arm Sarah. Her master was Captain C.C. M'Intosh.

In 1801 she was one of the transports Major-General Sir David Baird's expedition in 1801 to the Red Sea. Baird was in command of the Indian army that was going to Egypt to help General Ralph Abercromby expel the French there. Baird landed at Kosseir, on the Egyptian side of the Red Sea. He then led his troops army across the desert to Kena on the Nile, and then to Cairo. He arrived before Alexandria in time for the final operations.

== Loss ==
The East Indiaman Brunswick, Sarah, and two more country ships sailed from Colombo on 1 July 1805, bound for China. On 4 July the two country ships separated and Brunswick and Sarah proceeded in company. On 11 July they were off Point de Galle when they encountered Contre-Admiral Charles-Alexandre Durand Linois in his flagship Marengo, accompanied by the frigate Belle Poule, who were cruising to raid British commerce. Marengo quickly captured Brunswick and Belle Poule set out to capture Sarah, which was further to windward.

M'Intosh ran Sarah, under full sail, into the breakers north of Point de Galle. Shortly thereafter she hoisted a distress signal, which led Belle Poule to report that she was totally lost. However, her crew had scrambled ashore. In a letter to the Admiralty dated 22 July 1805, Admiral Edward Pellew wrote that "the Cargo will be saved, and there are hopes of getting the ship off." A listing of prizes taken by Linois's squadron in the Indies describes Sarah as an Indiaman of 1,100 tons (bm), with a cargo of cotton and sandalwood. It gave the value of her loss as 180,000 piastres.
