= Charlotte (1803 ship) =

UK merchant ship (1803–1851)

History

United Kingdom
- Name: Charlotte
- Owner: 1804-7:Alex Adamson; 1808-1829:Forbes & Co.; 1831-32:Jamsetjee Jeejeebhoy; 1833:Madowas Dhurumdass
- Builder: Bombay Dockyard
- Launched: 1803
- Fate: Wrecked 1851

General characteristics
- Tons burthen: 650, or 672, or 707, or 70781/94, or 7078/94 (bm)
- Length: 135 ft 9 in (41.4 m)
- Beam: 34 ft 2 in (10.4 m)
- Propulsion: Sail

Charlotte was built at the Bombay Dockyard in 1803. She spent most of her career as a country ship, trading between India and China, though she did sail between India and the United Kingdom on occasion, and under a licence from the British East India Company (EIC). The French captured her in 1804, but she returned to British hands. She was wrecked in 1851.

== Career ==
Charlotte sailed between India and China in 1803, 1807, 1808, 1811, 1816, 1818, 1819, 1920, 1821, 1822, and 1826. On 14 February 1804, Charlotte was one of the 28 vessels that made up the China Fleet, sailing back from China. Sixteen of the vessels were East Indiamen of the British East India Company (EIC). Eleven vessels (including Charlotte), were country ships. The EIC also had an armed brig. At the Battle of Pulo Aura the Fleet, under the leadership of Commodore Nathaniel Dance, managed to bluff a French squadron of a 74-gun third rate, two frigates, and two corvettes, into withdrawing after an exchange of long-distance fire.

In August 1804, Admiral Linois was cruising in the Indian Ocean in Marengo, together with the frigates Atalante and Sémillante. On the 18th, near Desnoeufs Island, they encountered and captured two British merchant men, Charlotte and Upton Castle. They were on their way to Bombay when Linois's squadron captured them.

Linois described Charlotte as being copper-sheathed, of 650 tons and 16 guns. She was carrying a cargo of rice. Upton Castle he described as being copper-sheathed, of 627 tons, and 14 guns. She was carrying a cargo of wheat and other products from Bengal. He sent both his prizes into Isle de France (Mauritius).

How Charlotte and Upton Castle returned to British hands is currently obscure. Still, Charlotte was again in British hands by 1807, and Upton Castle by 1809.

In 1808 Captain Purefoy, of Charlotte observed a reef that was later determined to be at 21°35′N 121°50′E, about 100 miles ESE of the southernmost point on Taiwan.

In 1813, the EIC had lost its monopoly on the trade between India and Britain. British ships were then free to sail to India or the Indian Ocean under a licence from the EIC. Charlotte's owners or agents applied for such a licence, which they received the next day.

Charlotte is twice listed among country ships sailing from London to Bombay. Under the command of Captain Brown, she sailed on 17 May 1815, and apparently again on 15 November.

In 1815, Charlotte carried 15 Indian convicts from Bengal to Mauritius.

After 1816, in between voyages to China, Charlotte frequently sailed to Batavia.

On occasion she transported troops. In 1820, she carried part of the 65th Regiment of Foot to Mandvi. However, it took her three days to clear the Gulf of Kutch as she tried to return to Bombay. On 25 February 1825, as Charlotte returned from London she stopped at Cannanore where she picked up troops from the 20th Regiment of Foot. She carried them to Panwell, from where they could march to Poona.

In between these two tasks, Charlotte twice sailed to the Elbe. The first voyage was in 1823. Within a year she sailed again and arrived there on 12 August 1824. She was too large to arrive at Hamburg. On one voyage she brought back a cargo valued at Rs 225,327. It consisted of iron and steel, canvas, cordage, masts and spars, spelter, and turpentine. On her return she paid the EIC 3.5% of the prime cost. She also paid 4% Town Duty on piece goods.

=== Masters (1803–1833) ===
- Ruddock (1803–06)
- Purefoy, James (1807 & 8)
- Brown, Peter (1811–17)
- Stevenson, C. James (1818–1825)
- Hector, T. (1826–29)
- Melville, George (1831–33)

== Fate ==
On 1 June 1851, Charlotte sailed from Calcutta and by 11 June, she was some 30 miles south of Bombay. The weather worsened and the captain set out anchors. However, Charlotte parted from her anchors and was driven ashore. The next morning the mate and 12 hands tried to reach shore in the ship's cutter. The cutter swamped in the surf, drowning one European apprentice and a native seaman. The remainder reached shore and were able to send a message to Bombay. Near noon Charlotte's master and the remaining crew left her on a raft they had constructed. Five minutes after they left their ship she broke apart. Fortunately, the men on the raft were able to reach the shore. All the survivors then proceeded on foot to Colaba. There the British East India Company's agent facilitated their reaching Bombay.

Charlotte was carrying rice worth about Rs 60,000, and she was worth about the same. Ship and cargo were insured, but not to their full value. The captain's loss was particularly heavy as he was part owner of ship and cargo.
