= Upton Castle (ship) =

Several vessels have borne the name Upton Castle for Upton Castle:

- Upton Castle (1793 ship) was a country ship launched at Bombay. The French captured her in 1804 but she returned to British hands and performed one voyage under charter to the East India Company. She was burnt in 1817.
- Upton Castle (1818 ship) was a merchant ship launched at Cochin that was lost in 1839 while sailing from the Cape of Good Hope to Bombay.
- Upton Castle (1896 trawler) was a fishing trawler launched at South Shields; SM UC-29 captured and scuttled her on 24 April 1917.
