= French frigate Atalante (1802) =

Frigate of the French Navy

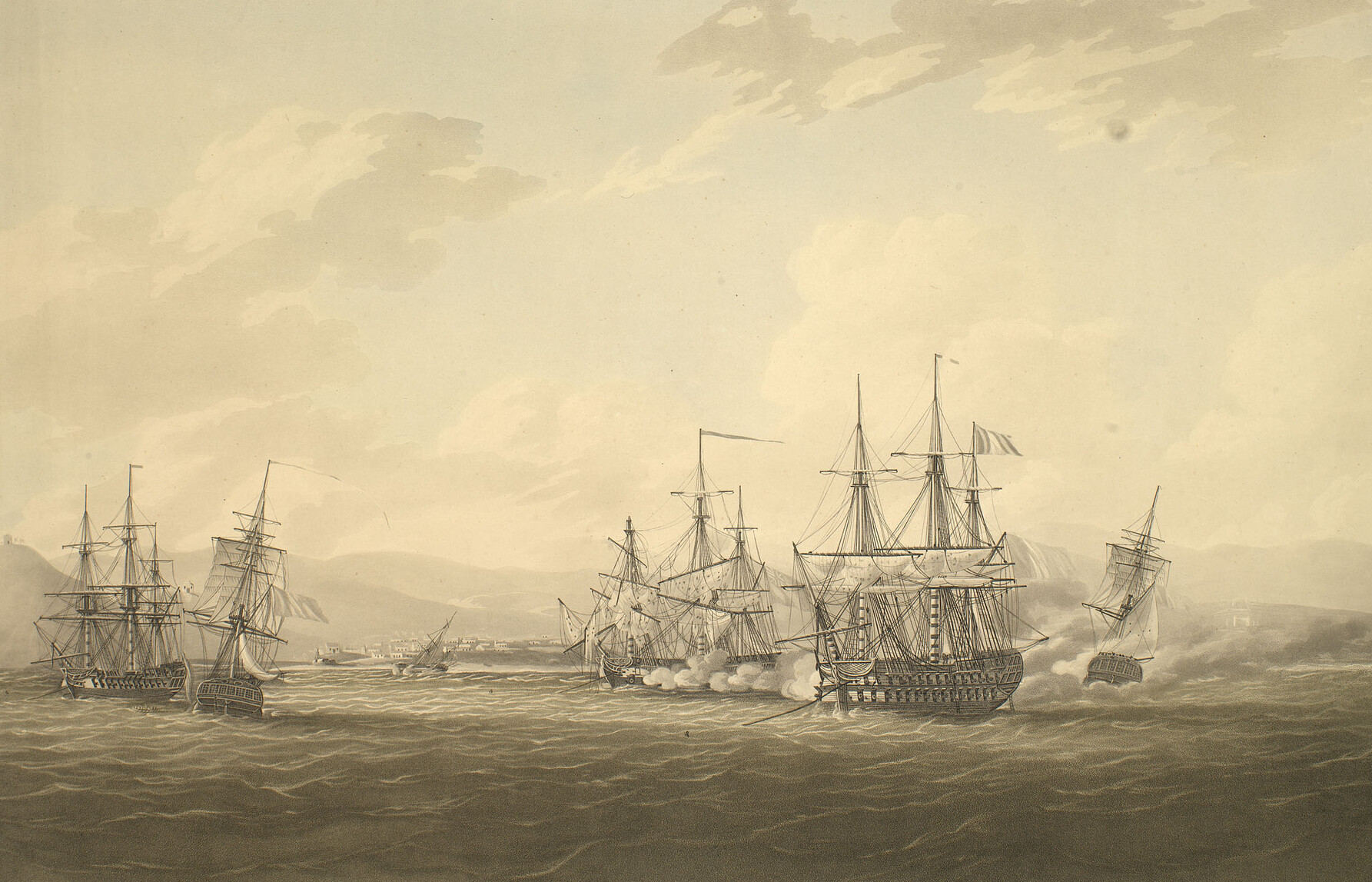
- Atalante at the Battle of Visakhapatnam

History

France
- Name: Atalante
- Builder: Enterprise Ethéart, Saint-Malo (Constructeur: François Pestel)
- Laid down: September 1797
- Launched: 29 June 1802
- Commissioned: 1 July 1802
- Fate: Wrecked 3 November 1805 or 10 January 1806 (see text)

General characteristics
- Class & type: Virginie-class frigate
- Displacement: 1,390 tonneaux
- Tons burthen: 720 port tonneaux
- Length: 47.75 m (156 ft 8 in)
- Beam: 12.18 m (40 ft 0 in)
- Draught: 5.85 m (19 ft 2 in) (laden)
- Complement: 330-340
- Armament: Carried 44 cannons in British service(including carronades); Upper deck: 28 × 18-pounder guns; Foc'sle and quarterdeck: 14 × 32-pounder carronades + 2 × 9-pounder guns

Atalante was a 40-gun Virginie-class frigate of the French Navy. Launched in 1802, she began cruising in the Indian Ocean in 1803 under Frigate Captain Carmille-Charles-Alexis Gaudin Beauchene in a squadron led by Counter-admiral Charles-Alexandre Léon Durand Linois, whose mission was to attack British commercial targets. Linois' squadron consisted of the 74-gun ship of the line Marengo and the frigates Atalante, Belle Poule and Sémillante along with troopships and supply vessels.

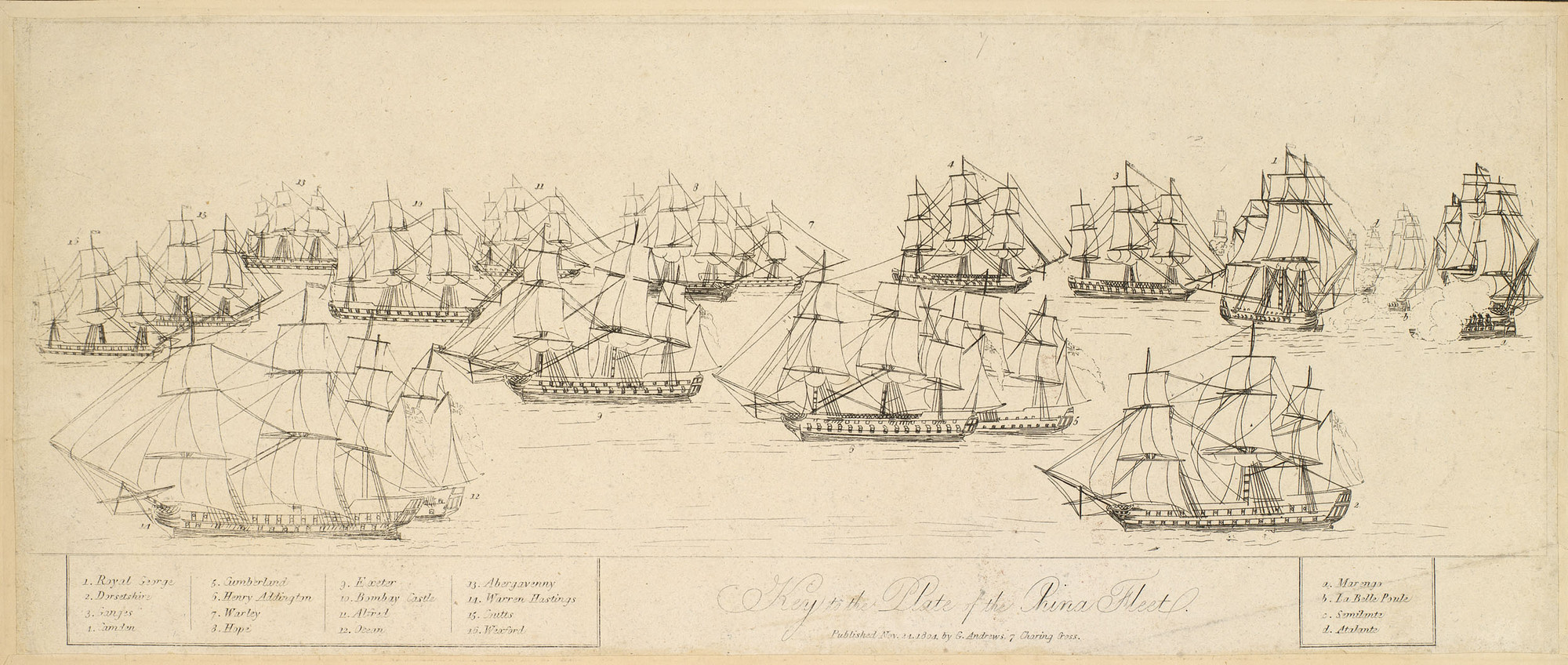
Atalante can be seen in this printed key for a view of the Battle of Pulau Aur, a painting by Francis Sartorius, the younger after a drawing by an officer on board the Henry Addington

At early November 1803, Atalante set sail with the rest of the squadron for Batavia to protect the Dutch East Indies. En route, she participated in an attack on British Bencoolen in December which resulted in the destruction of an East India Company (EIC) trading post and the capture of five ships. Linois' squadron subsequently sailed for the South China Sea, where the EIC's annual China Fleet was expected. During the operation Linois sent Atalante to Muscat. The rest of the squadron encountered the China Fleet on 15 February 1804 in the Battle of Pulo Aura, where aggressive manoeuvres by EIC merchantmen fooled Linois into thinking that he had encountered Royal Navy warships, leading the French to retreat to Batavia.

In August 1804, Linois was cruising in the Indian Ocean in Marengo, together with Atalante and Sémillante. On 18 August, near Desnoeufs Island they encountered and captured the British merchantmen Charlotte and Upton Castle. Both ships had been en route to Bombay when Linois's squadron captured them. Linois described Charlotte as being copper-sheathed, of 650 tons and 16 guns. She was carrying a cargo of rice. Upton Castle he described as being copper-sheathed, of 627 tons, and 14 guns. She was carrying a cargo of wheat and other products from Bengal. He sent both his prizes into Isle de France.

Linois next dispatched Atalante and Belle Poule to the Gulf of Bengal, where they captured several ships before returning to Isle de France. Among their captures were Althea in April 1804, and Athias and Heroism. Atalante also fought in the Battle of Visakhapatnam on 18 September 1804. On 3 November 1805, she was moored in the Dutch Cape Colony near the shoreline when a gust of wind washed her ashore, though by 7 November Atalante had been refloated and repaired. Accounts of her subsequent fate differ: one account has it that she was found irreparable and was written off as a total loss. However, British Commodore Sir Home Popham reported that the "French Ship Atalante, of 40 Guns, and Batavian Ship Bato, of 68 Guns: Destroyed by the Enemy running them on Shore when the Cape was attacked, January 10, 1806."

== See also ==
- Shipwrecks of Cape Town
