= Olive (1802 ship) =

British/French naval vessel

History

United Kingdom
- Name: Olive
- Builder: J. Gilmour & Co., Calcutta
- Launched: 5 May 1802
- Fate: Captured June 1806

France
- Name: Olive
- Acquired: 1806 by capture
- Decommissioned: March 1807

General characteristics
- Displacement: 600 tons (unladen) or 900 (laden) (Note: The source of this data is probably conflating the current Olive with another vessel, possibly of Spanish origin.)
- Tons burthen: 400, or 420 (bm)

Olive was launched at Calcutta in 1802. The French captured her in 1806 and the French Navy took her into service under her existing name. She was decommissioned in March 1807.

== Career ==
J. Gilmour & Co. launched Olive at Calcutta on 5 May 1802. In 1803 her master was H. Matthew.

The French frigate Sémillante captured Olive on 19 June 1806. Olive was only one of several ships that Sémillante captured on her cruise.

Olive was commissioned on 6 December 1806 at Île de France as a flute. Later, Olive was reported to have been there on 10 January 1807, and to have been captured in the Red Sea. She was decommissioned in March 1807.

Olive apparently returned to British hands and reappeared as a transport at the British invasion of Java (1811).

She then disappeared again from readily available sources.
