= French frigate Sémillante (1791) =

French Navy ship

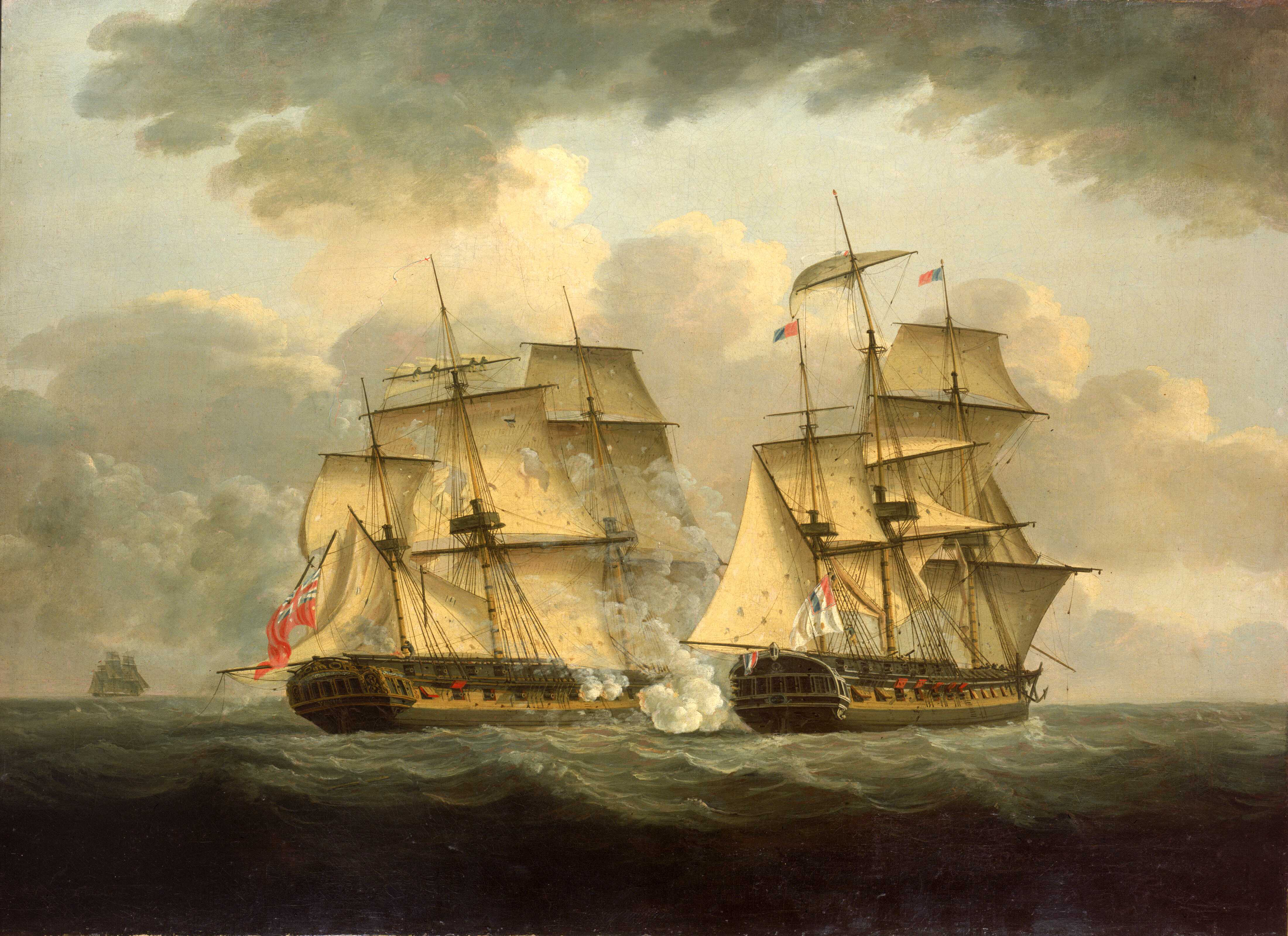
- Sémillante (right) at the action of 27 May 1793

History

France
- Name: Sémillante
- Builder: Lorient
- Laid down: December 1790
- Launched: 25 November 1791
- In service: May 1792
- Fate: Sold in 1808, renamed Charles; Captured and broken up

General characteristics
- Class & type: Sémillante-class frigate
- Tons burthen: 600 port tonneaux
- Length: 45.5 m (149 ft)
- Beam: 11.5 m (38 ft)
- Draught: 5.5 m (18 ft)
- Sail plan: Full-rigged ship
- Armament: 26 × 12-pounder long guns + 6 × 6-pounder guns

Sémillante (French: "Shiny" or "Sparkling") was a 32-gun frigate of the French Navy and the lead ship of her class. She was involved in a number of multi-vessel actions against the Royal Navy, particularly in the Indian Ocean. She captured a number of East Indiamen before she became so damaged that the French disarmed her and turned her into a merchant vessel. The British captured her and broke her up in 1809.

== French Revolutionary Wars ==
Between 1 July and 21 November 1792, Sémillante was under the command of Commandant chevalier de Bruix, lieutenant de vaisseau. She escorted a convoy and carried troops from Lorient to Saint-Domingue. She returned to Lorient from Port-au-Prince with some government officials. de Bruix, was promoted to the rank of capitaine de vaisseau and remained captain until 14 May 1793, with Sémillante escorting convoys between Bordeaux and Brest.

Lieutenant de vaisseaux Gaillard replaced de Bruix. On 21 May 1793, Sémillante captured the Liverpool privateer Active. She was under the command of Captain Stephen Bower, and was sailing under a letter of marque dated 2 May 1793. The letter of marque described her as a sloop of 100 tons burthen (bm), armed with twelve 4-pounder guns and four swivel guns, and having a crew of 40 men. The British later recaptured Active and sent her into Guernsey. (Note: This may have been Actif, which the Royal Navy took into service as HMS Actif.) The next day, Sémillante captured the Guernsey privateer Betsey, of 10 guns and 55 men. (Note: This may have been Betsey, of 160 tons (bm), twelve 4-pounder guns and six swivel guns, under the command of Peter DePutron, and sailing under a letter of marque dated 17 April 1793. In any case, the French took her into service in July as Betzy, and she proceeded to serve as a convoy escort between Brest and Lorient. Amazon captured her off Ushant on 12 June 1796. The Royal Navy did not take her into service.)

On 27 May 1793, Sémillante encountered the British frigate Venus. In the ensuing combat, which lasted some two hours, Sémillante lost 20 men killed and 40 wounded, Gaillard being among the dead. When Venus lost her main top mast, Sémillante was able to extricate herself and escape to Brest, where she arrived on 2 June.

Enseigne de vaisseau non entretenu Garreau replaced Gaillard. Later, Capitaine de vaisseau Lemancq took command. In June–July 1794, Lemancq sailed to the United States, returning with a convoy and passengers from the Chesapeake to Brest.

In May–June 1795, Sémillante was under the command of lieutenant de vaisseau Bertrand (aîné). He sailed her to New York, returning to Lorient. He later received promotion to capitaine de vaisseau, and sailed Sémillante on a cruise in the Atlantic in May 1796, before returning to Lorient. The next year, he carried passengers from Port Francais in Sainte-Domingue to Guadeloupe and then to Lorient.

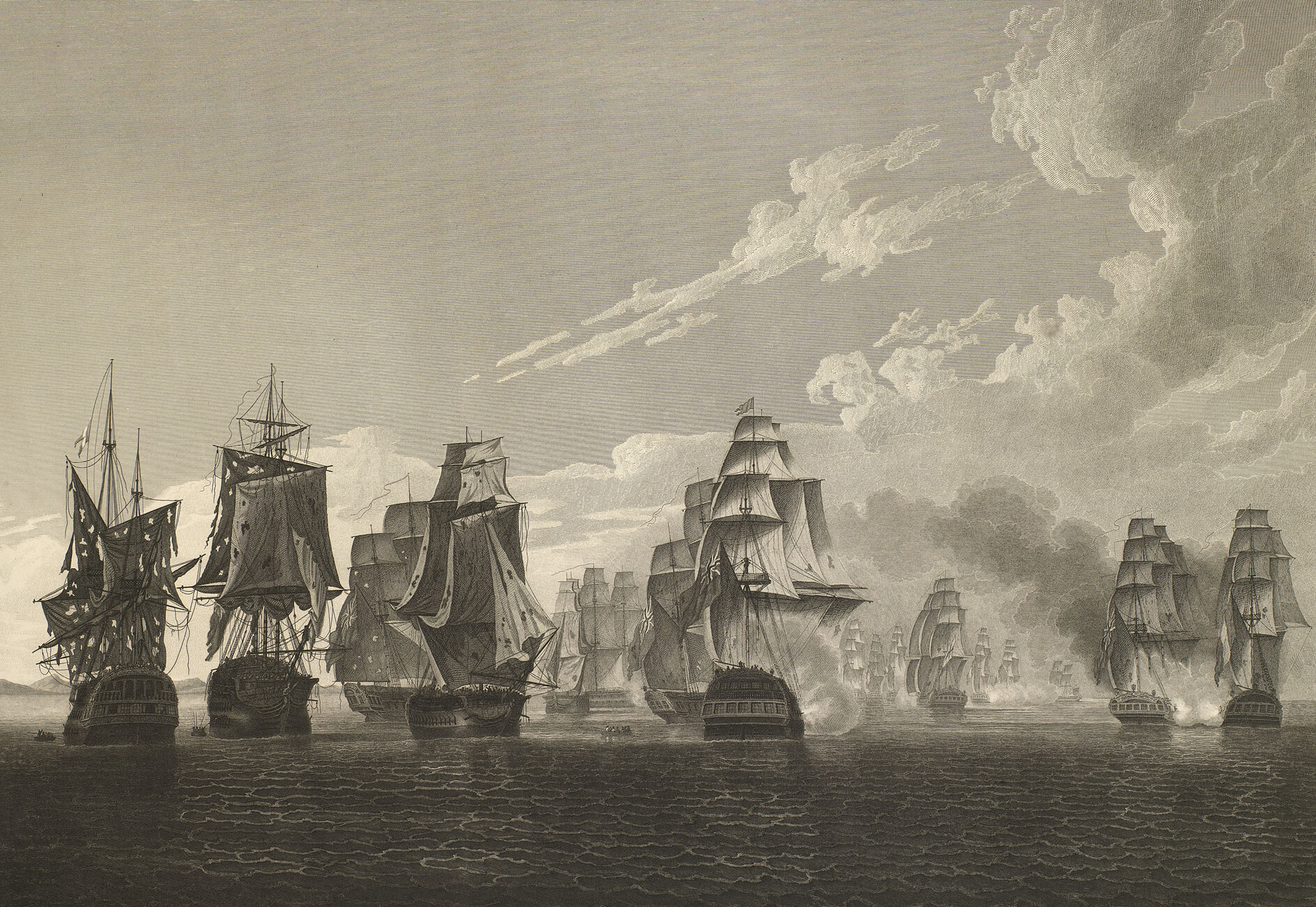
Sémillante at the Battle of Tory Island

In 1798, Sémillante took part in the Expédition d'Irlande, and notably the Battle of Tory Island. At the time she was under the command of capitaine de frégate Lacoutre.

On 9 April 1799, Sémillante, under the command of capitaine de frégate Montalan, along with Vengeance and Cornélie, encountered and fought HMS St Fiorenzo and HMS Amelia off Belle Île. The engagement was indecisive, with the French ships escaping up the Loire. The British suffered three men killed and 35 wounded.

In November–December 1800, Montalan was still captain of Sémillante when she carried Citizen Pichon, France's commissionaire general for commercial relations, to the United States. In January 1801 Sémillante sailed back to Lorient.

== Napoleonic Wars ==
Between 15 May 1803 and 17 December, capitaine de frégate (later capitaine de vaisseau) Léonard Motard sailed Sémillante to the East Indies. There she destroyed English factories on Sumatra and near the roads of Batavia.

In 1804, Sémillante was based at Île de France to engage in commerce raiding.

Sémillante and the frigate Atalante were sailing in a squadron under the command of Contre-Admiral Charles-Alexandre Durand Linois with the 74-gun third rate ship of the line Marengo.

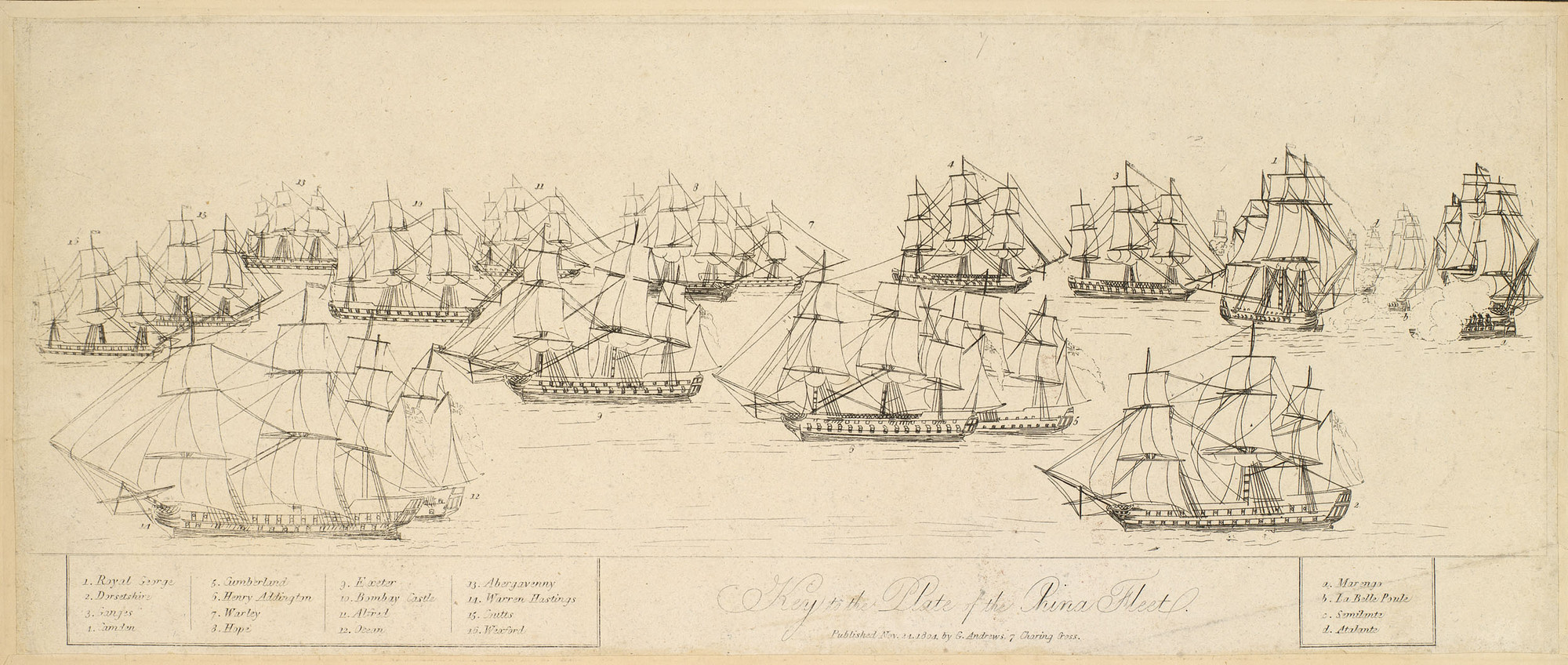
Sémillante can be seen in this printed key for a view of the Battle of Pulau Aur, a painting by Francis Sartorius, the younger after a drawing by an officer on board the Henry Addington

Sémillante was in Linois' squadron at the Battle of Pulo Aura on 15 February 1804. Linois attacked the British East India Company's China Fleet, a large convoy of well-armed merchant ships carrying cargo worth £8 million. Although the entire British fleet consisted of merchantmen, escorted by the East India Company's tiny gun-brig Ganges, Linois failed to press the attack. Instead, he withdrew with the convoy at his mercy, invoking the anger of Napoleon when the news reached France.

In August Linois was cruising in the Indian Ocean in Marengo, together with Atalante and Sémillante. On the 18th, near Desnoeufs Island they encountered and captured two British merchant men, Charlotte and Upton Castle. They had been on their way to Bombay when Linois's squadron captured them.

Linois described Charlotte as being copper-sheathed, of 650 tons and 16 guns. She was carrying a cargo of rice. Upton Castle he described as being copper-sheathed, of 627 tons, and 14 guns. She was carrying a cargo of wheat and other products from Bengal. He sent both his prizes into Isle de France (Mauritius).

On 15 September, under Motard, together with Marengo and Atalanta, Sémillante participated in the Battle of Vizagapatam. During the battle the three French ships engaged the sole British warship, the 50-gun HMS Centurion. Sémillante also captured the East Indiaman Princess Charlotte. The French squadron caused a second East Indiaman, Barnaby, to panic and run aground. Despite his overwhelming superiority in firepower, Linois once again withdrew his squadron, leaving Centurion to survive.

On 3 December, along with Berceau, Sémillante destroyed and captured seven British merchantmen off Paolo Bay. On 15 May 1806, she recaptured the French privateer Île de France, taken by HMS Duncan circa April 1804, and scuttled Île de France as she was "of low value and a poor sailor".

On 8 June 1806, Sémillante captured the country ships Acteon, Olive, and Active. Later she also captured the country ships James Drummond and Fame. Members of her crew recaptured Fame. Sémillante put a prize crew on Fame but also left her fourth officer and many lascars on board. These overpowered the prize crew and took Fame into Bombay.

On 11 November, she encountered HMS Sceptre and HMS Cornwallis; an engagement developed on 13 November that resulted in the British ships withdrawing.

On 22 August 1807 Experiment, Cripps, master, was sailing from Rangoon to Calcutta when she encountered Sémillante, which captured Experiment, took off her officers, and put on a prize crew of four or five men with orders to sail to Île de France. The lascars overpowered the prize crew on 22 October, and forced the French to sail Experiment to Ganjam, where she arrived on 4 November. In the meantime, Sémillante had landed on the coast of India a number of captains and officers of vessels she had captured, and these men had made their way back to Calcutta.

Between 15 March and 18 March 1808, Sémillante fought a running battle with HMS Terpsichore, and escaped to Île de France. Terpsichore suffered 21 men killed and 20 wounded. Sémillante was so seriously damaged that the French removed her armament and decommissioned her on 10 July. However, the principal damage to Sémillante apparently was due to an explosion in a room near the magazine during the action. To reduce risk, the crew flooded the magazine, leaving her without usable powder, Sémillante had no choice but to break off the action with Terpsichore and return to port. Sémillante reportedly had five men killed and six wounded, including Motard, who may have had to have his arm amputated. It is not clear from the report how many casualties were due to the action and how many to the explosion.

== Charles ==
In September Robert Surcouf purchased Sémillante, after his own ship, the Revenant, had been requisitioned for the defence of the island. He renamed Sémillante Charles after his late brother and sailed her to Saint Malo, laden with the spoils of his campaign. (By some accounts he brought with him almost 8 million French francs.) He arrived in February 1809, and did not go to sea again, though he did arm and fit out privateers.

On 5 February 1809, the day after she arrived, Charles sank in Saint-Servan harbour; she was later raised and rebuilt. In 1810 she was recommissioned in Saint-Malo with 22 guns and a crew of 195 men, under the command of Pierre Alexandre Marrauld.

On 15 October 1810 the privateer Charles, of 20 guns and 200 men, captured the Howe, Pentrick, master. Howe had sailed for Penzance from Quebec in a convoy of 25 vessels under escort by Grasshopper, but had separated from the convoy five days earlier. Charles detained Howe for some six hours, took a few things, but then permitted Howe to proceed. Howe arrived at Penzance on 19 October.

On 16 October, a French privateer brig detained the Hope, Craig, master, as Hope was sailing from New Brunswick to Plymouth. The privateer took all the sails, rigging, stores, etc. from Hope. On the next day the privateer Charles came upon Hope and offered her anything she might need. A gale on 22 October cost Hope the rigging, sails, and the like that Charles had provided, as well as her bowsprit, foremast, and maintopmast. Hope nevertheless arrived safely at the Scilly Islands on the 28th.

On 26 October, Charles captured the Americana, Fousica, master, which was sailing from Bahia to London. HMS Dryad recaptured Americana on 31 October; Americana then arrived at Plymouth on 9 November. (Note: Lloyd's Register describes Americana as teak-built, of 283 tons, and from the Brazils. It gave her trade as London-Brazil.)

== Fate ==
On 8 November 1810 about 400 miles (640 km) west of Finisterre (44°41′N 21°24′W). Charles encountered the British frigate HMS Amelia. A 13-hour running chase ensued, with speeds reaching as much as 12½ knots, before Charles struck. Amelia then sent her into Plymouth. Too old and damaged to be brought into British service, she was broken up.
