= French ship Nestor (1793) =

Ship of the line of the French Navy

- Scale model of Achille, sister ship of French ship Nestor (1793), on display at the Musée national de la Marine in Paris.

History

France
- Name: Nestor
- Namesake: Nestor
- Laid down: 1793
- Launched: 22 July 1793
- Renamed: Cisalpin in 1797; Aquilon 1803
- Fate: Captured and burned 12 April 1809

General characteristics
- Class & type: Téméraire-class ship of the line
- Displacement: 3,069 tonneaux
- Tons burthen: 1,537 port tonneaux
- Length: 55.87 metres (183.3 ft) (172 pied)
- Beam: 14.90 metres (48 ft 11 in)
- Draught: 7.26 metres (23.8 ft) (22 pied)
- Propulsion: Up to 2,485 m^{2} (26,750 sq ft) of sails
- Armament: 74 guns: Lower gundeck: 28 × 36-pounder long guns; Upper gundeck: 30 × 18-pounder long guns; Forecastle and Quarter deck: 16 × 8-pounder long guns; 4 × 36-pounder carronades
- Armour: Timber

Nestor was a 74-gun Téméraire-class ship of the line built for the French Navy during the 1790s.

In the night of 30 December 1794, Nestor was dismasted due to the poor quality of her masts, and had to return to Brest for repairs. On her journey back, the Nestor met a British frigate flying a French flag. The British officers closed in, addressed their French counterparts in perfect French, and were told the position of the French fleet.

In December 1796 Nestor took part in the Expédition d'Irlande as flagship of Linois' squadron of three ships of the line and four frigates. After reaching Bantry Bay but deciding not to land troops on the advice of embarked French Army generals, the squadron headed back to Brest, taking three prizes on the way and sailing through the British blockade by night.

Nestor was renamed Cisaplin in 1797 and Aquilon in 1803. By 1809, she was part of the French Atlantic Fleet.

In April 1809, the French Atlantic Fleet was blockaded by the Royal Navy in Basque Roads at the mouth of the Charente on the Biscay coast of France. On 12 April, during the Battle of Basque Roads, Aquilon was aground on rocks at low tide in Basque Roads near Charenton when British Royal Navy warships attacked. During the afternoon, the British brig-sloop HMS Beagle took up a position across her bows and raked her with heavy carronades. After two hours of pounding by the British fleet with little chance to fire back, Aquilon surrendered. Although the leader of the British attack, Lord Thomas Cochrane, disapproved of the decision, the commanding officer of the third rate ship of the line HMS Valiant, Captain John Bligh, deemed Aquilon beyond repair and set her afire during the night of 12–13 April 1809. The fire completed the destruction of Aquilon′s wreck.

== See also ==
- List of ships of the line of France

== Bibliography ==
- Winfield, Rif and Roberts, Stephen S. (2015) French Warships in the Age of Sail 1786-1861: Design, Construction, Careers and Fates. Seaforth Publishing. ISBN 978-1-84832-204-2
