= Dutch ship Staaten Generaal =

Ship of the line of the Dutch States Navy

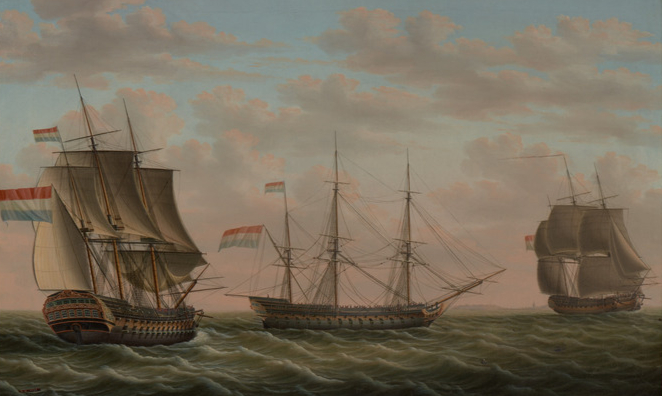
- 1795 painting of Staaten Generaal in three positions

History

Dutch Republic
- Name: Staaten Generaal
- Launched: 1786
- Commissioned: 1786

Batavian Republic
- Name: Staaten Generaal
- Renamed: Bato in 1798
- Fate: Burned and scuttled 10 January 1806

General characteristics
- Class & type: 74-gun ship of the line
- Sail plan: Full-rigged ship
- Armament: 74 guns

Staaten Generaal was a 74-gun ship of the line of the Dutch States Navy. The order to construct the ship was given by the Admiralty of the Meuse. The ship was commissioned in 1786. In April 1788 the ship was crewed with 550 men. It measured 180'0'' Amsterdam feet long, had a breadth of 48'6'' Amsterdam feet and had a depth of 22'0'' Amsterdam feet. In 1795, the ship was commissioned in the Batavian Navy.

On 11 October 1797 the Staaten Generaal took part in the Battle of Camperdown as the flagship of Schout-bij-nacht Samuel Story. The ship was engaged by HMS Venerable, Admiral Adam Duncan's flagship, and caught fire twice. The fire was extinguished both times, but the Staaten Generaal drifted away from the battle and was unable to continue the fight in a favourable position. On the morning of 12 October she escaped to Texel with the remainder of the Batavian fleet. In 1798, the ship was renamed Bato.

She sailed to the Dutch Cape Colony in 1802, after which she sailed on to Batavia. Upon her return to the Cape, she underwent inspection and was found to be in poor condition, and was turned into a hulked gun platform. She was anchored in Simon's Bay to guard approaches to the naval base. During the Battle of Blaauwberg, Bato was scuttled by burning to prevent her capture. British Commodore Sir Home Popham, in a letter published in the London Gazette, reported that the "French Ship Atalante, of 40 Guns, and Batavian Ship Bato, of 68 Guns: Destroyed by the Enemy running them on Shore when the Cape was attacked, January 10, 1806." The wreck of Bato was recently discovered.

== See also ==
- Shipwrecks of Cape Town
