= Charles-Alexandre Léon Durand Linois =

French Navy officer and colonial administrator (1761–1848)

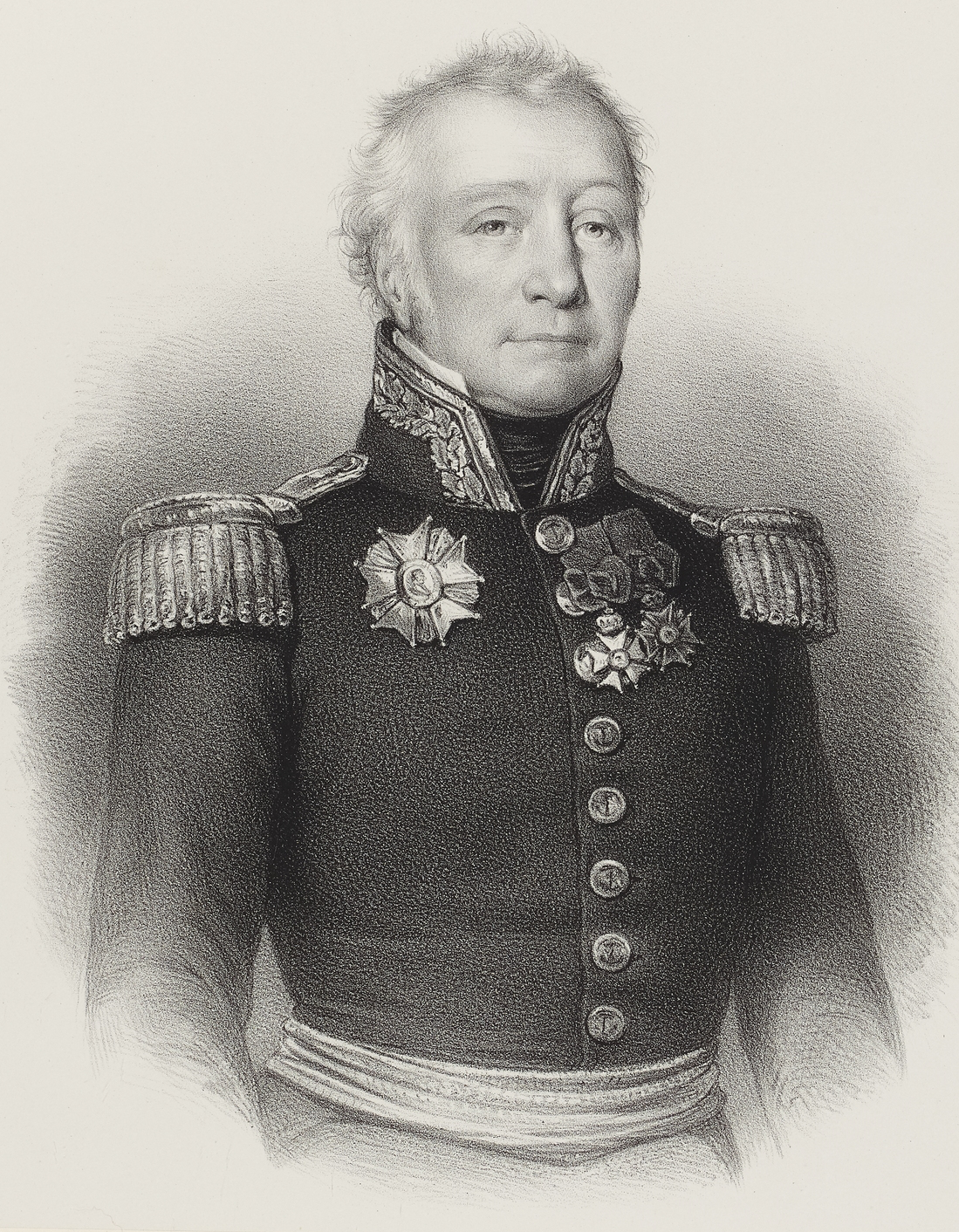
- Portrait by Antoine Maurin, 1837
- Born: 27 January 1761; Brest, France
- Died: 2 December 1848 (aged 87); Versailles, France
- Military career
- Allegiance: Kingdom of France; French First Republic; First French Empire
- Branch: French Navy; French Imperial Navy
- Rank: Counter admiral
- Conflicts: French Revolutionary Wars; Action of 7 May 1794; Battle of Groix; French expedition to Ireland (1796); Algeciras campaign; First Battle of Algeciras; Second Battle of Algeciras; Napoleonic Wars; Linois's expedition to the Indian Ocean; Battle of Pulo Aura; Battle of Visakhapatnam; Action of 13 March 1806 (surrendered); Invasion of Guadeloupe (1815) (surrendered)

Counter-Admiral Charles-Alexandre Léon Durand, comte de Linois (27 January 1761 – 2 December 1848) was a French Navy officer and colonial administrator who served in the American Revolutionary War and French Revolutionary and Napoleonic Wars. He commanded the combined Franco-Spanish fleet during the Algeciras campaign in 1801, winning the campaign's first battle but losing its second battle after Juan Joaquín Moreno de Mondragón took command.

In March 1803, Linois set out on an ultimately unsuccessful campaign against British trade in the Indian Ocean and South China Sea, fighting in the Battle of Pulo Aura in 1804, where a commercial East India Company fleet defeated him using aggressive and deceptive tactics. Linois continued his campaign until being captured by the British at the action of 13 March 1806; an infuriated Napoleon refused to exchange him, and Linois was not released until 1814.

Following the Bourbon Restoration in France, Linois was appointed governor of Guadeloupe, and supported Napoleon during the Hundred Days. This led to an Anglo-Bourbon expeditionary force capturing Guadeloupe in 1815 and deposing Linois. Upon his return to France, he was forced to resign and court martialled. Although acquitted, Linois never held an office again until his death in 1848.

== Early life ==
Born in Brest, Linois joined the French Navy as a volunteer in 1776, when he was 15 years old, serving aboard the ships Cesar and Protée in his home port. In August 1778, during the American War of Independence, he joined Bien-Aimé , part of d'Orvilliers' fleet in the Caribbean where, after only eight months service, he was temporarily appointed, lieutenant de frégate pour le campagne. He served aboard the newly built Scipion from May 1779 to January 1781, when his two-year probationary period expired and he was promoted to ship-of-the-line ensign. Between October 1782 and April 1783, Linois served aboard Diadème, his last appointment of the war.

== Indian Ocean service ==
In March 1784, Linois joined the storeship Barbeau, carrying supplies and despatches to the Isle de France (now Mauritius). He left Barbeau in January 1785 and in March sailed for the Caribbean on the 64-gun Réfléchi where he remained for the next two years. Arriving at Saint-Domingue on 23 April, Linois spent eight months on the frigate, Danaé before rejoining Réfléchi. In May 1786, he took a land-based post as sous-lieutenant de port at Port-au-Prince, returning to sea aboard the frigate, Proserpine in December 1786. This was a short-lived appointment; on 1 March 1787, Linois left for home on the same storeship that had conveyed him to the Isle de France two years earlier.

Another position ashore, as lieutenant de port at Brest, ended a period of unemployment that had lasted until 1 May 1789 and was followed, on 12 October 1790, by a posting to the ship-of-the-line, Victoire. From 1791 to 1793 he served with the French forces in the Indian Ocean. He left for Isle de France on 25 January on board the 32-gun frigate Atalante as second officer to Denis Decres. On 15 May, the newly published naval list named Linois as ship-of-the-line lieutenant with his promotion backdated to 1 May 1789. On their return home in April 1794, Decres was arrested as an aristocrat and Linois was given command of Atalante.

== The Brest Fleet ==
While acting as a decoy for an important convoy of wheat from the United States, Linois was captured by the Royal Navy at the action of 7 May 1794. On 5 May, Atalante, in company with the corvette Levrette, encountered a British convoy three days out from Cork. The convoy was under the protection of two ships of the line, the 74 HMS Swiftsure and the 64-gun HMS St Albans, which immediately hoisted their colours and opened fire. Linois realising he was outgunned, as senior officer, ordered his ships to divide and effect an escape. Levrette; managed to evade her pursuer, St Albans during the night but Atalante was unable to shake off Swiftsure which continued her chase throughout the following day. By 0325 on 7 May, Atalante had been overhauled and so badly damaged during the two-day running battle, Linois was forced to surrender. He and his crew were taken prisoner and Atalante was eventually taken into the Royal Navy as HMS Espion

Linois was exchanged and returned home in March 1795. He was promoted to ship-of-the-line captain in May, backdated to January 1794, taking command of the 74-gun Formidable of the Brest Fleet. The following year, in June, he was captured again at the Battle of Groix, when his ship was one of the three rearmost in Villaret's withdrawing squadron. He was twice wounded in the battle and lost the sight of an eye. He was quickly exchanged and returned in August. In 1796 he took part in the Expédition d'Irlande as a chief of division, leading a 3-ship of the line and 4-frigate squadron, with his flag on Nestor. On arrival in Bantry Bay, the generals opposed a landing, and the squadron headed back to Brest. Linois moved his flag to the 74-gun Jean-Jacque Rousseau on 22 April 1798 and in the following February, took up the position of Chief of Staff at Brest.

== Admiral ==
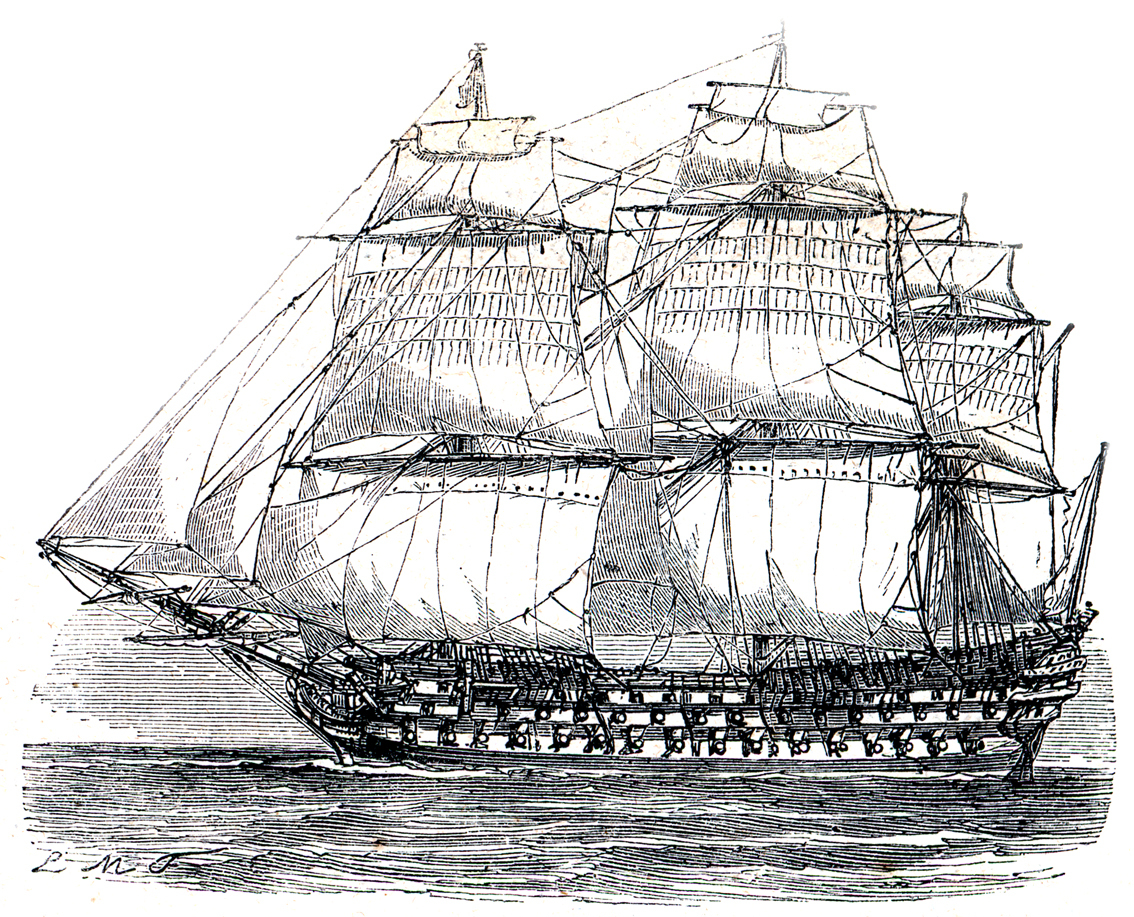
Océan, which Linois served on in 1799

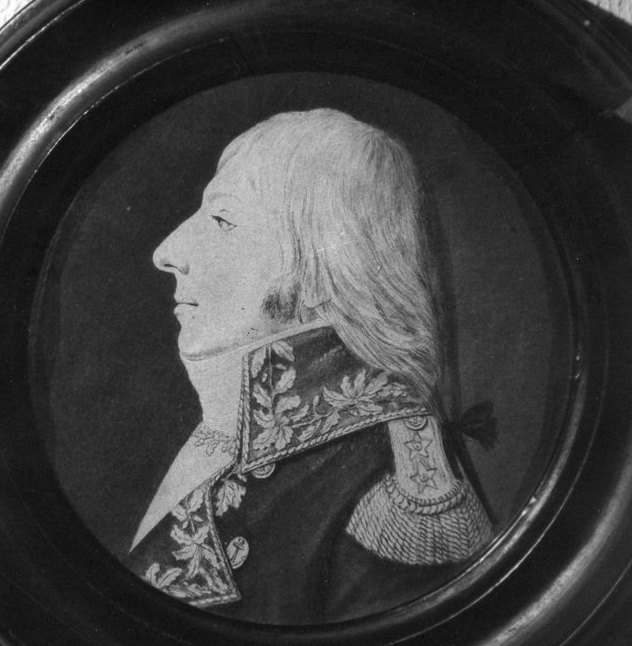
c. 1800 miniature portrait of Linois

In 1799 Linois was promoted to counter admiral and sent to the Mediterranean under Vice-admiral Étienne Eustache Bruix. He joined the 120-gun flagship, Océan, in which he took part in the Croisière de Bruix. On 8 August, the expedition returned to Brest where Linois continued as Chief of Staff until 28 October 1800, when he was posted to Toulon as second in command to Admiral Ganteaume.

Linois did not join Ganteaume in the unsuccessful attempt to bolster the French forces in Egypt but instead commanded the remainder of the Toulon fleet at the Siege of Porto Ferrajo and orchestrated the attack on Elba in May 1801. In June, with Ganteaume still on manoeuvres, Linois was ordered to assemble a new combined French and Spanish naval force at Cádiz. Aboard Formidable and in company with Desaix, Indomptable and Muiron, he set sail on 13 June, passing Gibraltar on 3 July and capturing the British brig Speedy. After hearing from Speedy's captain, Thomas Lord Cochrane, that a powerful squadron under Sir James Saumarez was blockading Cádiz, Linois sought shelter beneath the Spanish guns of Algeciras. In addition to these land batteries, by the time Saumerez arrived with six ships-of-the-line, either end of the French line had been reinforced with Spanish gunboats. Linois' squadron was thus able to prevail during the first part of the Algeciras campaign, aided by a lack of wind which prevented Saumarez' force arriving as one and left the British ships drifting helplessly. HMS Hannibal ran aground and was captured.

Both sides were still effecting repairs when, on 9 July, the French were joined by five Spanish ships-of-the-line from Cádiz. This combined fleet left for Cádiz at dawn on 12 July and Saumarez, who had been reinforced by HMS Superb, followed, intending to harass the Franco-Spanish fleet once it had moved out of range of the shore guns. Hannibal caused problems and at 19:45, Indienne was ordered to tow her back to Algeciras. The Spanish commander then turned the fleet towards Cádiz, heading into the Gut of Gibraltar. The British followed and at 20:40, Saumerez ordered independent action.

Superb was first into the action, engaging Real Carlos. Some of the shot was high and passed through her rigging, hitting the ship to her larboard, San Hermenegildo. Thinking the shot came from Real Carlos and that she was an enemy, San Hermenegildo fired into her. In about ten minutes the Real Carlos was on fire. When San Hermenegildo crossed her stern to deliver a raking fire, a sudden gust of wind brought them together and the fire spread through both ships, which subsequently blew up. In the meantime, Superb had moved on and forced the surrender of San Antonio. An independently sailing, Spanish frigate was also sunk during the battle but the remaining French and Spanish ships escaped into Cádiz the following morning. Linois was commended for his part in the battle and the previous one on 6 July, and received the 'Sabre of Honour' from Napoleon. He and his combined fleet however, were blockaded in Cádiz until peace negotiations began with Britain in October.

Early in 1802, Linois participated in an expedition to Saint-Domingue to depose the governor, Toussaint Louverture and reassert French control there. Louverture was a former slave who was suspected of trying to gain independence for the colony. In January Linois took command of a squadron of troopships, comprising three ships-of-the-line and three frigates, and sailed out to reinforce the 20,000 troops already there. The campaign was ultimately unsuccessful and Linois returned to France on 31 May.

== Napoleonic Wars ==
In 1803 Napoleon appointed him to command the French forces in the Indian Ocean and to convey the new Captain-General of French India, Charles Mathieu Isidore Decaen to Pondicherry. Flying his flag aboard the 74-gun-ship Marengo, Linois left Brest on 6 March with only three frigates in company; much of the French fleet still being occupied at Saint-Domingue. On arrival however, the British forces there, under Arthur Wellesley, refused to leave and Linois was obliged to detour to the Ile-de-France.

Linois received news that the war had resumed when he was joined by the 22-gun corvette, Berceau in September. Leaving half the troops to defend the Île-de-France, Linois left with the remainder and his squadron for Batavia on 8 October; raiding a British trading station on Sumatra on the way, capturing eight merchant vessels, destroying three others and setting light to three stocked warehouses. Arriving at Batavia on 10 December, Linois was appraised of a British convoy returning from China. After dropping off the soldiers and adding the 16 gun brig-corvette, Adventurier, to his force, set sail on 28 December.

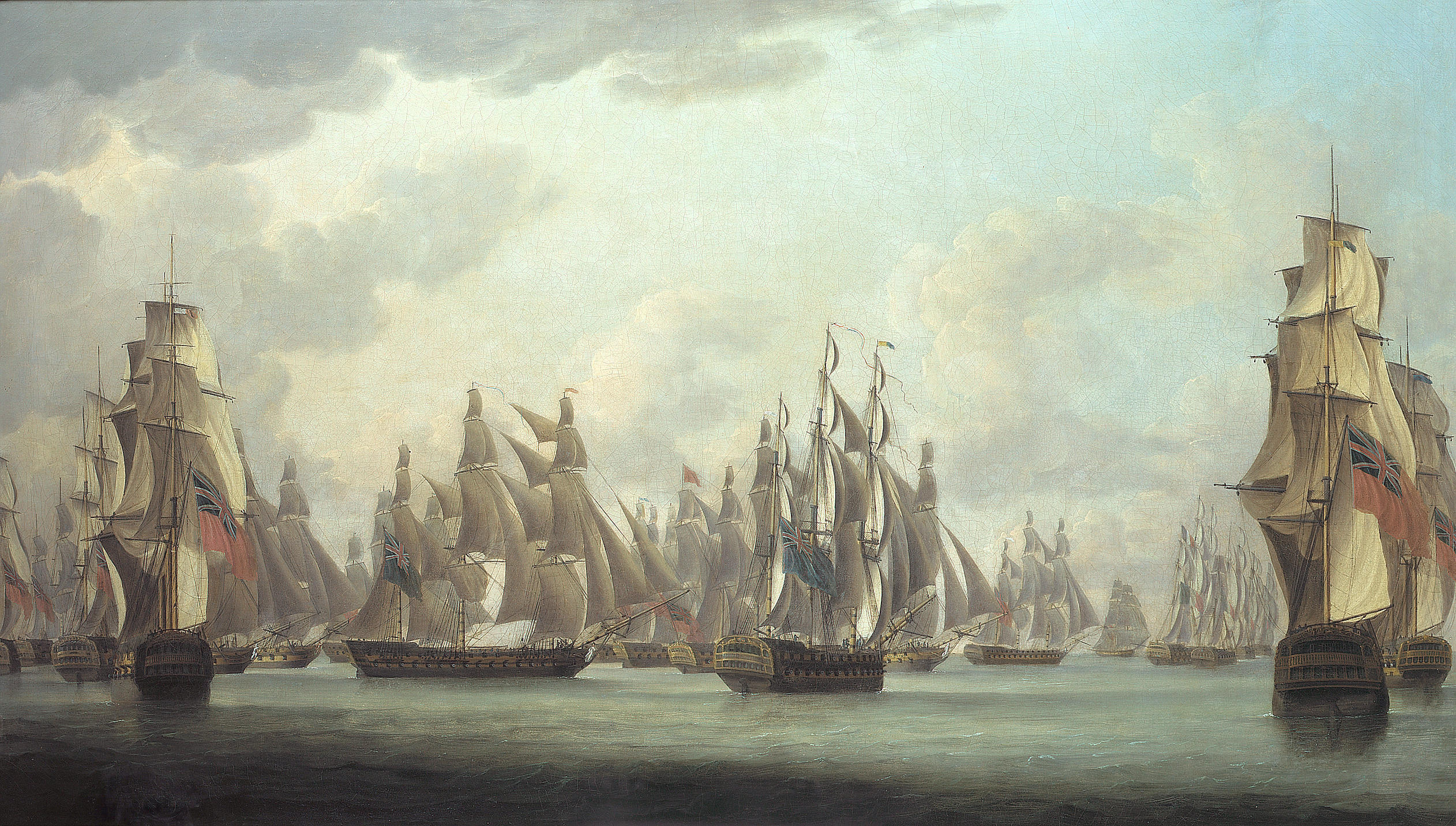
Linois' squadron being defeated at the Battle of Pulo Aura

The Battle of Pulo Aura occurred on 14 February 1804 when Linois' squadron encountered the British China Fleet. Although lightly armed, the British merchant ships outnumbered Linois' forces and manoeuvred as though preparing to defend themselves. Some of the larger indiamen, with gun ports painted on and flying naval ensigns, formed a mock line of battle. With these tactics, the convoy commodore, Nathaniel Dance, fooled Linois into believing that the British fleet was defended by naval escorts and the French retired without attacking the virtually defenceless British.

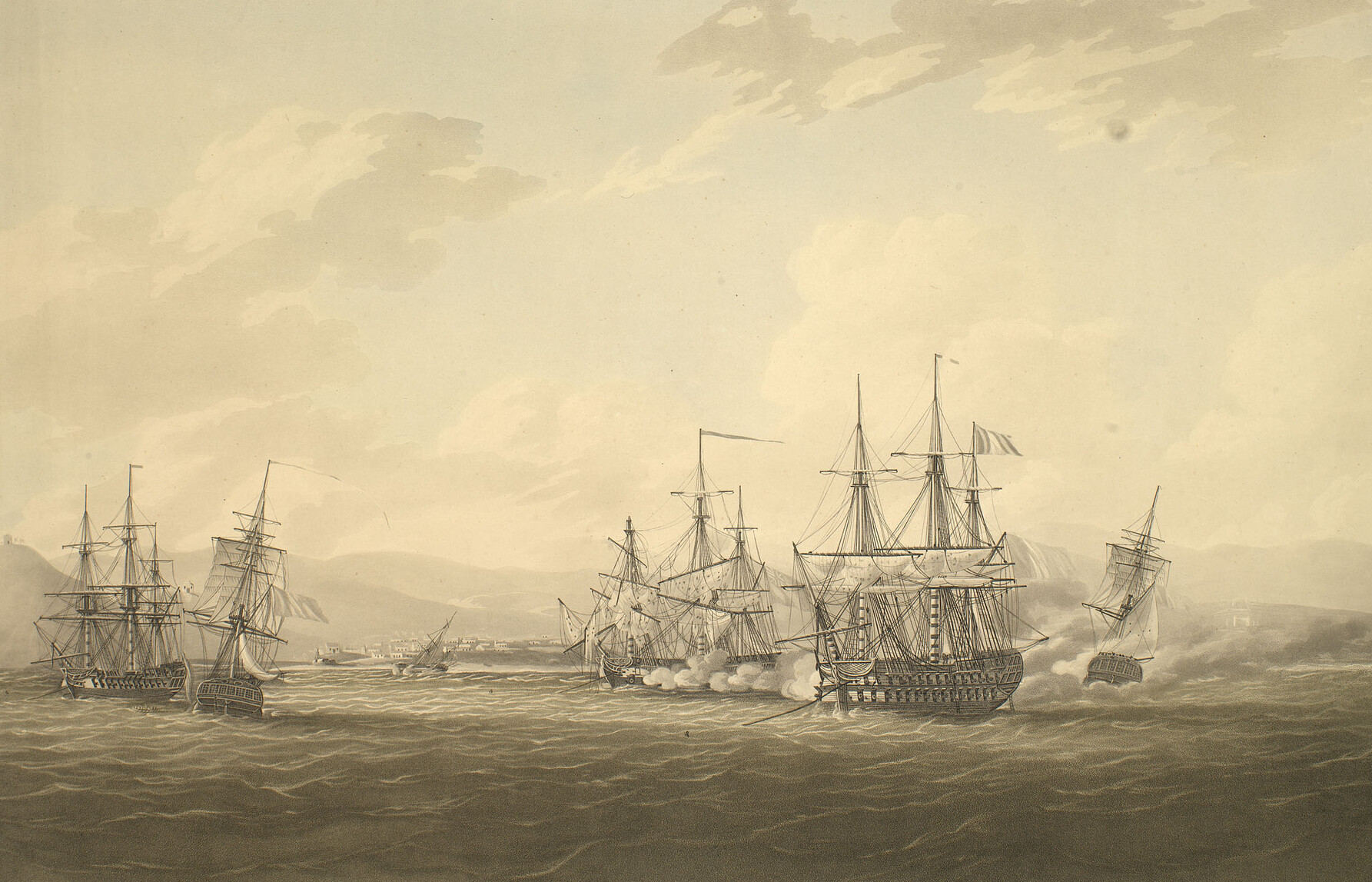
The Battle of Visakhapatnam, at which Linois fought a contested engagement

In June, Linois embarked on a second cruise, this time minus the 40-gun Belle Poule, which was despatched on a separate mission. Setting out in Marengo with the 44-gun Atalante and Semillante, Linois first scoured the channel between Mozambique and Madagascar, before crossing the Indian Ocean to patrol the waters around Ceylon. After taking some lucrative prizes, Linois headed up the Coromandel Coast to Visakhapatnam, having heard about a British convoy heading there. The French squadron arrived on 18 September to find two British East Indiamen loading in the roadstead, under the protection of the 50-gun HMS Centurion and 3 guns on the shore. Linois was cautious and, after Atalante had been chased off, decided to engage Centurion from distance. The damage inflicted by both ships therefore was superficial but while Centurion was occupied, Semilante was able to capture one of the Indiamen and drive the other onto the shore. On the return journey, Linois' ships took another prize, and arrived at Île-de-France on 1 November, to find Belle Poule with a capture of her own.

In May 1805, while Atalante and Semilante were attending to other duties, Linois took Marengo and Belle Poule into the South Atlantic. This cruise was not productive and, after visiting Cape Town, the squadron patrolled the east coast of Africa and the Red Sea. This also proved fruitless and it was not until 11 July, following a decision to search the sea lanes between Cape Town and Ceylon that any enemy vessels were encountered. It was off the coast of Ceylon they fell in with two unprotected merchant ships, one of which was driven onto the shore and the other, the east indiaman Brunswick, captured. With Brunswick under a prize crew, the squadron sailed for the Cape of Good Hope and at 16:00 on 6 August it encountered a convoy of ten east indiamen, accompanied by the 90-gun HMS Blenheim. Linois sent Brunswick to Île-de-France and, with his remaining ships, fell down on the rear of the convoy. Unable to scatter the convoy and pick off prizes piecemeal, Marengo and Belle Poule sailed along its flank, engaging Blenheim for 30 minutes, on the way. By the time Belle Poule and Marengo had completed their pass at 18:00, they both required repairs; the former had received two holes in the hull and the latter, damage to the mainmast and foreyard. During the hours of darkness, the two French ships crossed the bows of the convoy and in the morning, occupied the weather gage. Two further attacks were made during the day but the French were unable to make an impression and with ammunition supplies dwindling, Linois gave the order to withdraw.

Having spent 17 weeks at sea, on 13 September, Linois' ships entered Simon's Bay for some much needed repairs. During the eight week stay, they were briefly reunited with Atalante which, shortly after arrival, foundered. The crew was saved but the ship could not be. On 11 November, Marengo and Belle Poule left on a cruise of the west coast of Africa, travelling as far as Cape Lopez, Gabon, but only managing to secure a ship and a brig. With only two ships at his disposal, Linois' options had dwindled to chasing lone ships and unarmed convoys. Realising his best chance of catching them was to scout around choke points, in December, his small squadron sailed for the popular British stop over of St Helena. On 29 January 1806, Linois learned from an American ship of the British capture of Cape Town. With the last accessible port closed, Linois could only turn around and head for home.

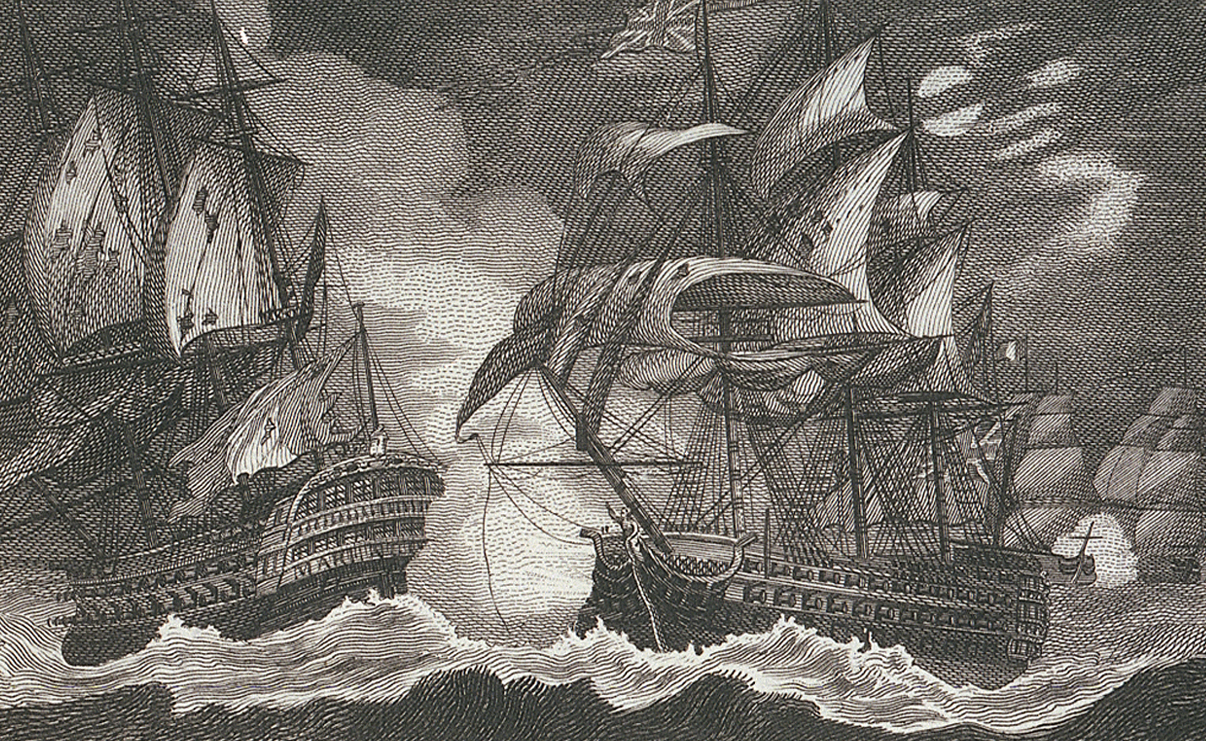
HMS London capturing Linois' flagship Marengo at the action of 13 March 1806

On the return journey to France, Marengo and Belle Poule encountered a large British squadron under Admiral Warren off Cape Verde. In the action of 13 March 1806, the 90-gun HMS London, the 80-gun HMS Foudroyant and the 38-gun frigate HMS Amazon, were sailing some miles ahead of their compatriots when, at 03:00, Linois' ships were spotted. The three British ships immediately gave chase and by 05:30, London had overhauled and begun an exchange with both French ships. By 06:00 Linois realised that he was unable to win the battle and attempted to move off, issuing orders for Belle Poule to do likewise.

Both Marengo and Belle Poule had been severely battered in the rigging and were finding it increasingly difficult to manoeuvre. Marengo could not avoid London's continuing fire or the cannonade from Amazon as she passed in pursuit of Belle Poule. London too had been heavily damaged and was beginning to drift astern but the appearance of Foudroyant, and HMS Repulse at 10:25 and HMS Ramillies at 11:00, left the French ships with no option but to surrender.

== Later life and death ==
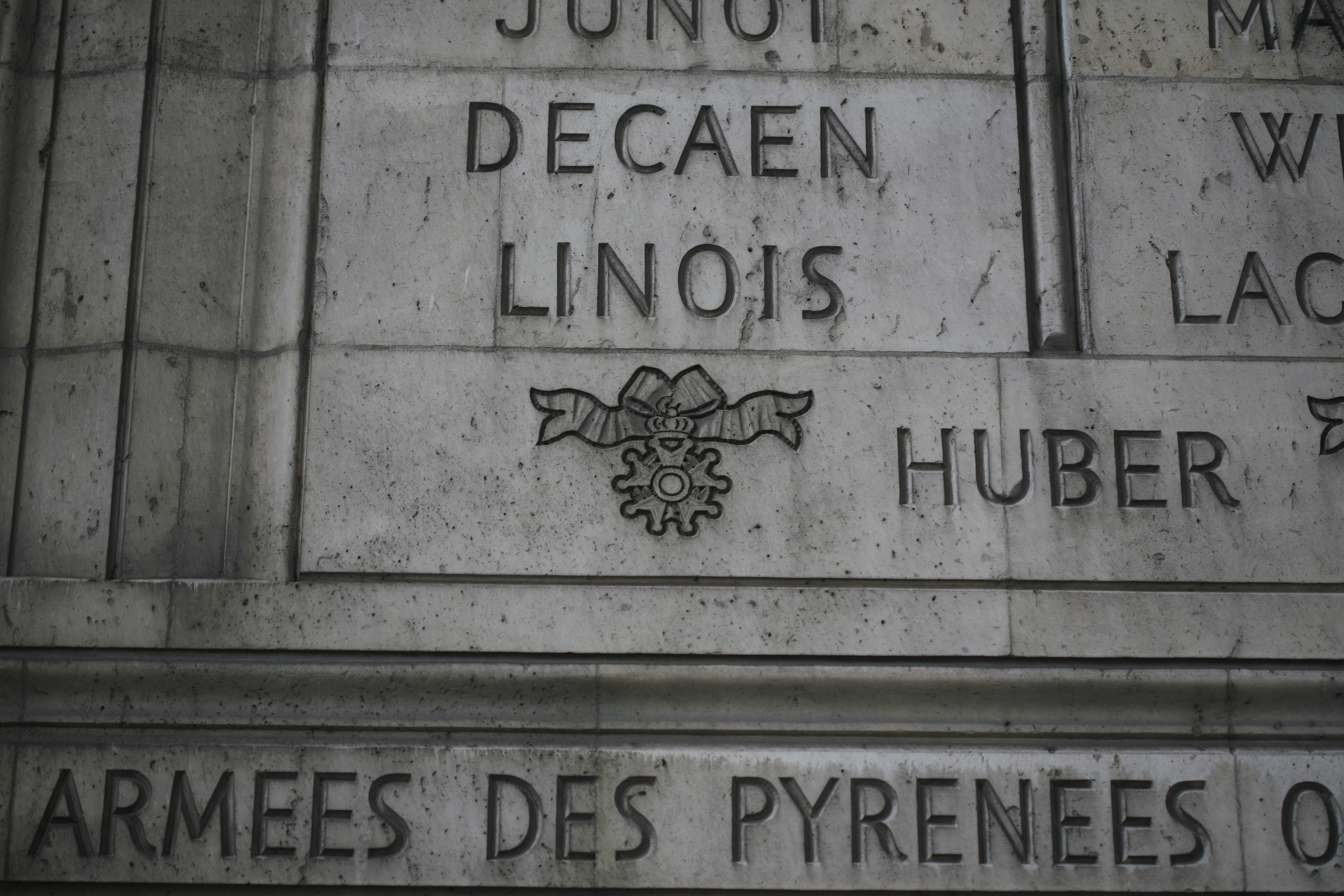
Linois' name on the Arc de Triomphe

Linois had been wounded and was captured again. Napoleon had ended the practice of exchanging officers and Linois remained a prisoner of war until Napoleon fell in 1814. In 1810, while held by the British, Linois was named Comte de Linois by Napoleon. After the Bourbon restoration, Louis XVIII named him to be Governor of Guadeloupe. During the Hundred Days, Linois finally declared for Napoleon, but news of the emperor's return did not reach the West Indies until the day after the Battle of Waterloo. An invasion force comprising British and Bourbon troops invaded Guadeloupe on 8 August and Linois capitulated to them two days later. Upon his return to France, Linois was forced to resign. He was court martialled but acquitted on 11 March 1816. However, he was placed in retirement and never served again although he was appointed as an honorary Vice-Admiral in May 1825 and Grand Officer of the Legion of Honour in March 1831. He lived in Versailles, where he died in 1848. His name is inscribed on the Arc de Triomphe.

== In popular culture ==
Linois is a minor, but highly respected, character in the Aubrey–Maturin series by Patrick O'Brian. Frederick Marryat describes the Battle of Pulo Aura in his 1832 novel Newton Forster. Linois (Charles Léon Durand) appears in the naval combat tutorial mission in Napoleon: Total War. The mission features gameplay for the French in the First Battle of Algeciras.
