= Léonard-Bernard Motard =

Léonard-Bernard Motard (French pronunciation: [le.ɔnaʁ bɛʁnaʁ mɔtaʁ]; Honfleur, 27 July 1771 – Honfleur, 26 May 1852) was a French naval officer and eventually contre-amiral.

Motard enlisted in the French Navy in 1786. He was promoted to ensign in 1791, to lieutenant in 1793, and to capitaine de frégate in 1797. He then served in Brueys's general staff.

Motard helped organise the naval component of the Napoleonic Campaign in Egypt, and took part in the Battle of the Nile aboard the flagship Orient. He evacuated her before she exploded, but sustained severe injuries and was taken prisoner by the British.

After he was released, Motard served as staff officer to Ganteaume, taking part in operations in Saint Domingue.

Promoted to capitaine de vaisseau in 1803, he took command of the 32-gun Sémillante, in Linois' squadron. He took part in the Battle of Pulo Aura on 14 February 1804.

On 8 June 1806, Sémillante captured the East Indiamen Acteon, Warren Hastings, and Active. On 11 November, the encountered HMS Sceptre and HMS Cornwallis; an engagement developed on 13 November, from which the British retreated.

Between 15 March and 18 March 1808, Sémillante fought a running battle with HMS Terpsichore, and escaped to Île de France. Motard sustained life-threatening injuries and returned to France.

In December 1809, Motard was elevated to commander of the Legion of Honour. In November 1810, he was made a baron of Empire. From 4 January 1811, he headed the École spéciale de Marine in Toulon.

He retired with the rank of contre-amiral in 1814.
