= Desnoeufs Island =

Island in Seychelles

Desnœufs Island
Nickname: Île des Nœufs
- Location within Seychelles

Geography
- Location: Indian Ocean
- Coordinates: 06°14′S 53°32′E
- Archipelago: Seychelles
- Adjacent to: Indian Ocean
- Total islands: 1
- Major islands: Desnœufs
- Area: 0.457 km^{2} (0.176 sq mi)
- Length: 0.75 km (0.466 mi)
- Width: 0.7 km (0.43 mi)
- Coastline: 2.6 km (1.62 mi)
- Highest elevation: 5.5 m (18 ft)

Administration
- Seychelles
- Group: Outer Islands
- Sub-Group: Amirante Islands
- Districts: Outer Islands District

Demographics
- Population: 0 (2014)
- Pop. density: 0/km^{2} (0/sq mi)
- Ethnic groups: Creole, French, East Africans, Indians.

Additional information
- Time zone: SCT (UTC+4)
- ISO code: SC-26
- Official website: www.seychelles.travel/en/discover/the-islands/outer-islands

Desnœufs Island is an island in Seychelles, lying at the southern edge of the Amirantes group, in the Outer Islands, with a distance of 321 km south of Victoria, Seychelles.

== History ==
The origin of the name seems to be its French meaning, "one of nine", as it is one of the nine main islands of the Amirantes.

== Geography ==
Desnœufs Island is the southernmost island of the Amirantes chain, is a nearly circular island with a high rim surrounding a central depression (instead of a lagoon). It is up to 5.5 m high. Most of the land is exposed sandstone, after the guano has been exploited in the 20th century. The island has a fringing reef, and the reef flat is narrow. Landing can be extremely difficult, with heavy swells sweeping round the island even during the calmest sea conditions.

== Administration ==
The island belongs to Outer Islands District. Being an island with a small population, there are not any government buildings or services. For many services, people have to go to Victoria, which is a difficult task.

== Economics ==
The occasional villagers of Marie Louise Island used to poach eggs illegally on the island when the island was a base for the commercial exploitation of seabirds, especially the eggs of the sooty tern (Onychoprion fuscatus). recent years the island was made a reservation, and is visited once a year shortly by IDC members and scientists from Mahe. There are ruins on the island from the time of the poaching.

== Flora and fauna ==
The terrestrial vegetation on the island is limited because of the high number of seabirds. The island is almost treeless and is covered by grasses and other low-growing plants. It has been identified as an Important Bird Area (IBA) by BirdLife International because it supports a breeding population of 430,000 pairs of sooty terns, and a large number of boobies. Green and hawksbill sea turtles also nest there. The island is also known for its rich fish life.

== Image gallery ==
Map 1

District Map
