= Ganges (1797 EIC ship) =

History

British East India Company
- Name: Ganges
- Namesake: Ganges
- Owner: William Moffat
- Builder: Wells, Deptford
- Launched: 13 February 1797
- Fate: Sank 1807

General characteristics
- Tons burthen: 1502, or 15028/94, or 1549 (bm)
- Length: Overall:145 ft 6 in (44.3 m); Keel:118 ft 7 in (36.1 m)
- Beam: 43 ft 7 in (13.3 m)
- Depth of hold: 14 ft 0 in (4.3 m)
- Complement: 1797:140; 1799:135; 1803:145; 1805:135
- Armament: 1797: 30 × 12-pounder guns; 1799: 36 × 6-, 2-, & 18-pounder guns; 1803: 30 × 12- & 18-pounder guns; 1805: 30 × 12- & 18-pounder guns

Ganges was a large, three-decker East Indiaman, launched in 1797. She made three complete voyages between Britain and China for the British East India Company. On her third voyage she participated in the singular Battle of Pulo Auro. She sank on the homeward leg of her fourth voyage, but with no loss of life.

== Career ==
=== Voyage #1 (1797–1799) ===
Captain Joseph Garnault received a letter of marque on 23 March 1797. Letters of marque authorized the master and vessel to engage in offensive action against enemy vessels should the opportunity arise.

He left Portsmouth on 5 June 1797, bound for St Helena, Benkulen and China. Ganges reached St Helena on 1 September, Benkulen on 9 December, and Whampoa on 1 March 1798. For her homeward voyage she crossed the Second Bar on 12 May, reaching the Cape on 9 September, and St Helena, in the South Atlantic, on 17 November. She arrived at Gravesend on 10 February 1799.

=== Voyage #2 (1799–1802) ===
Capt Alexander Gray received a letter of marque on 4 December 1799. He left Portsmouth on 7 January 1800, bound for Bombay and China. Ganges reached Johanna on 2 May and Bombay on 26 May. She arrived at Whampoa on 5 November. She crossed the Second Bar on 10 January 1801, reaching Penang on 5 February, Colombo on 8 March, and Bombay again on 15 April. After a long stay at Bombay, she then went back, reaching Penang on 4 October and Whampoa on 1 January 1802. For her homeward voyage she crossed the Second Bar on 1 March, reaching St Helena on 10 July, and arriving at Gravesend on 16 September.

=== Voyage #3 (1803–1804) ===
Captain William Moffat received a letter of marque on 23 February 1803. He sailed from the Downs on 6 May 1803 and Ganges arrived at Whampoa on 30 September. She started home about two months later, crossing the Second Bar on 26 November.

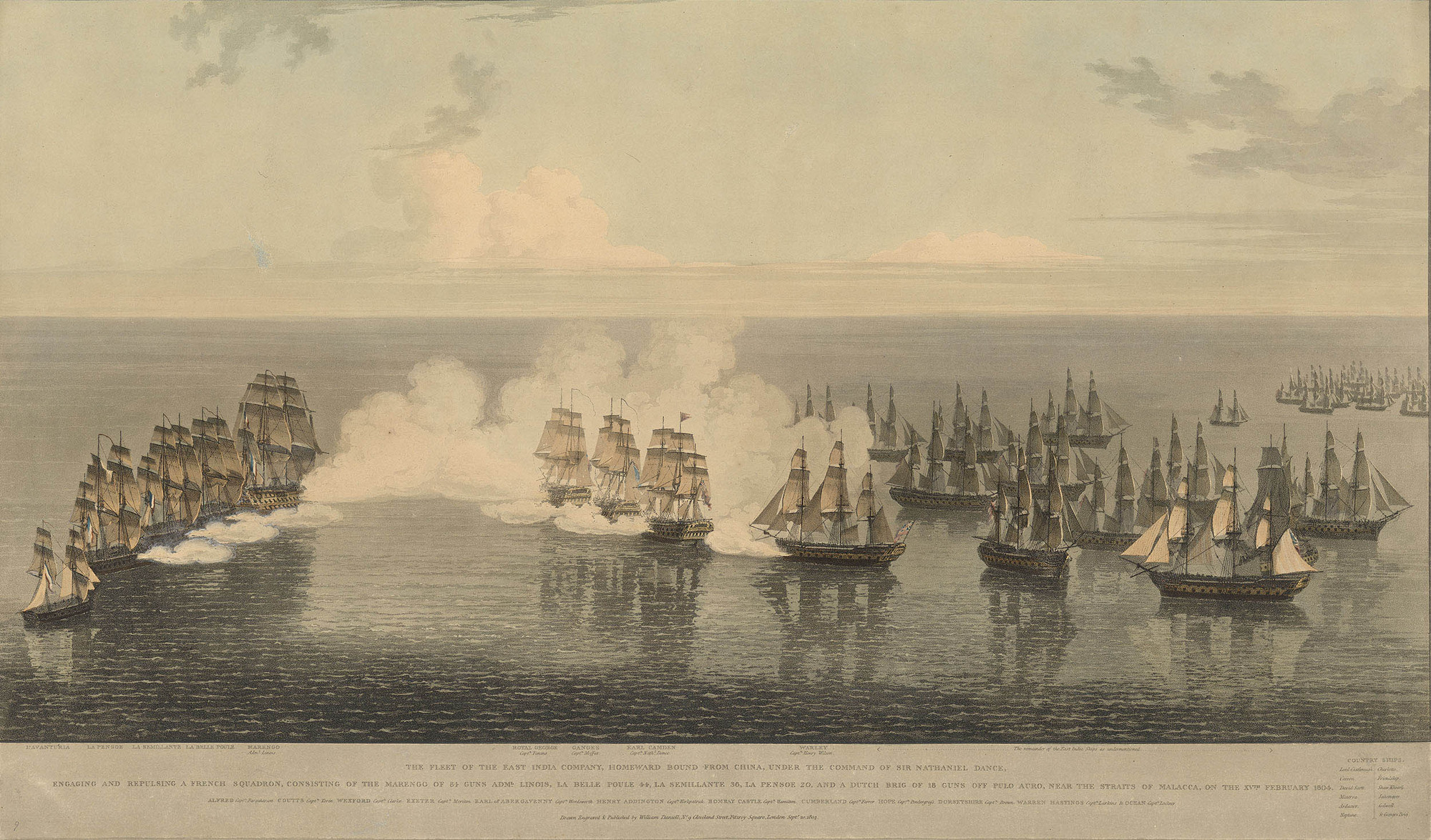
Commodore Dance's Indiamen (centre) protect the merchant fleet (right) and engage Admiral Linois's squadron (left) during the Battle of Pulo Aura, 1804. Painting by William Daniell

On 14 February 1804, a fleet of Indiamen under the command of Commodore Nathaniel Dance, which included Ganges, intimidated, drove off, and chased a powerful French naval squadron. Although the French force was much stronger than the British convoy, Dance's aggressive tactics persuaded Contre-Admiral Charles-Alexandre Durand Linois to retire after only a brief exchange of shot. Dance then chased the French warships until his convoy was out of danger, whereupon he resumed his passage towards British India. Linois later claimed that the unescorted British merchant fleet was defended by eight ships of the line, a claim criticised by contemporary officers and later historians. In the engagement Ganges was one of the first vessels to commence firing on the French. Though they returned fire, the French fire was not effective and Ganges suffered no casualties.

Ganges reached Malacca on 19 February. On 28 February, the British ships of the line HMS Sceptre and Albion joined the fleet in the Strait of Malacca. Ganges reached Malaca on 21 March. Scepter and Albion then escorted the fleet safely to St Helena, which Ganges reached on 9 June. From there HMS Plantagenet escorted the convoy to England. Ganges arrived at Greenhithe on 15 August 1804.

The EIC voted a £50,000 prize fund to be divided among the various commanders at the battle and their crews. Moffatt received 500 guineas and a piece of plate worth 100 guineas. Each seaman received six guineas. Lloyd's Patriotic Fund and other national and mercantile institutions made a series of awards of ceremonial swords, silver plate, and monetary gifts to individual officers. Lloyd's Patriotic Fund gave each captain a sword worth £50, and one worth £100 to Nathaniel Dance. Dance refused a baronetcy but was subsequently knighted.

=== Voyage #4 (1805–Loss) ===
Captain Thomas Talbot Harrington received a letter of marque on 23 February 1805. He left Portsmouth on 25 April 1805, bound for Madras, Bengal, China, and Bombay.

On 7 August 1805, HMS Blenheim, Captain Austin Bissell and Rear-Admiral Thomas Troubridge, was escorting a fleet of East Indiamen consisting of Castle Eden, Cumberland, Devonshire, Dorsetshire, Exeter, Ganges, Hope, and Preston. They were at 19°3′S 17°15′E when they encountered the French ship of the line Marengo and frigate Belle Poule. There was a brief exchange of fire before both sides sailed on. Troubridge reprimanded the captains of Cumberland and Preston for having acted too boldly in exchanging fire with the French.

Ganges reached Madras on 23 August, Saugor on 14 September, Carnicobar on 6 November, Penang on 14 November, Malacca on 1 December, and Whampoa on 1 February 1806. Homeward bound, she crossed the Second Bar on 19 March. She became leaky after having been at Penang and on 6 June the frigate Sir Edward Hughes escorted her to Bombay, which she reached on 2 July. She remained at Bombay until 27 February 1807.

== Loss ==
On 29 May 1807 Ganges was off the Cape of Good Hope when she sprang a leak. The East Indiaman Earl St Vincent, which was in company, managed to get off all 203 or 209 persons on board Ganges, including a number of soldiers from the 77th Regiment of Foot, and there was no loss of life. When Captain Harrington finally left Ganges in the last boats from Earl St Vincent, Ganges had 10 feet (3 m) of water in the well and was wholly ungovernable by the helm. She sank at noon on 30 May 1807 at 38°22′S 19°50′E, almost due south of Cape Agulhas.

The EIC put the value of its cargo lost when she sank at £126,614.
