= Hope (1797 EIC ship) =

History

Great Britain
- Name: Hope
- Owner: EIC voyages 1–2:Alexander Hume; EIC voyages:3–6 Sir Abraham Hume; EIC voyages:7–8 William Borradaile; EIC voyage 9:Richardson Borradaile
- Builder: Thomas Pitcher, Northfleet
- Launched: 13 March 1797
- Fate: Sold for breaking up in 1816

General characteristics
- Tons burthen: 1471, or 1498(bm)
- Length: 177 ft 2 in (54.0 m) (overall); 144 ft 2 1/2 in (44.0 m) (keel)
- Beam: 43 ft 9 1/2 in (13.3 m)
- Depth of hold: 17 ft 5 in (5.3 m)
- Propulsion: Sail
- Complement: 1797:120; 1803:140
- Armament: 1797:36 × 12&6-pounder guns; 1803:36 × 12&6-pounder guns
- Notes: Three decks

Hope was launched in 1797 on the Thames River. She made seven voyages for the British East India Company (EIC) before she was sold for breaking up in 1816. She was one of the East Indiamen at the battle of Pulo Aura.

== Career ==
=== EIC voyage #1 (1797–1798) ===
Captain James Horncastle acquired a letter of marque on 11 April 1797. He sailed from Portsmouth on 3 June 1797, bound for China. Hope arrived at Whampoa Anchorage on 18 December. Homeward bound, she crossed the Second Bar on 15 February 1798, reached St Helena on 5 August, and arrived at the Downs on 18 October. Horncastle remained Hope's master for two more voyages.

=== EIC voyage #2 (1799–1800) ===
Hope sailed from Portsmouth on 18 June 1799, bound for China. She reached Penang on 29 October and arrived at Whampoa on 14 January 1800. Homeward bound, she crossed the Second Bar on 10 March, reached St Helena on 15 July, and arrived at the Downs on 23 December.

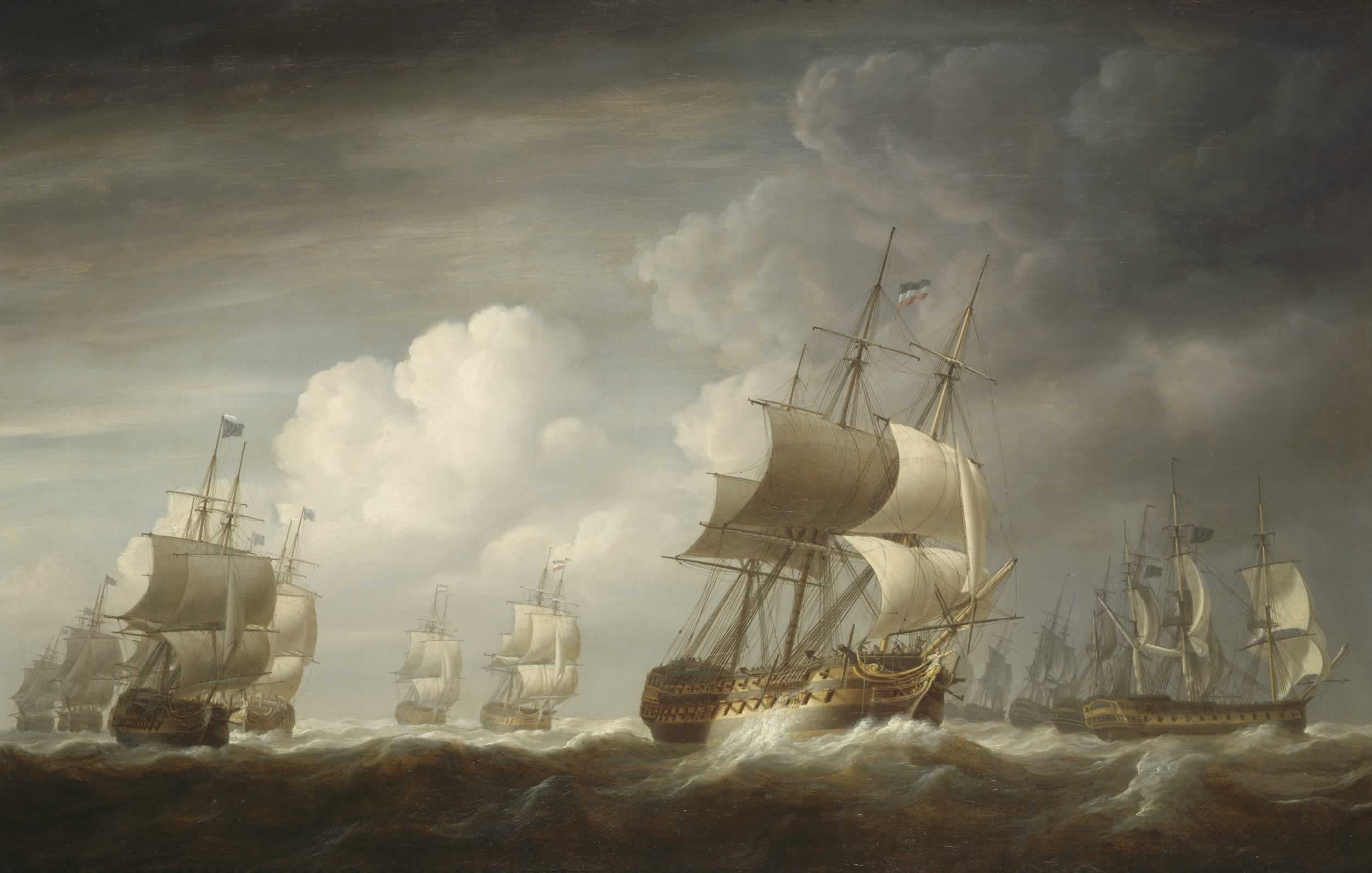
A fleet of East Indiamen at Sea, by Nicholas Pocock; it is believed to show the Indiamen Lord Hawkesbury, Worcester, Boddam, Fort William, Airly Castle, Lord Duncan, Ocean, Henry Addington, Carnatic, Hope, and Windham returning from China in 1802

=== EIC voyage #3 (1801–1802) ===
Hope sailed from Portsmouth on 31 March 1801. She reached Madras on 26 July and Penang on 28 August, before arriving at Whampoa on 29 September. Homeward bound, she crossed the Second Bar on 19 December, reached St Helena on 12 April 1802, and arrived at the Downs on 11 June.

Captain James Pendergrass would remain master of Hope for all her six remaining voyages.

=== EIC voyage #4 (1803–1804) ===
Pendergrass sailed from the Downs on 27 April 1803, bound for China. Hope arrived at Whampoa on 17 September. Two days later, he was issued a letter of marque, in England. Homeward bound, Hope was at the Second Bar on 26 November. However, the Royal Navy was unable to provide an escort and the captains of the EIC's China Fleet debated about setting out for home. Still, the China Fleet crossed the Second Bar on 31 January 1804.

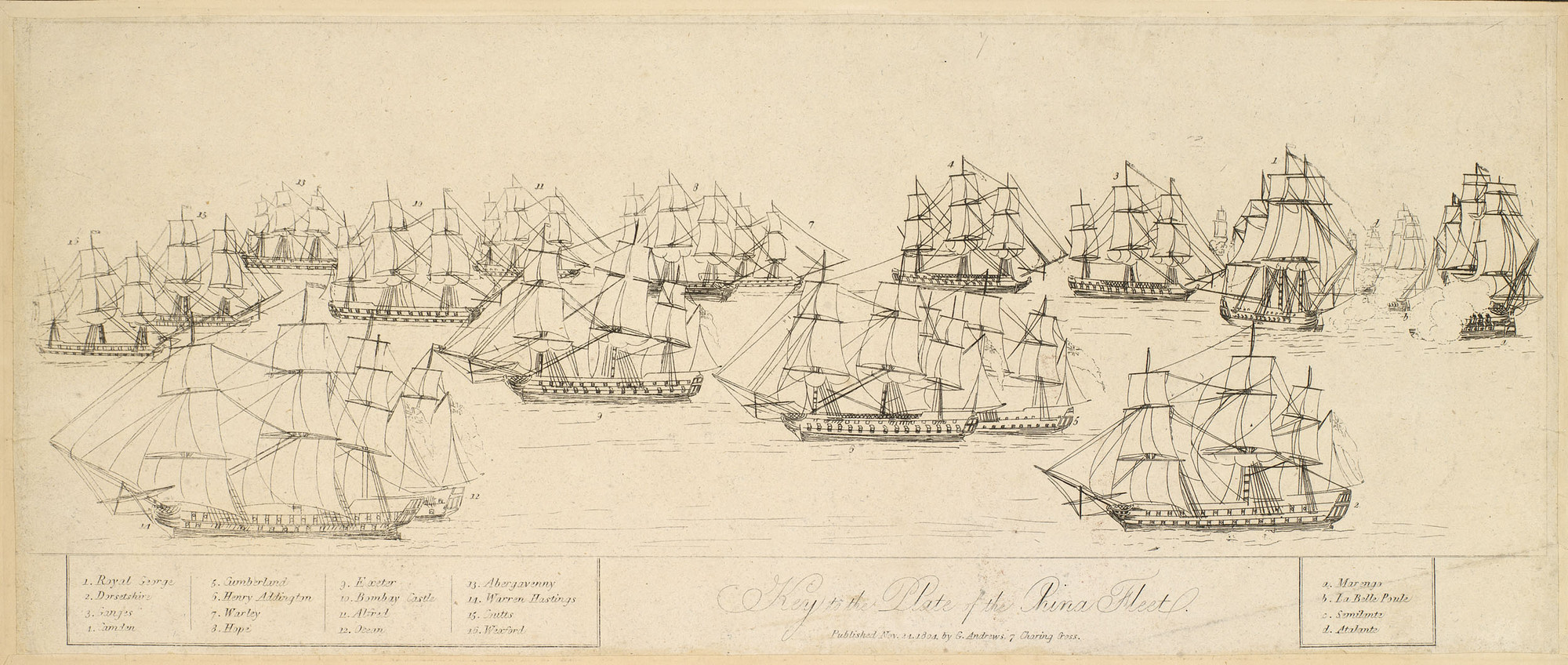
Hope can be seen in this printed key for a view of the Battle, showing the China Fleet a painting by Francis Sartorius, the younger after a drawing by an officer on board the Henry Addington

On 14 February 1804, the China Fleet, under the command of Commodore Nathaniel Dance, intimidated, drove off, and chased a powerful French naval squadron at Pulo Aura. Dance's aggressive tactics persuaded Contre-Admiral Charles-Alexandre Durand Linois to retire after only a brief exchange of fire. Dance then chased the French warships until his convoy was out of danger, whereupon he resumed his passage towards British India. Alfred was one of the Indiamen that actually exchanged fire with the French, in her case for about 15 minutes, and that at long range.

Hope reached Malacca on 18 February. On 28 February, the British ships of the line HMS Sceptre and Albion joined the Fleet in the Strait and conducted them safely to St Helena. Hope reached St Helena on 9 June. HMS Plantagenet escorted the convoy from St Helena to England. Hope arrived at the Downs on 8 August.

On their return to England Nathaniel Dance and his fellow captains were highly praised. Saving the convoy prevented both the EIC and Lloyd's of London from likely financial ruin, the repercussions of which would have had profound effects across the British Empire. The various commanders and their crews were presented with a £50,000 prize fund to be divided among them, and the Lloyd's Patriotic Fund and other national and mercantile institutions made a series of awards of ceremonial swords, silver plate and monetary gifts to individual officers. Lloyd's Patriotic Fund in particular gave each captain a sword worth 50 pounds.

=== EIC voyage #5 (1805–1806) ===
Hope sailed from Portsmouth on 25 April 1805, bound for China.

On 7 August 1805, HMS Blenheim, Captain Austin Bissell and Rear-Admiral Thomas Troubridge, was escorting a fleet of East Indiamen consisting of Castle Eden, Cumberland, Devonshire, Dorsetshire, Exeter, Ganges, Hope, and Preston. They were at 19°3′S 17°15′E when they encountered the French ship of the line Marengo and frigate Belle Poule. There was a brief exchange of fire before both sides sailed on. Troubridge reprimanded the captains of Cumberland and Preston for having acted too boldly in exchanging fire with the French.

Hope was at Madras on 23 August, Penang on 18 September, and Malacca on 22 October. She arrived at Whampoa on 27 December. Homeward bound, she crossed the Second Bar on 8 February 1806, reached Malacca on 18 March and St Helena on 2 July. She arrived at the Downs on 3 September.

Pendergrass brought with him seedlings of the Camellia japonica 'Incarnata', which he gave to Sir Abraham Hume of Wormley Bury, Hertfordshire, as a gift for Lady Amelia Hume. Sir Hume was Hope's managing owner. The camellia is also known as Lady Hume's Blush".

=== EIC voyage #6 (1807–1808) ===
Hope sailed from Portsmouth on 18 April 1807, bound for China. She was at Penang on 14 September and Malacca on 20 October. She reached Whampoa on 27 December. Homeward bound, she crossed the Second Bar on 10 February 1808, reached Penang on 5 April and St Helena on 9 July, and arrived at the Downs on 11 September.

=== EIC voyage #7 (1811–1812) ===
Hope sailed from Portsmouth on 11 March 1811, bound for Madras and China. She was at Madras on 27 July, Penang on 18 September; she arrived at Whampoa on 1 January 1812. Homeward bound, she crossed the Second Bar on 11 February, reached St Helena on 23 May, and arrived at the Downs on 22 July.

=== EIC voyage #8 (1813–1814) ===
Hope sailed from Torbay on 23 March 1813, bound for China. She reached Simons Bay on 15 June, and arrived at Whampoa on 6 September. Homeward bound, she crossed the Second Bar on 5 January 1814, reached St Helena on 26 May, and arrived at the Downs on 7 August.

=== EIC voyage #9 (1815–1816) ===
Captain Pendergrass sailed from the Downs on 3 April 1815, bound for China. Hope reached Whampoa on 13 September. Homeward bound, she crossed the Second Bar on 14 November, reached St Helena on 2 March 1816, and arrived in the Downs on 29 April.

When Hope arrived back at London she discharged her crew, including her Chinese sailors hired in Canton. Princess Amelia repatriated 26 to Canton, together with 354 others, leaving the Downs on 20 July 1816.

== Fate ==
Hope was sold in 1816 for breaking up.
