= Cumberland (1802 ship) =

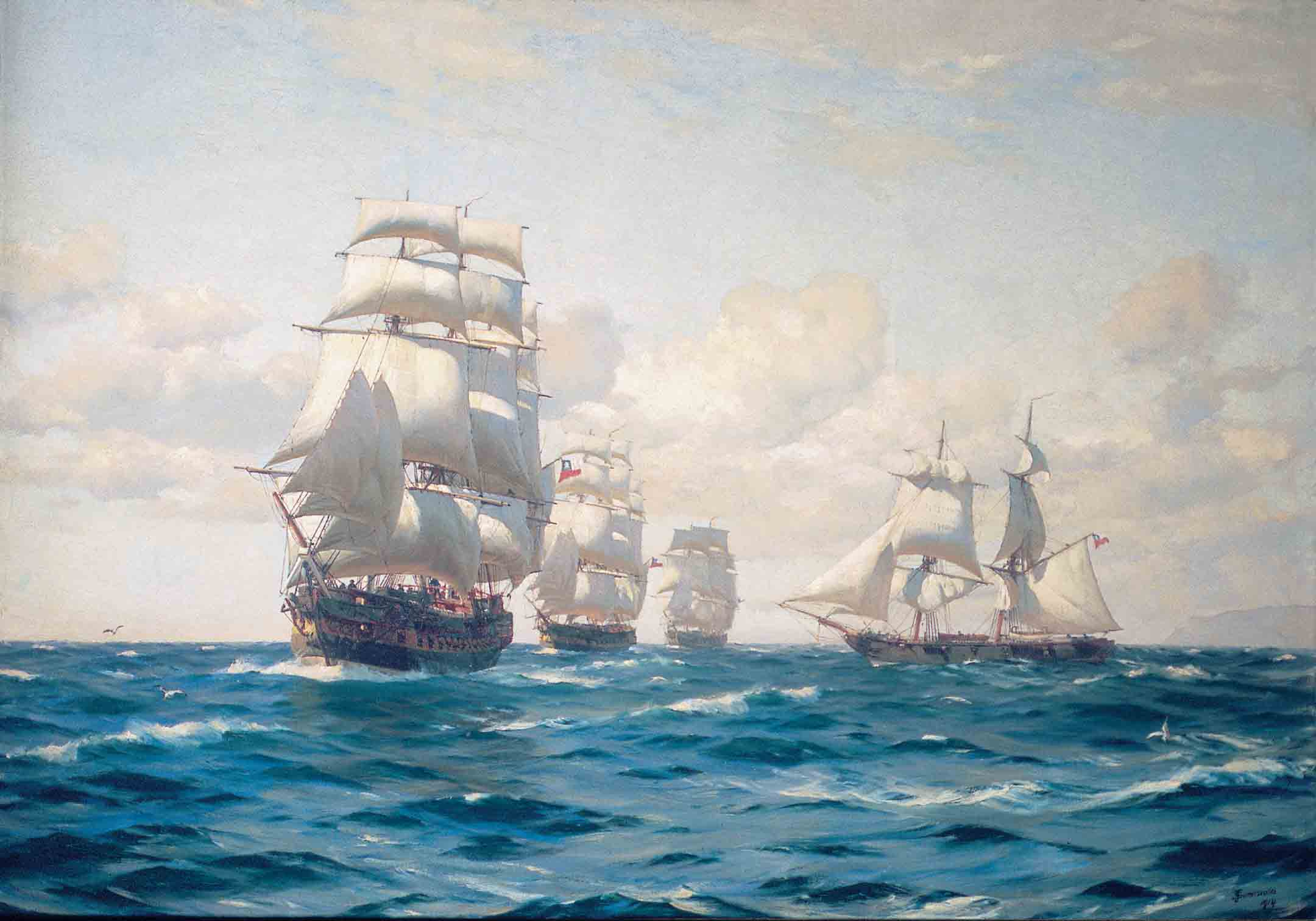
- The First Chilean Navy Squadron, from left to right, San Martin (ex-Cumberland), Lautaro, Chacabuco, and Araucano in a painting by Thomas Somerscales

History

United Kingdom
- Name: Cumberland
- Owner: EIC Voyages 1-6:William Borradaile; EIC Voyage 7: Richardson Borradaile
- Operator: Honourable East India Company
- Route: England–India & China
- Builder: Dudman's Dock, Deptford
- Launched: 11 November 1802
- Honours and awards: Battle of Pulo Aura
- Fate: Sold to Chile 1818

Chile
- Name: San Martín
- Namesake: José de San Martín
- Cost: $140,000 ($200,000?)
- Acquired: 20 August 1818
- Out of service: 27 September 1828
- Honours and awards: Capture of Reina María Isabel, Perla, and San Miguel
- Fate: Beached off Chorrilos, Peru in 1821

General characteristics
- Class & type: East Indiaman
- Tons burthen: 1260, 126062/94, or 1355 (bm)
- Length: 165 ft 6 1/2 in (50.5 m) (overall); 133 ft 10 in (40.8 m) (keel)
- Beam: 42 ft 1 in (12.8 m)
- Depth of hold: 17 ft 2 in (5.2 m)
- Propulsion: Sail
- Crew: Cumberland: 130; San Martin: 456
- Armament: Cumberland: 36 × 18-pounder guns; San Martin: 64 guns

The ship Cumberland was launched in 1802 as a 3-decker East Indiaman. She made seven voyages between India and England from 1802 to 1815 for the British East India Company. Her most notable voyage was her second when she fought in the Battle of Pulo Aura against a French squadron. In 1818 the Chilean government arranged for her purchase. When she arrived in Chile the Chileans took her into their navy as San Martín. As part of the First Chilean Navy Squadron she participated in 1818 in the defeat of a Spanish expeditionary force. She was wrecked off the coast of Peru in 1821.

== East Indiaman ==
=== Voyage #1 (1803-04) ===
Captain William Ward Farrer sailed Cumberland for the Cape, Bengal, and China, leaving the Downs on 30 January 1803. When the Napoleonic Wars broke out shortly after his departure, the EIC arranged for him to receive a letter of marque, which would authorise him to act offensively against French shipping, should the opportunity arise. Captain William Ward Tarres received a letter of marque on 20 June 1803. Cumberland reached the Cape on 27 March, and Madras on 19 May. From there she sailed to Penang, which she reached on 7 July, and Malacca, on 30 July. She arrived at Whampoa on 25 August. She was at the Second Bar on 30 October. She left China on 6 February 1804.

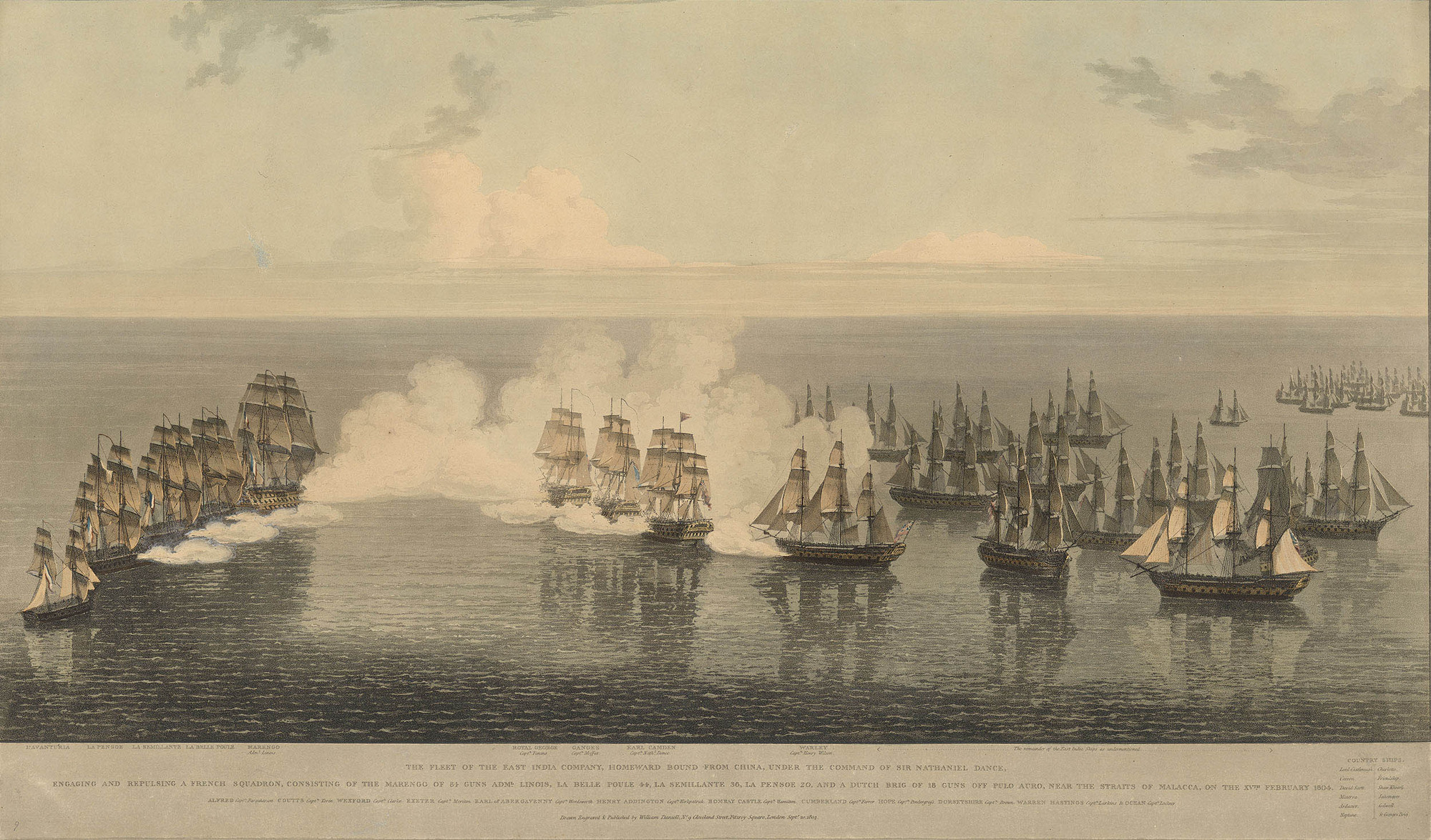
Commodore Dance's Indiamen (centre) protect the merchant fleet (right) and engage Admiral Linois's squadron (left) during the Battle of Pulo Aura, 1804. Painting by William Daniell

On 14 February a fleet of Indiamen under the command of Commodore Nathaniel Dance, which included Cumberland, intimidated, drove off, and chased a powerful French naval squadron. Although the French force was much stronger than the British convoy, Dance's aggressive tactics persuaded Contre-Admiral Charles-Alexandre Durand Linois to retire after only a brief exchange of shot. Dance then chased the French warships until his convoy was out of danger, whereupon he resumed his passage towards British India. Linois later claimed that the unescorted British merchant fleet was defended by eight ships of the line, a claim criticised by contemporary officers and later historians.

Cumberland reached Malacca on 18 February and Penang on 3 March, and St Helena on 10 June. She arrived at Long Reach on 14 August.

The EIC voted a £50,000 prize fund to be divided among the various commanders at the battle and their crews. Farrer received 500 guineas, and also a piece of plate worth 50 guineas. Lloyd's Patriotic Fund and other national and mercantile institutions made a series of awards of ceremonial swords, silver plate, and monetary gifts to individual officers. Lloyd's Patriotic Fund gave each captain a sword worth £50, and one worth £100 to Nathaniel Dance. Dance refused a baronetcy but was subsequently knighted.

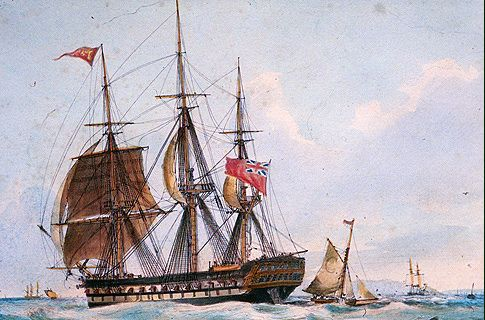
Cumberland

=== Voyage #2 (1805-06) ===
This voyage also saw combat, but of a more minor sort. Farrer left Portsmouth on 25 April 1805, bound for Madras and China.

On 7 August 1805, HMS Blenheim, Captain Austin Bissell and Rear-Admiral Thomas Troubridge, was escorting a fleet of East Indiamen consisting of Castle Eden, Cumberland, Devonshire, Dorsetshire, Exeter, Ganges, Hope, and Preston. They were at 19°3′S 17°15′E when they encountered the French ship of the line Marengo and frigate Belle Poule. There was a brief exchange of fire before both sides sailed on. Troubridge reprimanded the captains of Cumberland and Preston for having acted too boldly in exchanging fire with the French.

Cumberland reached Madras on 23 August, Penang on 18 September, and Malacca on 22 October, arriving at Whampoa on 20 December. On her homeward leg, Cumberland passed Macao on 6 February 1806, and reached Malacca on 18 March, Penang on 27 March, and St Helena on 2 July. On 13 September she arrived at Long Reach.

=== Voyage #3 (1807-08) ===
Farrer left Portsmouth on 26 February 1807 for Madras and China. Cumberland returned to her moorings in Britain on 30 June 1808.

=== Voyage #4 (1808-10) ===
Captain Peter Wedderburn received a letter of marque for Cumberland on 17 December 1808. She left Portsmouth on 24 February 1809 bound for Bombay and China. She reached Bombay on 25 June, Penang on 31 August, and Macao on 18 October, arriving at Whampoa on 4 November. For her return journey she crossed the Second Bar on 22 December, reaching St Helena on 21 May 1810 and arriving at Long Reach on 2 August.

=== Voyage #5 (1811-1812) ===
Captain Thomas Hutton Wilkinson received a letter of marque on 14 March 1811. He left Torbay on 16 February 1811, bound for Bombay and China. Cumberland reached Simon's Bay on 28 April and arrived at Bombay on 8 June. From there she sailed to Penang (21 August), and arrived at Whampoa on 2 October. On her homeward journey she crossed the Second Bar on 2 December, and reached St Helena on 21 March 1812. She arrived at Long Reach on 15 May Long Reach.

=== Voyage #6 (1813-14) ===
Wilkinson left Portsmouth on 18 March 1813 for China. Cumberland reached Tenerife on 11 April and the Cape on 11 June. She arrived at Whampoa on 6 September. On 5 January 1814 she crossed the Second Bar, reaching St Helena on 26 May, and arriving at Long Reach on 10 August.

=== Voyage #7 (1816-17) ===
Wilkinson left the Downs on 23 January 1816, bound for Bombay and China. Cumberland arrived at Bombay on 15 May, reached Malacca on 6 August, and arrived at Whampoa on 3 September. She crossed the Second Bar on 24 December and reached St Helena on 12 March 1817. She arrived at Long Reach on 16 May.

== Chilean Navy ==
Bernardo O'Higgins, head of the Chilean government, instructed the government's agent in London, José Antonio Álvarez Condarco, to arrange for the purchase of Cumberland. Cumberland sailed for Valparaiso on 13 February 1818.

She arrived in Chile on 22 May 1818, under the command of William Wilkinson. The Chileans purchased her for 210,000 pesos, renamed her San Martín, and armed her with 64 guns. Wilkinson remained her captain.

On 25 October 1818 the First Chilean Navy Squadron, commanded by Manuel Blanco Encalada and comprising San Martín, Lautaro, and Chacabuco, defeated a Spanish expedition. The squadron captured the Santa Isabel, and eight other Spanish transports. One transport with 100 Spanish soldiers reached safety at Callao.

San Martín participated in the Freedom Expedition of Perú, which was under the command of Captain Lord Thomas Cochrane. Cochrane's flagship was the frigate O'Higgins. San Martín was still under Wilkinson's command.

== Fate ==
In July 1821 she was wrecked in the bay of Chorrilos, Peru. A report from Santiago, Chile, dated 13 August, reported that San Martín, Lord Cochrane's flagship, had been wrecked. The crew was saved, but she had been carrying the "Impost levied on the Extremedeos" and only a little of the silver had been saved. Cochrane shifted his flag to O'Higgins.
