= Dorsetshire (1800 EIC ship) =

History

Great Britain
- Name: Dorsetshire
- Namesake: Dorset
- Owner: Robert Williams
- Builder: Barnard, Deptford
- Launched: 1 March 1800
- Fate: Broken up c.1827

General characteristics
- Type: East Indiaman
- Tons burthen: 1201, 12016/94, or 1260, or 1268 (bm)
- Length: Overall:165 ft 1 1/2 in (50.3 m); Keel:133 ft 11 in (40.8 m)
- Beam: 41 ft 0 3/4 in (12.5 m)
- Depth of hold: 17 ft 0 in (5.2 m)
- Sail plan: Full-rigged ship
- Complement: 1800:100; 1804:140
- Armament: 1800:32 × 12&6-pounder guns; 1804:32 × 12&6-pounder guns
- Notes: Three decks

Dorsetshire was launched in 1800 as an East Indiaman. She made nine voyages for the British East India Company (EIC). In each of her first, second, and third voyages she was involved in a notable action. The remainder of her voyages appear to have proceeded without incident. She ceased sailing for the EIC in 1823 and was broken up c.1827.

== Career ==
=== EIC voyage #1 (1800–1801) ===
Captain John Ramsden acquired a letter of marque on 24 March 1800. He sailed from Torbay on 27 May 1800, bound for China.

Dorsetshire was part of a convoy that also included Exeter, Bombay Castle, Coutts, and Neptune, the Botany Bay ships Royal Admiral and Anne, and the whaler Seringapatam. Their escort was the small ship of the line HMS Belliqueux.

On the morning of 4 August they encountered French squadron consisting of the frigates Concorde, Médée, and Franchise. The French commander was concerned that he had encountered a fleet of powerful warships so he turned to escape. The British commander, Captain Rowley Bulteel, immediately ordered a pursuit. To preserve the impression of warships he also ordered four of his most powerful East Indiamen to join the chase. First Belliqueux captured Concorde. Exeter and Bombay Castle set out after Médée and succeeded in coming up with her after dark and tricking her into surrendering to what Médée thought was a ship of the line.

Dorsetshire reached Rio de Janeiro on 12 August and arrived at Whampoa anchorage on 21 February 1801.

Homeward bound, she crossed the Second Bar on 7 May Second Bar. She reached St Helena on 21 September and arrived at Long Reach on 7 December.

=== EIC voyage #2 (1803–1804) ===
Captain Robert Hunter Brown acquired a letter of marque on 3 September 1803. He sailed from The Downs on 27 April 1803, bound for China. Dorsetshire arrived at Whampoa on 3 September. She was at the Second Bar on 25 November, but did not leave China until 6 February 1804.

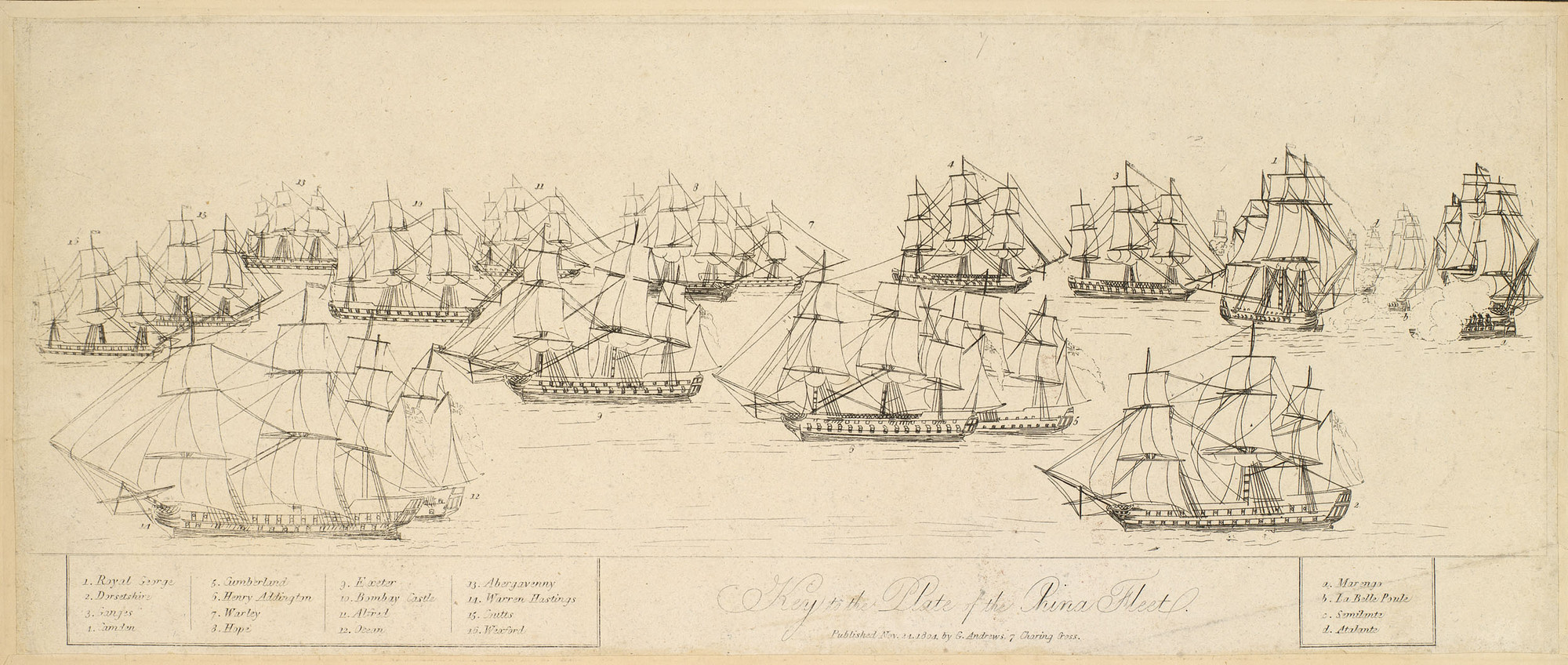
Dorsetshire can be seen in this printed key for a view of the Battle, showing the China Fleet a painting by Francis Sartorius, the younger after a drawing by an officer on board the Henry Addington

She was part of a convoy of returning East Indiamen and other vessels, all under the command of Captain Nathaniel Dance. The Royal Navy was unable to provide an escort and the captains of the EIC's China Fleet debated about setting out for home. Still, the China Fleet was at the Second Bar on 31 January 1804 and left China on 6 February.

As they were passing through the Straits of Malacca on 14 February, they encountered a French squadron under Rear-Admiral the Comte de Linois.

Dance sent the brig Ganges and three Indiamen to approach the strange vessels and investigate. It quickly became clear that the strange vessels were enemy warships.

Dance ordered his fleet to form a line of battle, while creating a bluff that four of his Indiamen were a squadron of ships of the line escorting the convoy. A skirmish ensued with the result that Linois, somewhat inexplicably, withdrew.

On 18 February the Indiamen were at Malacca. On 28 February, the British ships of the line HMS Sceptre and Albion joined the Fleet in the Strait and conducted them safely to St Helena.

Dorsetshire was at Penang on 1 March, reached St Helena on 9 June, and arrived at Long Reach on 14 August.

=== EIC voyage #3 (1805–1806) ===
Captain Brown sailed from Portsmouth on 25 April 1805, bound for Madras, Bengal, and China.

On 7 August 1805, HMS Blenheim, Captain Austin Bissell and Rear-Admiral Thomas Troubridge, was escorting a fleet of East Indiamen consisting of Castle Eden, Cumberland, Devonshire, Dorsetshire, Exeter, Hope, and Preston. They were at 19°3′S 17°15′E when they encountered the French ship of the line Marengo and frigate Belle Poule. There was a brief exchange of fire before both sides sailed on. Troubridge reprimanded the captains of Cumberland and Preston for having acted aggressively.

Dorsetshire reached Madras on 23 August and Saugor on 16 September. She sailed on, reaching Penang on 13 November and Malacca on 2 December, and arriving at Whampoa on 1 February 1806. Homeward bound, she crossed the Second Bar on 17 March, reached St Helena on 12 August, and arrived at Long Reach on 3 November.

=== EIC voyage #4 (1808–1809) ===
Captain Brown sailed from Portsmouth on 5 March 1808, bound for Madras and China. Dorsetshire was at the Cape of Good Hope on 31 May, reached Madras on 5 August, and arrived at Whampoa on 4 October. Homeward bound, she crossed the Second Bar on 3 February 1809, was at Penang on 31 March, reached St Helena on 10 July, and arrived at Long Reach on 14 September.

=== EIC voyage #5 (1811–1812) ===
Captain Brown sailed from Torbay on 12 May 1811, bound for Bombay and China. Dorsetshire reached Bombay on 5 September and Batavia on 22 December; she arrived at Whampoa on 8 March 1812. Homeward bound, she crossed the Second Bar on 29 March and reached St Helena on 23 July. In September Lord Eldon, Dorsetshire, Scaleby Castle, Batavia, and Cornwall were at 14°8′N 28°11′W on their way from St Helena to England and under escort by HMS Loire. She arrived at Long Reach on 25 October.

=== EIC voyage #6 (1814–1815) ===
Captain Nathaniel Turner sailed from Portsmouth on 9 April 1814, bound for China. Dorsetshire arrived at Whampoa on 9 September. Homeward bound, she crossed the Second Bar on 27 December, reached St Helena on 17 April 1815, and arrived at Long Reach on 2 July.

=== EIC voyage #7 (1817–1818) ===
Capt Nathaniel Turner sailed from Portsmouth on 20 April 1817, bound for China. Dorsetshire arrived at Whampoa on 9 September. Homeward bound, she crossed the Second Bar on 26 October, reached St Helena on 20 February 1818, and arrived at Long Reach on 27 April.

=== EIC voyage #8 (1820–1821) ===
Captain Samuel Lyde sailed from The Downs on 15 March 1820, bound for St Helena and China. Dorsetshire reached St Helena on 18 May and arrived at Whampoa on 9 October. Homeward bound, she crossed the Second Bar on 2 February 1821, reached St Helena on 13 May, and arrived at Long Reach on 25 July. By one report Dorsetshire was sold as a storeship in 1821, but on 16 January 1822 the EIC engaged her for one more voyage as a "dismantled Regular Ship" at a rate of £14 10s per ton (bm).

=== EIC voyage #9 (1822–1823) ===
Captain Lyde sailed from The Downs on 12 June 1822, bound for Bengal. Dorsetshire arrived at the New Anchorage (on the Hooghly River), on 15 October. She left Bengal on 11 January 1823, reached St Helena on 7 March, and arrived at Gravesend on 3 May.

== Fate ==
In June 1827 Dorsetshire's register was cancelled as she had been broken up.
