= Exeter (1792 ship) =

History

British East India Company
- Name: Exeter
- Owner: Voyages #1-7:Richard Lewin; Voyage #8:Andrew Timbrell
- Builder: Perry, Blackwall
- Launched: 31 October 1792
- Fate: Sold for breaking up 1811

General characteristics
- Tons burthen: 1265, or 1,26588/94 (bm)
- Length: 165 ft 7 in (50.5 m) (overall), 133 ft 10 1/4 in (40.8 m) (keel)
- Beam: 42 ft 2 in (12.9 m)
- Depth of hold: 17 ft 0 in (5.2 m)
- Sail plan: Full-rigged ship
- Complement: (exclusive of lascars); Voyages #1-3:135 men; Voyages #4 & 5:110; Voyages #:130; Voyage #8: 135
- Armament: 1st Letter of marque: 26 × 12 & 6-pounder guns; 2nd Letter of marque: 26 × 12 & 9-pounder guns; 3rd Letter of marque: 26 × 12 & 9-pounder guns; 4th Letter of marque: 26 × 12 & 6-pounder guns; 5th Letter of marque: 32 × 12 & 18-pounder guns

Exeter was a three-decker East Indiaman built by Perry and launched in 1792. She made eight voyages to the East Indies for the East India Company (EIC). More unusually, on separate voyages she captured a French frigate and participated in the Battle of Pulo Aura. She was sold for breaking up in 1811.

== Career ==
East Indiamen traveled in convoys as much as they could. Frequently these convoys had as escorts vessels of the British Royal Navy, though generally not past India, or before on the return leg. Even so, the Indiamen were heavily armed so that they could dissuade Malay pirates and even large privateers. They were not designed, however, to fight naval ships as their ports were small and so the guns could only fire directly out. Furthermore, even the largest guns were smaller than those that naval vessels commonly carried. Still, from their appearance in the distance, or in the dark, it was possible to mistake them for ships of the line, as Exeter's own history proved.

Like many other East Indiamen during the French Revolutionary and Napoleonic Wars, Exeter sailed under letters of marque. This gave her the right to capture enemy vessels, civilian and military, even when not engaging in self-defense. For her first six voyages her principal managing owner was Richard Lewin, who was a former commander for the EIC and a member of the United Company of merchants of England trading to the East-Indies. For her last two it was Andrew Timbrell. He too was a former commander for the EIC.

=== First voyage (1793-1794) ===
Captain Lestock Wilson sailed Exeter on her first voyage, this to Bombay and China. She sailed under a letter of marque issued on 1 March 1793. and left Portsmouth on 5 April. She reached Bombay on 10 August, and Whampoa, an island lying 12 miles east of Canton, on 3 January 1794. On the return leg she crossed Second Bar on 15 February, reaching St Helena on 18 June and the Downs on 7 September. Wilson’s Chief Mate on this voyage and the two after it was Henry Meriton, who would go on to command Exeter on her fourth through seventh voyages.

=== Second voyage (1795-97) ===
Wilson sailed Exeter on her second voyage under a new letter of marque, this one dated 11 March 1795. Exeter left Portsmouth on 24 May for Bombay and China. On 6 July she was at St Salvadore). She had sailed with a convoy of Indiamen that were bringing General Alured Clarke and his troops for the invasion of the Cape Colony.

She sailed on 13 July, together with some other Indiamen, and under the escort of Sphinx. However, Sphinx ran into Warren Hastings and both vessels returned to port, Exeter accompanying them.

She and the fleet reached Simons Bay on 3 September. After she had delivered her troops Exeter reached Quilon on 21 December, and Bombay on 4 January 1796. From there she reached Malacca on 16 June and Whampoa on 6 July. She stayed there for quite some time and did not cross the Second Bar for her homeward bound journey until 1 January 1797. From there she reached Penang on 27 January, Cape Town on 4 April, St Helena on 28 April, and the Downs on 24 July.

=== Third voyage (1798-99) ===
Captain Lestock Wilson left Portsmouth on 17 February 1798 and arrived back on 1 August 1799, having reached Bombay and China.

=== Fourth voyage (1800-01) ===
For her fourth voyage, Exeter was under the command of Captain Henry Meriton, and sailing under a letter of marque issued 24 March 1800. It was this voyage that gave Meriton his order of rank in the East India Company. His rank as commander dated from 16 October 1799, when he was given command of Exeter.

Exeter left Torbay on 27 May, sailing via the South Atlantic. She was in a convoy with a number of other vessels, particularly the East Indiamen Bombay Castle, Coutts, and Neptune, and under the escort of the 64-gun ship of the line Belliqueux. On 4 August the convoy was near the island of Trindade off the Brazilian coast, from where they would catch the westerly trade winds that would carry them to Cape of Good Hope. There they encountered a French frigate squadron under the command of Jean-François Landolphe, and consisting of the frigates Concorde, Médée, and Franchise.

When the British formed a line of battle, Landolphe thought from the distance that they were a fleet of powerful warships and turned to escape. Belliqueux captured Landolphe’s Concorde. Two East Indiamen set out in pursuit of the other two frigates, with Exeter and Bombay Castle chasing Médée. As darkness fell, Exeter caught up with Médée and Meriton had lights displayed throughout his ship and behind the gun ports to give the impression that she was a ship of the line. Exeter fired a broadside; Bombay Castle possibly did so also. (Note: There is some discrepancy in accounts as to whether Exeter fired at all, whether Bombay Castle was in sight but distant, or whether she actually engaged Médée.) Believing himself outgunned, Captain Jean-Daniel Coudin surrendered Médée, only to discover when he came aboard Exeter that she was a merchant vessel. Horrified, he demanded to be allowed to return to his ship to continue the fight, but Meriton declined the demand.

Exeter reached Rio de Janeiro on 12 August. From there she sailed to China, arriving at Whampoa on 19 February 1801. On her return trip she crossed Second Bar on 28 March. She reached St Helena on 21 September and the Downs on 3 December.

The captured frigates reached England towards the end of the French Revolutionary Wars and the Royal Navy did not take Concorde into service. The Royal Navy did purchase Médée, which became HMS Medee, but she was never commissioned and instead served as a prison hulk from 1802 until she was sold in 1805. Belliqueux, Exeter, Bombay Castle, Coutts, Dorsetshire, and Neptune shared in the prize money for Concorde and Médée.

=== Fifth voyage (1803-04) ===
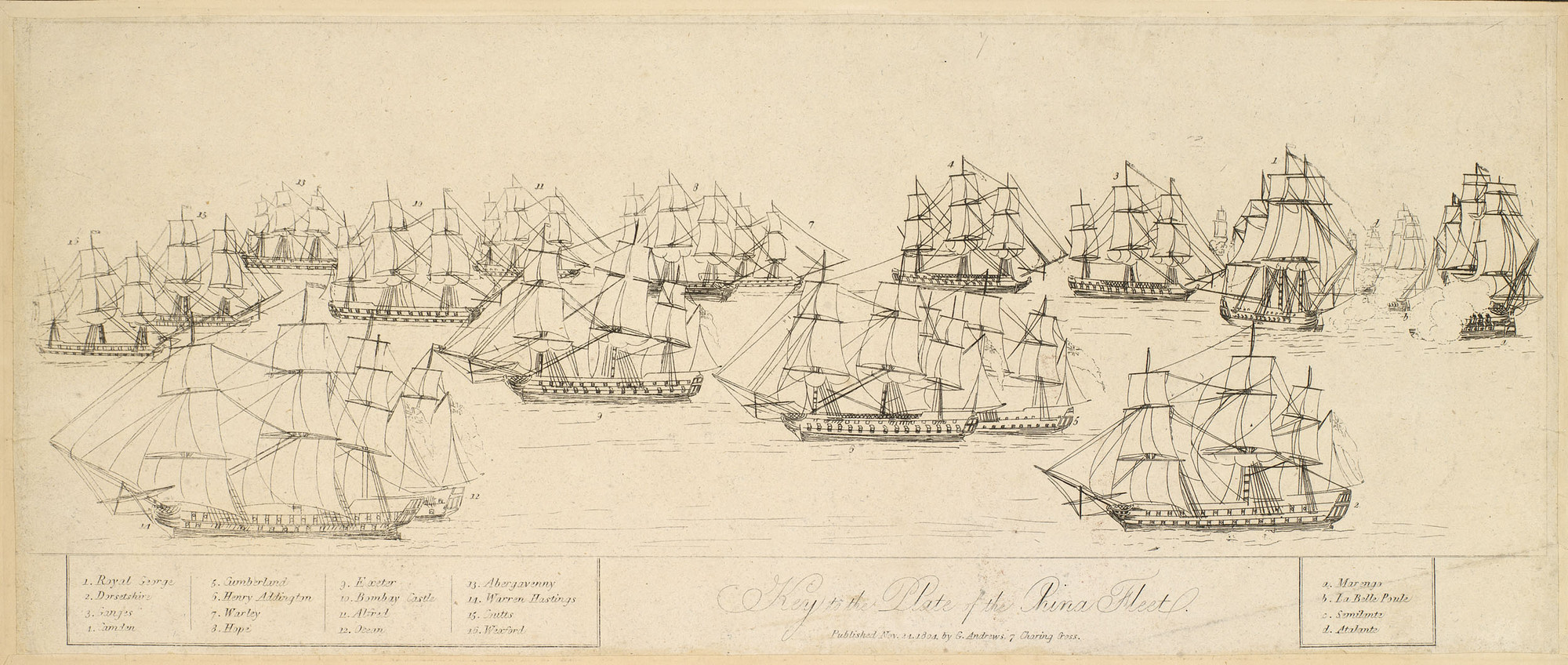
Exeter can be seen in this printed key for a view of the Battle, showing the China Fleet a painting by Francis Sartorius, the younger after a drawing by an officer on board the Henry Addington

Exeter's fifth voyage was to China and Meriton remained her captain. The Treaty of Amiens collapsed and the Napoleonic Wars broke out after she had left the Downs on 6 April 1803 so her letter of marque was dated 20 June. She reached Penang on 3 August, Malacca 15 days later, and Whampoa, on 9 September. On the return leg, she crossed Second Bar on 12 November.

On 14 February 1804 Exeter was involved in the battle of Pulo Aura, though she herself did not engage in any exchange of fire. She, and the rest of the convoy, reached Malacca on 18 February, and Penang on 1 March. From there she sailed to St Helena, which she reached on 9 June. She finally arrived at the Downs on 8 August. On the fleet’s safe return, the EIC voted rewards to all the officers and seamen involved in the battle. The 12 captains whose vessels did not engage in combat, including Meriton, each received a reward of 500 guineas and a piece of plate worth 50 guineas. The Lloyd's Patriotic Fund gave each captain a sword worth 50 guineas, and one worth 100 guineas to Captain Nathaniel Dance, who had been the commodore of the fleet.

=== Sixth voyage (1805-06) ===
Next, Meriton sailed Exeter on her sixth voyage, which again took her to China. She left Portsmouth on 25 April 1805.

On 7 August 1805, HMS Blenheim, Captain Austin Bissell and Rear-Admiral Thomas Troubridge, was escorting a fleet of East Indiamen consisting of Castle Eden, Cumberland, Devonshire, Dorsetshire, Exeter, Hope, and Preston. They were at 19°3′S 17°15′E when they encountered the French ship of the line Marengo and frigate Belle Poule. There was a brief exchange of fire before both sides sailed on. Troubridge reprimanded the captains of Cumberland and Preston for having acted too boldly in exchanging fire with the French.

Exeter reached Madras on 23 August. She sailed on to Penang (18 September), Malacca (22 October), and Whampoa (23 December). For the return trip she crossed Second Bar on 3 February 1806, reached Malacca on 17 March, St Helena on 7 July, and the Downs on 3 September.

=== Seventh voyage (1808-09) ===
Meriton and Exeter left Portsmouth on 5 March 1808, for China. She reached Madras on 3 August, and reaching Penang on 21 August. A few days later, on 5 September she was at Malacca, and a month later, on 4 October she reached Whampoa. On her return journey she crossed Second Bar on 2 February 1809 and reached England by 13 September.

After this voyage Meriton would go on to make several others for the EIC in different ships, with the result that in all he would hold the record of 12 voyages for the company.

=== Eighth voyage (1810-11) ===
For her eighth voyage Exeter was under the command of Captain James Timbrell, who would sail her to Bombay and back. Her letter of marque was dated 3 May 1810, and she left Portsmouth on 11 May. She reached Madeira 16 days later. She finally arrived at Bombay on 17 September. For the return voyage she passed the Point de Galle on 25 February 1811, reaching St Helena on 28 May, and anchoring in the Downs on 9 August.

== Fate ==
Exeter was sold in 1811 for breaking up.
