= Preston (1798 EIC ship) =

Great Britain
- Name: Preston
- Owner: EIC voyages 1-2: William Hamilton; EIC voyages 3-4: Henry Callender; EIC voyages 5-6: Miss Jane Chrystie
- Builder: Frances Barnard, Son & Roberts, Deptford
- Launched: 10 December 1798
- Fate: Foundered c.August 1815

General characteristics
- Tons burthen: 671, or 671 67/94 or 711, (bm)
- Length: Overall:138 ft 1 1/2 in (42.1 m); Keel:112 ft 3 in (34.2 m)
- Beam: 33 ft 6 1/2 in (10.2 m)
- Depth of hold: 13 ft 9 in (4.2 m)
- Complement: 1799:60; 1803:90
- Armament: 1799:20 × 12-pounder guns + 6 swivel guns; 1803:26 × 12-pounder guns; 1815:10 × 18-pounder carronades
- Notes: Three decks

Preston was launched in 1798 as an East Indiaman. She made six voyages for the British East India Company (EIC), between 1805 and 1819. In 1810 and 1811 she participated as a transport in two British military campaigns. She was sold for breaking up in 1812 but instead became a transport and a West Indiaman. She disappeared after a gale in August 1815.

== EIC career ==
=== EIC voyage #1 (1799-1800) ===
Captain Thomas Garland Murray acquired a letter of marque on 26 January 1799. He sailed from Portsmouth on 2 April 1799, bound for Madras and Bengal. Preston reached Madras on 3 August and arrived at Diamond Harbour on 23 August. Homeward bound, she was at Saugor on 19 November. She reached Madras on 20 December, Colombo on 11 January 1800, Point de Galle on 6 February, and St Helena on 27 April. She arrived at The Downs on 5 July.

=== EIC voyage #2 (1801-1802) ===
Captain Murray sailed from Portsmouth on 23 April 1801, bound for Madras, Bengal, and Bencoolen. Preston was at Madeira on 9 May and St Augustine's Bay on 3 August. She reached Madras on 16 September and arrived at Diamond Harbour on 13 October. Homeward bound, she was at Saugor on 15 December and Bencoolen on 24 February 1802. She reached St Helena on 25 June and The Downs on 31 August.

=== EIC voyage #3 (1803-1804) ===
Captain Henry Sturrock acquired a letter of marque on 16 July 1803. He sailed from The Downs 27 April 1803, bound for Madras, Bengal, and Bencoolen. Preston reached Madras on 19 August and arrived at Diamond Harbour on 26 August and Kedgeree on 19 September.

For a period Preston served as a guardship at Kedgeree.

Homeward bound, Preston was at Saugor on 2 April 1804, Bencoolen on 17 May, and St Helena on 14 August. She arrived at The Downs on 9 November.

=== EIC voyage #4 (1805-1807) ===
Captain Sturrock sailed from Portsmouth on 25 April 1805, bound for Madras, Bengal, and Bombay.

On 7 August 1805, HMS Blenheim, Captain Austin Bissell and Rear-Admiral Thomas Troubridge, was escorting a fleet of East Indiamen consisting of Castle Eden, Cumberland, Devonshire, Dorsetshire, Exeter, Ganges, Hope, and Preston. They were at 19°3′S 17°15′E when they encountered the French ship of the line Marengo and frigate Belle Poule. There was a brief exchange of fire before both sides sailed on. Troubridge reprimanded the captains of Cumberland and Preston for having acted too boldly in exchanging fire with the French.

Preston reached Madras on 23 August and arrived at Diamond Harbour on 11 September. She was at Saugor on 31 October. She then sailed to Colombo, which she reached on 20 December, Cochin on 3 January 1806, and Bombay on 18 January. She returned to Diamond Harbour on 31 March. Homeward bound she was at Saugor at 30 July. She reached Madras on 7 October and Trincomalee on 18 October. She reached the Cape of Good Hope 30 December and St Helena on 23 January 1807. She arrived at The Downs on 12 April.

=== EIC voyage #5 (1808-1809) ===
Captain Sturrock sailed from Portsmouth on 5 March 1808, bound for Madras and Bengal. Preston reached the Cape on 31 May and Madras on 3 August. She arrived at Diamond Harbour on 12 August.

Preston was at Saugor on 28 August. Homeward bound, she was at Madras on 16 October. She then joined a convoy that departed Madras on 25 October. HMS Albion provided the escort for the nine East Indiamen of the convoy. A gale commenced around 20 November at 10°S 90°E and by 22 November had dispersed the fleet. By 21 February 1809 three of the Indiamen — Lord Nelson, Glory, and Experiment had not arrived at Cape Town. Apparently all three had foundered without a trace.

Preston was at the Cape on 19 January 1809, reached St Helena on 24 February, and arrived at The Downs on 23 May.

The Court of Directors of the EIC held an inquiry on this and another loss the next year. Phoenix was the last to see the missing vessels and all the captains of the surviving ships agreed that the missing vessels must have foundered from the violence of the hurricane.

=== EIC voyage #6 (1810-1812) ===
Captain Sturrock sailed from Portsmouth on 13 April 1810. Preston was at São Tiago on 23 May and arrived at Madras on 28 August. There the British government hired her as a transport for the Île de France (Mauritius). Preston was at Rodrigues on 6 November, and Mauritius on 29 November. The invasion took place on 3 December.

By 10 February Preston was back at 1811 Diamond Harbour. There the government again hired her, this time for the invasion of Java.

Preston was at Saugor on 15 February and Malacca on 6 May. Preston was in the 4th division, which left Malacca on 17 June. She was at Batavia by 8 August. She was back at Diamond Harbour on 22 October and Calcutta on 15 November. Homeward bound, she was at Saugor on 11 January 1812 and Colombo on 19 February. She reached St Helena on 4 May and arrived at The Downs on 4 August.

=== Transport ===
One source states that on her return in 1812 Preston was sold for breaking up. However, in actuality she appeared in Lloyd's Register (LR) with Hewland, master, Murray & Co., owners, and trade London transport.

Year	Master	Owner	Trade	Source
1815	D.Grierson	Murray & Co.	London–Jamaica	LR

On 2 August 1815 as Preston was sailing from Jamaica to London in a convoy she encountered a gale that cost her her main and mizzen masts. A later report stated that Preston, under master Grierson, had been seen since the gale. The last report concerning the convoy of which Preston was part of was that Preston was one of eight missing.

== Fate ==
Preston was never heard from again and was no longer listed in the 1816 Lloyd's Register.

== See also ==
- List of people who disappeared mysteriously at sea
