= Devonshire (1804 EIC ship) =

History

United Kingdom
- Name: Devonshire
- Namesake: Devon
- Owner: EIC voyage #1: Henry Cooke; EIC voyage #2: James Thomas; EIC voyage #3:Thomas Stalker; EIC voyages #4-5:Daniel Stalker
- Builder: Pitcher, Northfleet
- Launched: 18 December 1804
- Fate: Foundered 1814

General characteristics
- Tons burthen: 820, 8214/94, or 840 (bm)
- Length: 146 ft 1 in (44.5 m) (overall); 118 ft 7 in (36.1 m) (keel)
- Beam: 36 ft 1 in (11.0 m)
- Depth of hold: 14 ft 9 in (4.5 m)
- Propulsion: Sail
- Complement: 100
- Armament: 30 × 18-pounder guns
- Notes: Three decks

Devonshire was launched in 1804 as an East Indiaman. She made four voyages for the British East India Company (EIC), and was wrecked on her fifth while still outward bound.

== EIC voyages ==
During the Peace of Amiens, the EIC contracted with Thomas Hurry, Esq., that Devonshire, then building would carry out six voyages for them. They contracted a peacetime freight of £18 3s per ton (with kintledge) or £16 15s per ton (without kintledge).

=== EIC voyage #1 (1805–1806) ===
War with France had broken out by the time Devonshire had been launched and was ready to sail. Captain James Murray acquired a letter of marque on 27 February 1805. On 25 April he sailed Devonshire from Portsmouth bound for Madras, Bengal, and Ceylon.

On 7 August, HMS Blenheim, Captain Austin Bissell and Rear-Admiral Thomas Troubridge, was escorting a fleet of East Indiamen consisting of Castle Eden, Cumberland, Devonshire, Dorsetshire, Exeter, Ganges, Hope, and Preston. They were at 19°3′S 17°15′E when they encountered the French ship of the line Marengo and frigate Belle Poule. There was a brief exchange of fire before both sides sailed on. Troubridge reprimanded the captains of Cumberland and Preston for having acted too boldly in exchanging fire with the French.

Devonshire reached Madras on 23 August and arrived at Diamond Harbour on 11 September. Homeward bound, she was at Saugor on 23 December. She then proceeded to stop at a number of ports on India's west coast. She was at Vizagapatam on 29 December, Coninga on 3 January 1806, at Narsipore on 12 January, and Madras again on 15 January. She was at Colombo on 21 February and Point de Galle on 5 March, reached St Helena on 14 May, and arrived at Long Reach on 27 July.

=== EIC voyage #2 (1807–1808) ===
Captain Murray sailed from Portsmouth on 18 April 1807, bound for Bombay and Ceylon. Devonshire reached Bombay on 1 September. She then cruised on India's east coat. She was at Goa on 27 October, Tellicherry on 4 November, Calicut on 12 November, and Quilon on 21 November. She returned to Bombay on 25 December. Homeward bound, she was at Colombo on 8 March 1808 and Point de Galle on 14 March. She reached St Helena on 11 June and arrived at Gravesend on 19 August.

=== EIC voyage #3 (1809–1810) ===
Captain Murray sailed from Portsmouth on 28 April, bound for Madras and Bengal. she was at Madeira on 8 May, reached Madras on 15 September, and arrived at Diamond Harbour on 22 October. Homeward bound she was at Saugor on 20 December and Madras on again on 4 February 1810. She was at Point de Galle on 17 February, reached St Helena on 3 May, and arrived at Long Reach on 7 July.

=== EIC voyage #4 (1811–1812) ===
Captain Murray sailed from Torbay on 12 May 1811, bound for Madras and Bengal. Devonshire reached Madras on 10 September and arrived at Diamond Harbour on 12 October. Homeward bound, she was at Saugor on 23 November, Vizagapatam on 8 January 1812, Coninga on 12 January, and Madras on 25 January. She reached St Helena on 11 May and arrived at Northfleet on 23 July.

== Fate ==
Captain Murray sailed from Portsmouth on 2 June 1813, bound for Bengal and China.

Devonshire was lost on 2 July 1814 in Saugor Roads with the loss of 29 lives, 16 of them European. By one account she struck an uncharted sandbank.

However, the Lloyd's List account and that of an eyewitness, an EIC captain, makes it clear that she was at anchor to take on a cargo for China. All her gunports were open and when a squall came up she heeled over. Before her crew could close her ports she took on so much water that she sank. Only her mast tops remained above water and her entire cargo was lost. The EIC valued its cargo lost on Devonshire at £26,988.
