= Castle Eden (1800 EIC ship) =

History

Great Britain
- Name: Castle Eden
- Namesake: Castle Eden
- Owner: EIC voyages #1–2: Rowland Webster; EIC voyages #3-5: John Rogers; EIC voyage #6: John Atkins
- Operator: British East India Company
- Builder: Pitcher, Northfleet
- Launched: 13 January 1800
- Fate: Became a transport in 1812

General characteristics
- Tons burthen: 818, or 81820/94, or 868 (bm)
- Length: Overall:145 ft 8 in (44.4 m); Keel:118 ft 1 3/4 in (36.0 m)
- Beam: 36 ft 1 in (11.0 m)
- Depth of hold: 14 ft 9 in (4.5 m)
- Sail plan: Full-rigged ship
- Complement: 1800:80; 1803:100; 1804:100
- Armament: 1800:26 × 12&18-pounder guns; 1803:26 × 12&18-pounder guns; 1805:26 × 12&18-pounder guns
- Notes: Three decks

Castle Eden was launched in 1800 as an East Indiaman. She made six voyages for the British East India Company (EIC) before she became a transport in 1812.

== Career ==
=== EIC voyage #1 (1800–1801) ===
Captain Alexander Cuming (or Cumine) acquired a letter of marque on 28 March 1800. He sailed from Torbay on 27 May, bound for Bengal and Madras. Castle Eden arrived at Kedgeree on 6 December. She was at Saugor on 8 February 1801, and reached Madras on 10 March. Homeward bound, she was at Vizagapatam on 30 March and the Cape of Good Hope on 11 July. She reached St Helena on 15 August and arrived at The Downs on 31 October.

=== EIC voyage #2 (1802–1804) ===
Captain Cuming sailed from The Downs on 13 October 1802, bound for the Cape and Madras. Castle Eden reached the Cape on 22 December and arrived at Madras on 16 April 1803. Captain Cuming received a letter of marque on 16 July 1803. Homeward bound, Castle Eden reached St Helena on 27 November and arrived at The Downs on 5 March 1804.

=== EIC voyage #3 (1805–1806) ===
Captain Richard Colnett acquired a letter of marque on 15 February 1805. He sailed from Portsmouth on 25 April, bound for Madras, Bengal, and Bencoolen.

On 7 August 1805, HMS Blenheim, Captain Austin Bissell and Rear-Admiral Thomas Troubridge, was escorting a fleet of East Indiamen consisting of Castle Eden, Cumberland, Devonshire, Dorsetshire, Exeter, Ganges, Hope, and Preston. They were at 19°3′S 17°15′E when they encountered the French ship of the line Marengo and frigate Belle Poule. There was a brief exchange of fire before both sides sailed on. Troubridge reprimanded the captains of Cumberland and Preston for having acted too boldly in exchanging fire with the French.

Castle Eden reached Madras on 23 August and arrived at Diamond Harbour on 11 September. She was at Saugor on 7 November, and reached Bencoolen on 23 December. Homeward bound, she reached St Helena on 10 April 1806, and arrived at Upper Hope on 16 June. (Note: Upper Hope was on the River Thames opposite Clewer Point, a little way upriver from Windsor, Berkshire.)

=== EIC voyage #4 (1807–1808) ===
Captain Colnett sailed from Portsmouth on 26 February 1807, bound for Madras and Bengal. Castle Eden reached Madras on 3 July and arrived at Diamond Harbour on 31 July. She was at Kidderpore on 22 August and Saugor on 29 November. Homeward bound, she was at Point de Galle on 7 March 1808, reached St Helena on 11 June, and arrived at Long Reach on 18 August.

=== EIC voyage #5 (1809–1810) ===
Captain Colnett sailed from Portsmouth on 28 April 1809, bound for Madras and Bengal. Castle Eden was at Madeira on 9 May, reached Madras on 15 September, and arrived at Diamond Harbour on 23 October. Homeward bound, she was at Saugor on 4 December, Vizagapatam on 31 December, Coninga on 5 January 1810, Masulipatam on 9 January, and Madras on 13 January. She was at Colombo on 3 February, reached St Helena on 3 May, and arrived at Long Reach on 9 July.

The celebrated memoirist William Hickey, who had served the EIC in Bengal since 1783, arrived home on his retirement on this voyage. His memoirs provide a detailed account of the voyage.

=== EIC voyage #6 (1811–1812) ===
Captain Colnett sailed from Portsmouth on 12 March 1811, bound for Madras and Bengal. Castle Eden reached Madras on 27 July and arrived at Diamond Harbour on 15 August. Homeward bound, she was at Saugor on 23 October, reached St Helena on 4 March 1812, and arrived at The Downs on 14 May.

== Fate ==
In 1812 Castle Eden was hired out as a transport.
