= HMS Blenheim (1761) =

Royal Navy ship of the line

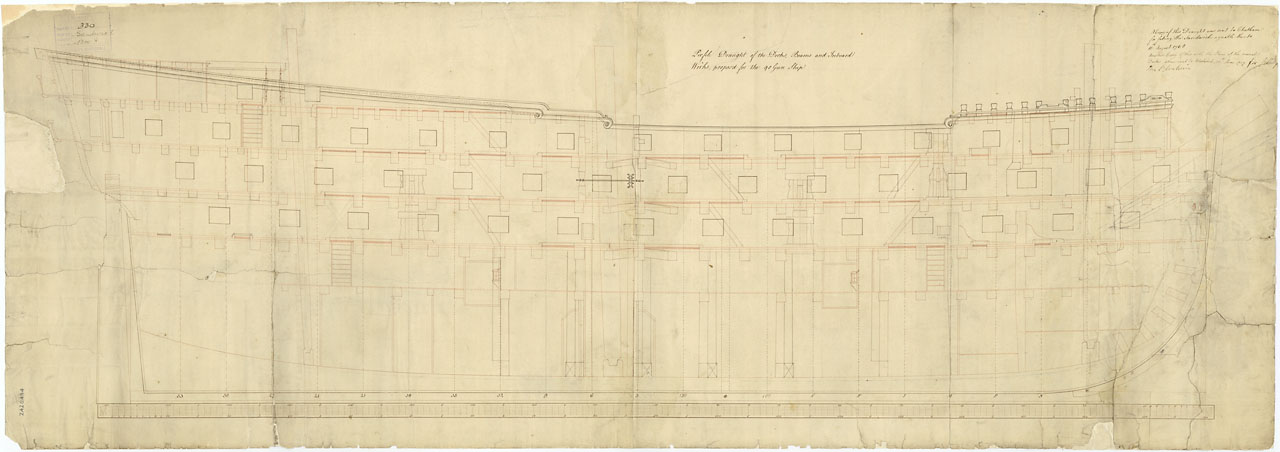
- Blenheim

History

Great Britain
- Name: HMS Blenheim
- Ordered: 12 November 1755
- Builder: Woolwich Dockyard
- Launched: 5 July 1761
- Commissioned: August 1761
- Honours and awards: Naval General Service Medal with clasp "St Vincent"
- Fate: Foundered, 1807

General characteristics
- Class & type: Sandwich-class ship of the line
- Tons burthen: 1,827 (bm)
- Length: 176 ft 1 in (53.67 m) (gundeck); 142 ft 7 in (43.46 m) (keel)
- Beam: 49 ft 1 in (14.96 m)
- Depth of hold: 21 ft (6.4 m)
- Propulsion: Sails
- Sail plan: Full-rigged ship
- Armament: originally 90 guns: Gundeck: 28 × 32-pounder guns; Middle gundeck: 30 × 18-guns; Upper gundeck: 30 × 12-guns; Fc: 2 × 9-pounderguns; 1801: reduced to a 74-gun Third Rate

HMS Blenheim was a 90-gun second-rate ship of the line of the Royal Navy, built by Israel Pownoll and launched on 5 July 1761 at Woolwich. In 1797 she participated in the Battle of Cape St Vincent. In 1801 Blenheim was razeed to a third rate. She disappeared off Madagascar with all hands in February 1807. Her fate remains a mystery.

== Service ==
Blenheim was first ordered to be built in November 1755 as part of an Admiralty program to expand the Royal Navy fleet ahead of the onset of the Seven Years' War with France. Construction was assigned to the Navy dockyard at Woolwich with an intended completion date of September 1759. However there were major delays arising from a lack of skilled workmen in the yard, and by Navy Board attempts to reduce waste and misuse in dockyard practices. In April 1757 Blenheim's shipwrights walked out in protest against a Navy Board reform that impacted on their traditional entitlement to remove spare timbers for personal use. Construction had fallen further behind schedule by the time they returned to work, with Blenheim not finally completed until July 1761.

The newly built vessel was commissioned into the Royal Navy in August 1761, for the final year of the Seven Years' War, but paid off in June 1762. She was recommissioned in March 1777 under Captain Broderick Hartwell, but paid off again in September 1784.

She was recommissioned for her third war in August 1794 under Captain Charles Calmady. Under the command of John Bazely from December 1794, she took part in the Battle of Hyères Islands in 1795. Blenheim then fought at the Battle of Cape St Vincent in 1797. By 1801, this by now 40-year-old ship had become so badly hogged as to be unsafe for sea. However, she was razeed to a 74-gun Third Rate in 1801–1802, and set sail for Barbados under the command of Captain Peter Bover at the end of the year, carrying Captain Samuel Hood and other commissioners to Trinidad.

On 14 November 1803 the French privateer Harmonie entered the harbour at Le Marin, together with a prize that she had taken. Captain Thomas Graves, in Blenheim, determined to cut her out. He beat around Diamond Rock but was not able to get into position until the 16th. He then decided to put 60 seamen in four boats, and 60 marines into another four. The seamen were to go into the harbour to cut out Harmonie, while the marines were to attack a battery of nine guns at Fort Dunkirk on the starboard side of the bay to block French reinforcements from massing there. Drake arrived on the scene and Graves had Captain William Ferris lead the seamen in the attack, together with 16 men from her. Drake towed the cutting out party, whilst the hired armed cutter Swift towed the marines. The two parties set out at 11p.m., and at 3a.m. the two attacks succeeded. The marines captured the fort, which was only guarded by 15 men, who they took prisoner. They spiked six 24-pounder guns and three 18-pounders, and blew up the magazine. The cutting out party met with resistance from Harmonie and suffered the only British casualties. Harmonie, of eight guns, had had a crew of 66 men under the command of Citizen Noyer at the start of the British attack. Some 12 escaped overboard and some may have drowned. Two were killed and 14 wounded. Blenheim had one man killed and two wounded, and Drake had three wounded, one dangerously so. The inhabitants of Grenada purchased and donated Harmonie to the Royal Navy, which named her HMS Grenada.

Captain Loftus Bland sailed Blenheim back to Portsmouth in 1804.

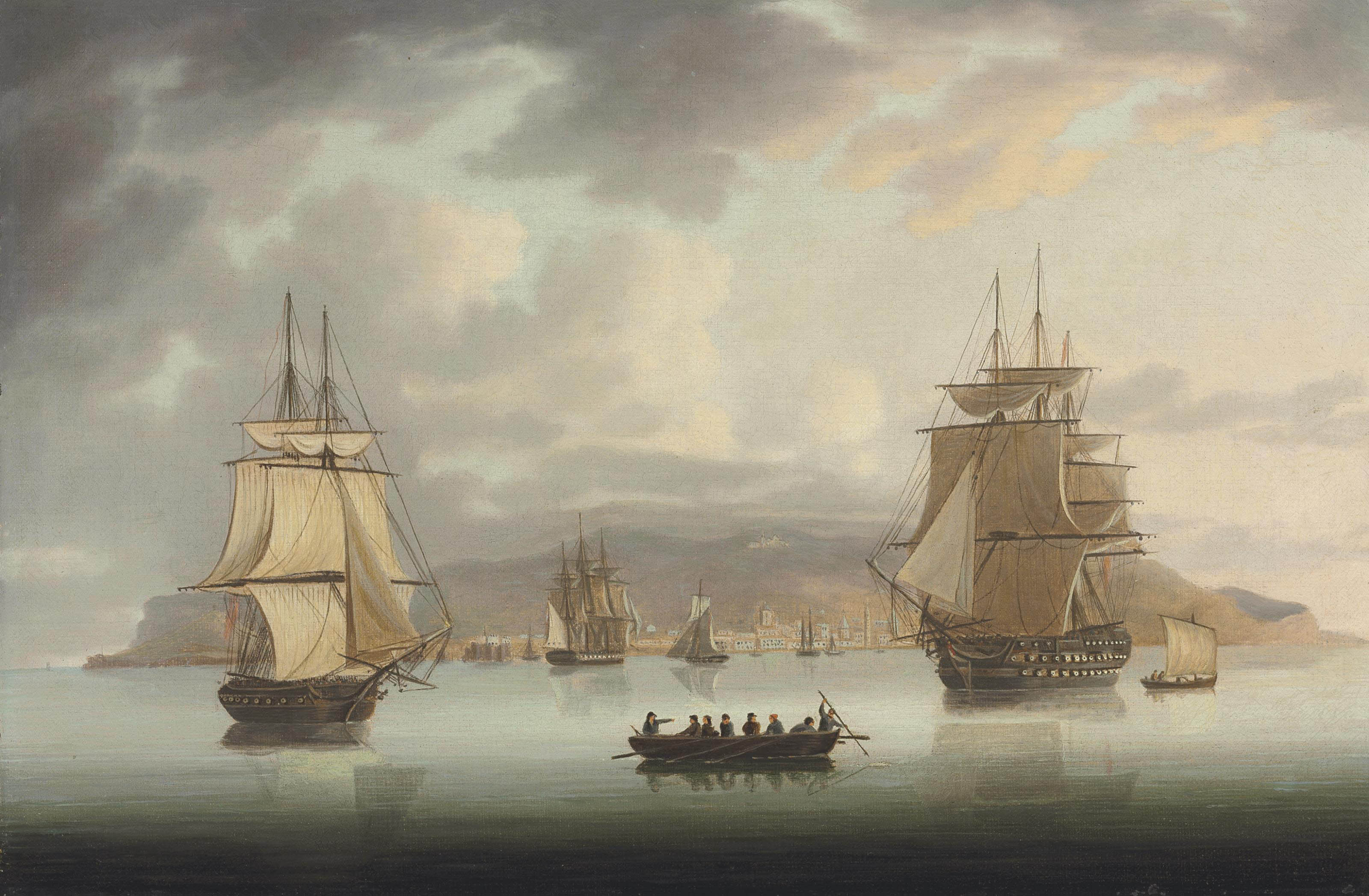
Funchal roadstead, Blenheim with Greyhound and Harrier outward bound, 1805. Thomas Buttersworth

In 1805, Blenheim sailed for Madras under the command of Captain Austin Bissell, as the flagship of Rear-Admiral Sir Thomas Troubridge, Bt.

On 7 August 1805, Blenheim was escorting a fleet of East Indiamen consisting of Castle Eden, Cumberland, Devonshire, Dorsetshire, Exeter, Hope, and Preston. They were at 19°3′S 17°15′E when they encountered the French ship of the line Marengo and frigate Belle Poule. There was a brief exchange of fire before both sides sailed on. Troubridge reprimanded the captains of Cumberland and Preston for having acted too boldly in exchanging fire with the French. She ran aground in the Strait of Malacca on 15 April 1806. She was refloated on 19 April having thrown all her guns overboard.

By the time Troubridge received orders to take command at the Cape of Good Hope, at the beginning of 1807, Blenheim was in alarming condition, and required constant pumping to keep her afloat. Despite the request of the Commander-in-Chief, East Indies, Edward Pellew, that he transfer his flag to another ship, Troubridge determined to take her to the Cape. Bissell also warned Troubridge of Blenheim's condition, but received in return the taunt that he might go ashore if he liked. Unable to shake Troubridge's confidence, Bissell composed a last letter to his wife before sailing, convinced the ship would founder.

== Loss ==
Blenheim left Madras on 12 January 1807, in the company of the sloop HMS Harrier (Capt. Justice Finley) and the frigate HMS Java (Capt. George Pigot), the latter recently captured from the Dutch. The two parted company from Harrier in a gale on 5 February 1807. When Harrier last saw them at 22°44′S 66°11′E they were flying signals of distress.

The French frigate Sémillante later reported having seen Blenheim off Rodrigues in a gale on 18 February. Another frigate later reported in Calcutta that ships answering to the descriptions of Blenheim and Java had been seen in distress off Réunion after the gale, had put in for repairs at Île Sainte-Marie in February 1807 and had sailed again.

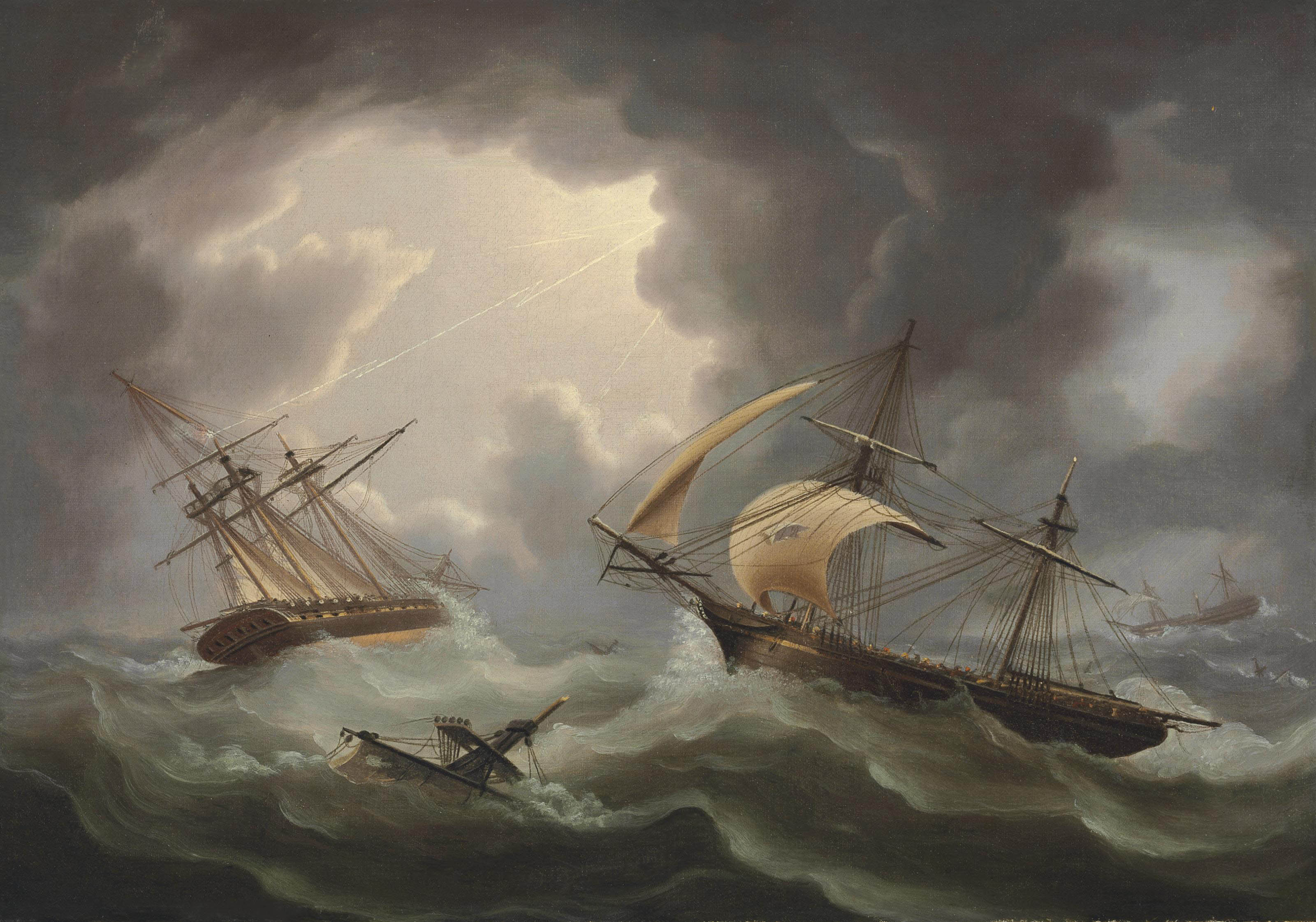
Loss of H.M. ship's Blenheim and Java in a hurricane off Rodriguez; the brig Harrier escaping, February 1807. Thomas Buttersworth

No further trace of the ships was ever found, despite an extensive search by Troubridge's son Captain Edward Troubridge in Greyhound and the co-operation of the French. Blenheim and Java are presumed to have foundered somewhere off Madagascar. There is speculation that Java was lost while trying to rescue crew from the sinking Blenheim.

About 280 men were lost aboard Java and 590 aboard Blenheim.
