= Sir Thomas Troubridge, 1st Baronet =

Royal Navy officer (1757–1807)

Rear-Admiral Sir Thomas Troubridge Bt
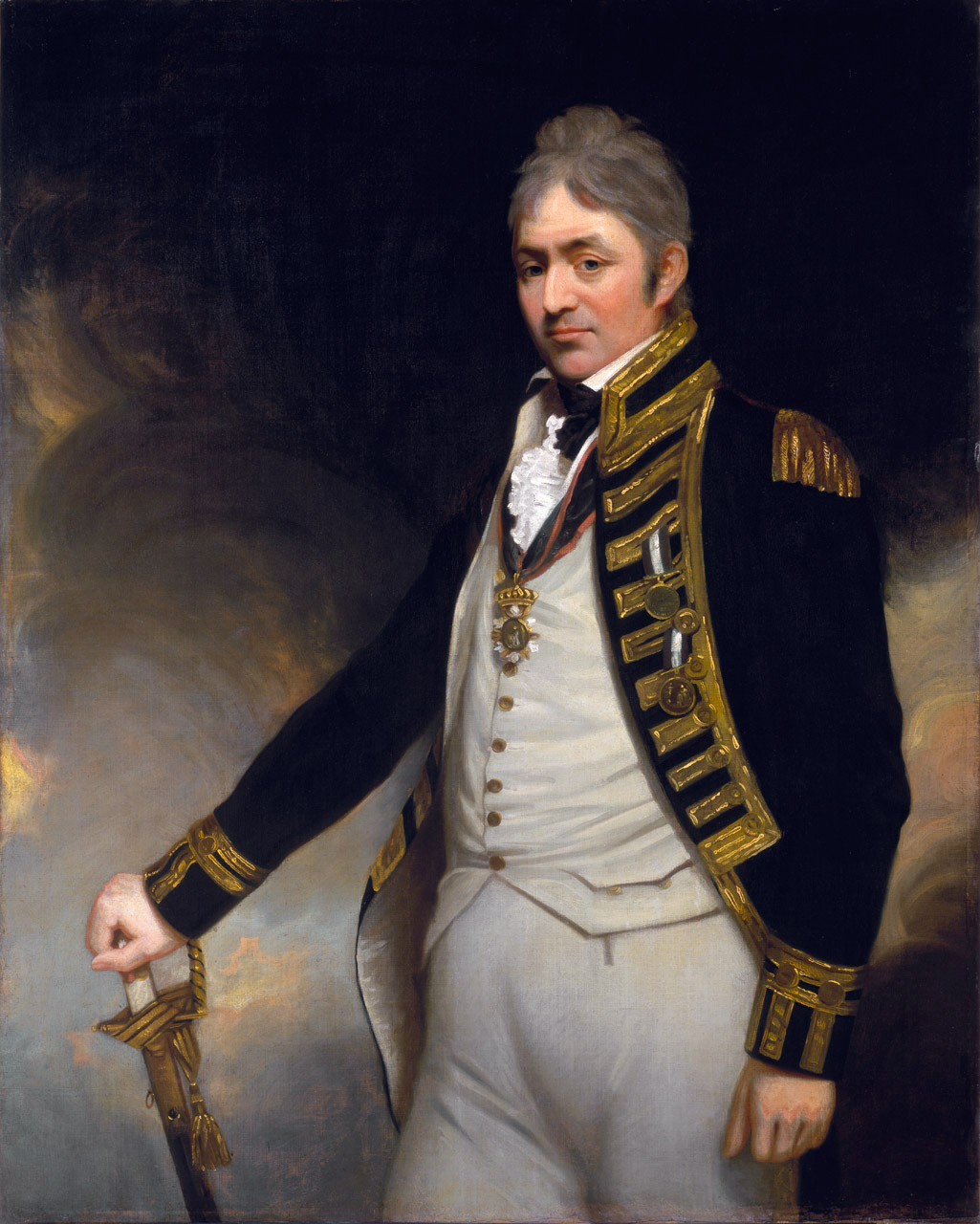
- Portrait by Sir William Beechey, 1804–1805
- Born: 22 June 1757; London, England
- Died: 1 February 1807 (aged 49); Aboard HMS Blenheim
- Relatives: Edward Thomas Troubridge (son)
- Military career
- Allegiance: Great Britain; United Kingdom
- Branch: Royal Navy
- Service years: 1773–1807
- Rank: Rear-Admiral of the Blue
- Commands: HMS Chaser; HMS Lizard; HMS Active; HMS Defence; HMS Sultan; HMS Thames; HMS Castor; HMS Culloden
- Conflicts: American War of Independence; Battle of Sadras; Battle of Providien; Battle of Negapatam (1782); Battle of Trincomalee; Battle of Cuddalore (1783); French Revolutionary Wars; Frigate action of 29 May 1794; Battle of Cape St. Vincent (1797); Battle of Santa Cruz de Tenerife (1797); Battle of the Nile; Siege of Malta (1798–1800); Napoleonic Wars
- Awards: Order of Saint Ferdinand and of Merit; Naval Gold Medal

Rear-Admiral of the Blue Sir Thomas Troubridge, 1st Baronet (22 June 1757 – 1 February 1807) was a Royal Navy officer. As a junior officer he saw action at the Battle of Sadras in February 1782 during the American War of Independence and the Battle of Trincomalee in September 1782 during the American War of Independence. He commanded the third-rate Culloden at the Battle of Cape St. Vincent in February 1797 during the French Revolutionary Wars. He went on to be First Naval Lord and then served as Commander-in-Chief, East Indies, during the Napoleonic Wars.

== Naval career ==
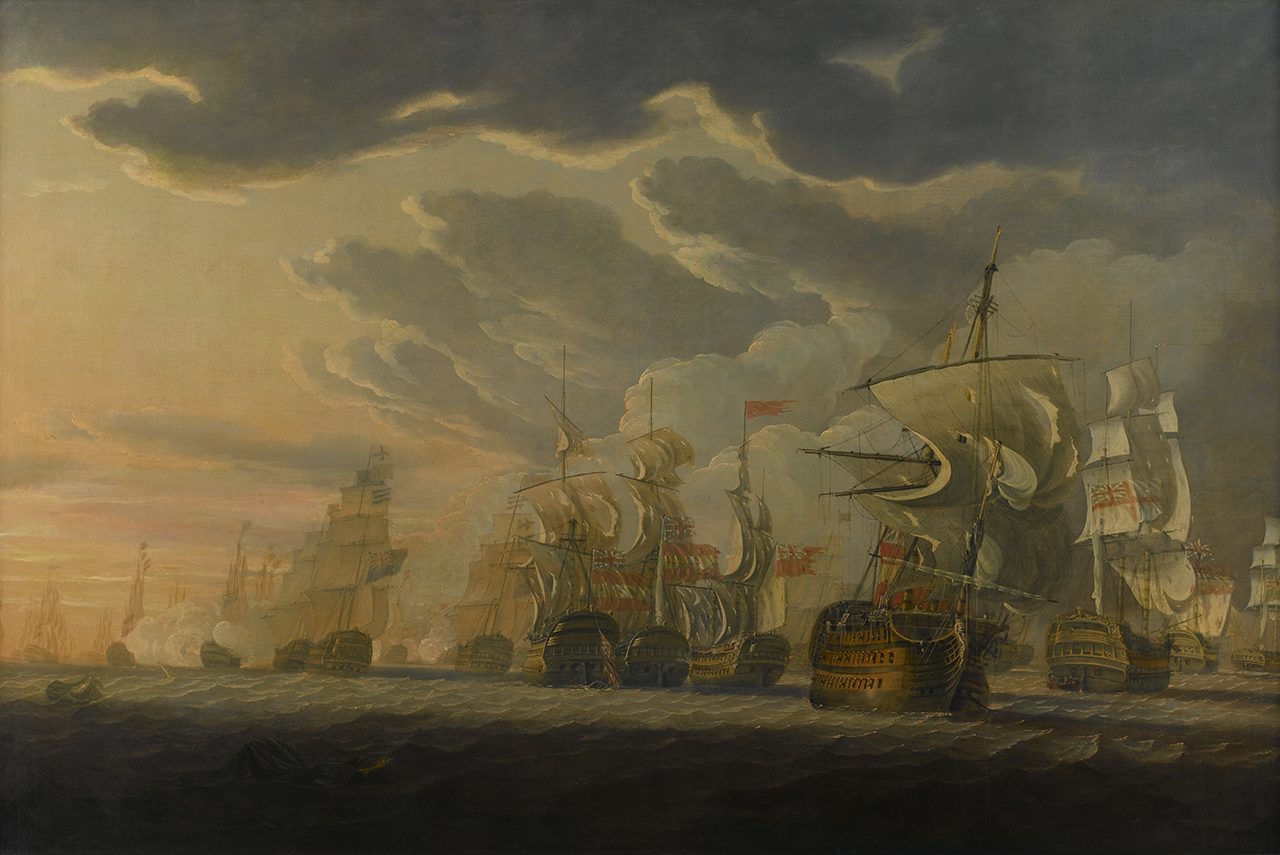
The Battle of Cape St. Vincent, where Troubridge distinguished himself

Born the son of Richard Troubridge, a baker, Troubridge was educated at St Paul's School, London. He entered the Royal Navy as an able seaman on 8 October 1773 and, together with Horatio Nelson, served in the East Indies in the frigate HMS Seahorse. He was promoted from midshipman to lieutenant on 1 January 1781 on the newly purchased sloop Chaser. On 3 March he returned to Seahorse. In her he took part in the Battle of Trincomalee in February 1782 during the American War of Independence and the Battle of Sadras in September 1782 during the Anglo-French War. His first command was the sloop Lizard in October 1782.

Promoted to post-captain on 1 January 1783, Troubridge was given command of the frigate Active and was present at the Siege of Cuddalore in June 1783. After that he transferred to the third-rate Defence. In 1785 Troubridge returned to England in Sultan as flag-captain to Admiral Sir Edward Hughes. He was appointed to the frigate HMS Thames in 1790.

Appointed to command the frigate Castor in May 1794, he and his ship were captured by the French while escorting a convoy, but he was liberated soon afterwards. On his return he was appointed to command Culloden, a third-rate ship of the line, in which he fought at the Battle of the Hyères Islands, led an unsuccessful pursuit of a French squadron in the Aegean Sea, and led the line at the Battle of Cape St. Vincent, being commended for his courage and initiative by Admiral Sir John Jervis.

In July 1797 he assisted Nelson in the unsuccessful attack on Santa Cruz de Tenerife. In August 1798, when getting into position for the attack on the French fleet, Culloden ran aground on a shoal near the entrance to Aboukir Bay and was consequently unable to take any part in the Battle of the Nile. At Nelson's request, however, he was awarded the gold medal commemorating the victory.

Troubridge then served in the Mediterranean and was created a baronet on 30 November 1799. In February 1801 he joined the Board of Admiralty as First Naval Lord. Promoted to Rear-Admiral of the Blue on 21 April 1804, Troubridge was appointed to command the eastern half of the East Indies Station, and he went out in Blenheim with his resignation from the Admiralty Board becoming effective in May 1804.

On his arrival the area of command was changed to that of the Cape Station. He left Madras in January 1807 for the Cape of Good Hope. Off the coast of Madagascar, Blenheim, an old and damaged ship, foundered in a cyclone and the admiral and all others on board perished.

== Personal life ==
Thomas married Frances Northall, daughter of Captain John Northall. Their daughter Charlotte (1788 - 1849) married General Sir Charles Bulkeley Egerton in 1809.

== Arms ==
Coat of arms of Sir Thomas Troubridge, 1st Baronet
Crest A dexter arm embowed habited Azure holding a flagstaff thereon a flag azure charged with two keys in saltire Or. Escutcheon Or on a bridge embattled of three arches through which water is flowing towards the base Proper a tower of the second thereon hoisted a broad pennant flying towards the sinister on a canton Azure two keys in saltire the wards upwards Or. Motto Ne Cede Arduis

== Sources ==
- Laughton, John Knox (1899). "Troubridge, Thomas (1758?-1807)" . In Lee, Sidney (ed.). Dictionary of National Biography. Vol. 57. London: Smith, Elder & Co.
- Crimmin, P. K. "Troubridge, Sir Thomas, first baronet (1757–1807)". Oxford Dictionary of National Biography (online ed.). Oxford University Press. doi:10.1093/ref:odnb/27765. (Subscription, Wikipedia Library access or UK public library membership required.)
- Rodger, N.A.M. (1979). The Admiralty. Offices of State. Lavenham: T. Dalton Ltd. ISBN 0900963948.

Military offices
Preceded by James Gambier	First Naval Lord; 1801–1804	Succeeded by James Gambier
Preceded by Sir Edward Pellew (commanding on his own)	Commander-in-Chief, East Indies (jointly with Sir Edward Pellew); 1805–1807	Succeeded by Sir Edward Pellew (commanding on his own)
Parliament of the United Kingdom
Preceded by William Loftus; Henry Jodrell	Member of Parliament for Great Yarmouth; 1802–1806; With: Thomas Jervis	Succeeded by Edward Harbord; Stephen Lushington
Baronetage of Great Britain
New creation	Baronet (of Plymouth); 1799–1806	Succeeded by Edward Thomas Troubridge
