= Austin Bissell =

- Died: 1807
- Allegiance: Great Britain
- Branch: Royal Navy
- Rank: Commander
- Battles / wars: Napoleonic Wars

Austin Bissell (died 1807) was an officer of the Royal Navy. He was captain of the captured French frigate Créole when she sank on a journey from Jamaica to England.

== Naval career ==
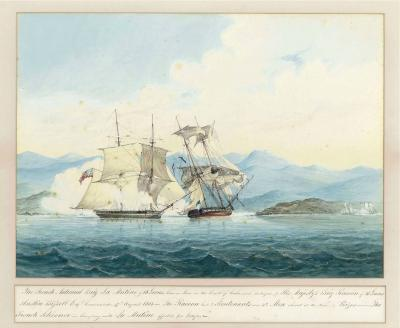
HMS Racoon capturing French navy brig Mutine

=== HMS Racoon ===
On 18 October 1802, Commander Bissell was given command of the 16-gun brig-sloop HMS Racoon. While under his command, Racoon took part in several notable actions.

=== HMS Creole ===
On Tuesday 3 January 1804, Bissell took command of the captured French frigate Créole in Port Royal, Jamaica. However, the ship foundered en route to Britain; nearby British vessels saved Bissell and his crew.

=== Death ===
Bissell died in 1807 when the 74-gun HMS Blenheim, of which he was then captain, foundered in the Indian Ocean.

== Bissell as an author ==
Bissell wrote a biography of Commodore John Blankett's voyages in the Middle East and India. The book was published in 1806 at the expense of the East India Company.

== Bibliography ==
- Bissell, Austin (1806). A Voyage from England to the Red-Sea and along the east coast of Arabia to Bombay, by a squadron under the command of Commodore (afterwards Rear-admiral) John Blankett. East India Company.
- Clowes, William Laird (1997) [1900]. "London". The Royal Navy, A History from the Earliest Times to 1900, Volume V. Chatham Publishing. ISBN 1-86176-014-0.
- Winfield, Rif (2008). British Warships in the Age of Sail 1793–1817: Design, Construction, Careers and Fates. Seaforth. ISBN 978-1-86176-246-7.
