= French ship Jean-Jacques Rousseau =

Ship of the line of the French Navy

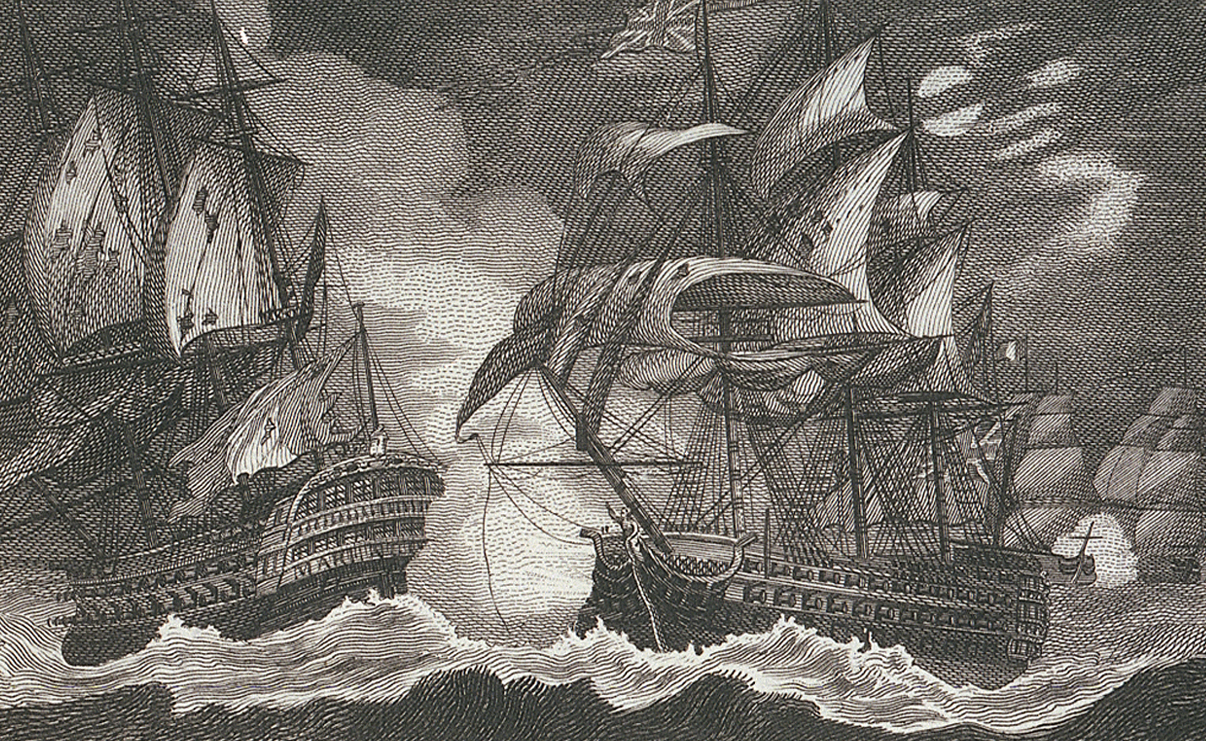
- Marengo (left) at the action of 13 March 1806

History

France
- Name: Jean-Jacques Rousseau
- Builder: Toulon
- Laid down: September 1794
- Launched: 21 July 1795
- Commissioned: October 1796
- Renamed: Marengo, 2 December 1802
- Captured: By HMS London, 13 March 1806

United Kingdom
- Name: Marengo
- Acquired: 13 March 1806
- Fate: Broken up, 1816

General characteristics
- Class & type: Téméraire-class ship of the line
- Displacement: 3,069 tonneaux
- Tons burthen: 1,537 port tonneaux
- Length: 55.87 metres (183.3 ft) (172 pied)
- Beam: 14.90 metres (48 ft 11 in)
- Draught: 7.26 metres (23.8 ft) (22 pied)
- Propulsion: Up to 2,485 m^{2} (26,750 sq ft) of sails
- Armament: 74 guns: Lower gundeck: 28 × 36-pounder long guns; Upper gundeck: 30 × 18-pounder long guns; Fc and QD: 16 × 8-pounder long guns; 4 × 36-pounder carronades
- Armour: Timber

Jean-Jacques Rousseau was a Téméraire class 74-gun ship of the line of the French Navy, active during the French Directory, French Consulate and First French Empire. Renamed Marengo in 1802, she took part in Linois' operations in the Indian Ocean before her capture by the Royal Navy.

== Career ==
Construction of Jean-Jacques Rousseau began in September 1794 at Toulon, and she was launched on 21 July 1795. In October 1796, under Captain Racord, she was part of the Villeneuve's squadron that sailed from Toulon to Brest.

On 2 December 1802, she was renamed to Marengo, reflecting the political change away from the Revolutionary Republic inspired by Jean-Jacques Rousseau towards the advent of General Bonaparte. On 6 March 1803, she departed Brest as the flagship of a squadron under Admiral Linois, set to take possession of Pondicherry, which the Treaty of Amiens had attributed to France. The squadron also comprised the frigates Belle Poule, Atalante and Sémillante, along with two troopships carrying 1350 soldiers under General Decaen.

From May 1803, tensions rose between France and England. Linois' squadron arrived at Pondicherry on 11 July, where the 64-gun HMS Trident and the sloop HMS Rattlesnake lay at anchor. British authorities delayed the transfer until the French brig Bélier arrived with news that the War of the Third Coalition was about to break out in Europe. Finding his squadron vulnerable to a surprise attack, Linois made a dramatic night escape to Isle de France.

War eventually broke out in September, and Linois reinforced French garrisons at La Réunion and Batavia, and then set out to prey upon British trade in the Indian Ocean. In October, after having sent Atalante to a mission to Muscat, he headed for the Dutch East Indies with Belle Poule and Sémillante, where he expected to find supplies. On his way, he raided the British settlement at Bengkulu, capturing two merchantmen; 5 others were scuttled by fire by their own crews to avoid capture. At Batavia, Linois found little support from the Dutch authorities.

In early 1804, Linois attempted to intercept a large convoy of Honourable East India Company (HEIC) East Indiamen, leading to the Battle of Pulo Aura. The British commander, Commodore Dance, led a vigorous defence and Linois, feeling isolated away from supplies and repairs and unwilling to risk attrition, chose to withdraw. The news of Linois' failure further discredited him at Batavia, and the growing reluctance of the Dutch to provide support to his squadron forced him to return to Isle de France.

In August Linois was cruising in the Indian Ocean in Marengo, together with Atalante and Sémillante. On the 18th, near Desnoeufs Island they encountered and captured two British merchant men, Charlotte and Upton Castle. They had been on their way to Bombay when Linois's squadron captured them.

Linois described Charlotte as being copper-sheathed, of 650 tons and 16 guns. She was carrying a cargo of rice. Upton Castle he described as being copper-sheathed, of 627 tons, and 14 guns. She was carrying a cargo of wheat and other products from Bengal. He sent both his prizes into Isle de France (Mauritius).

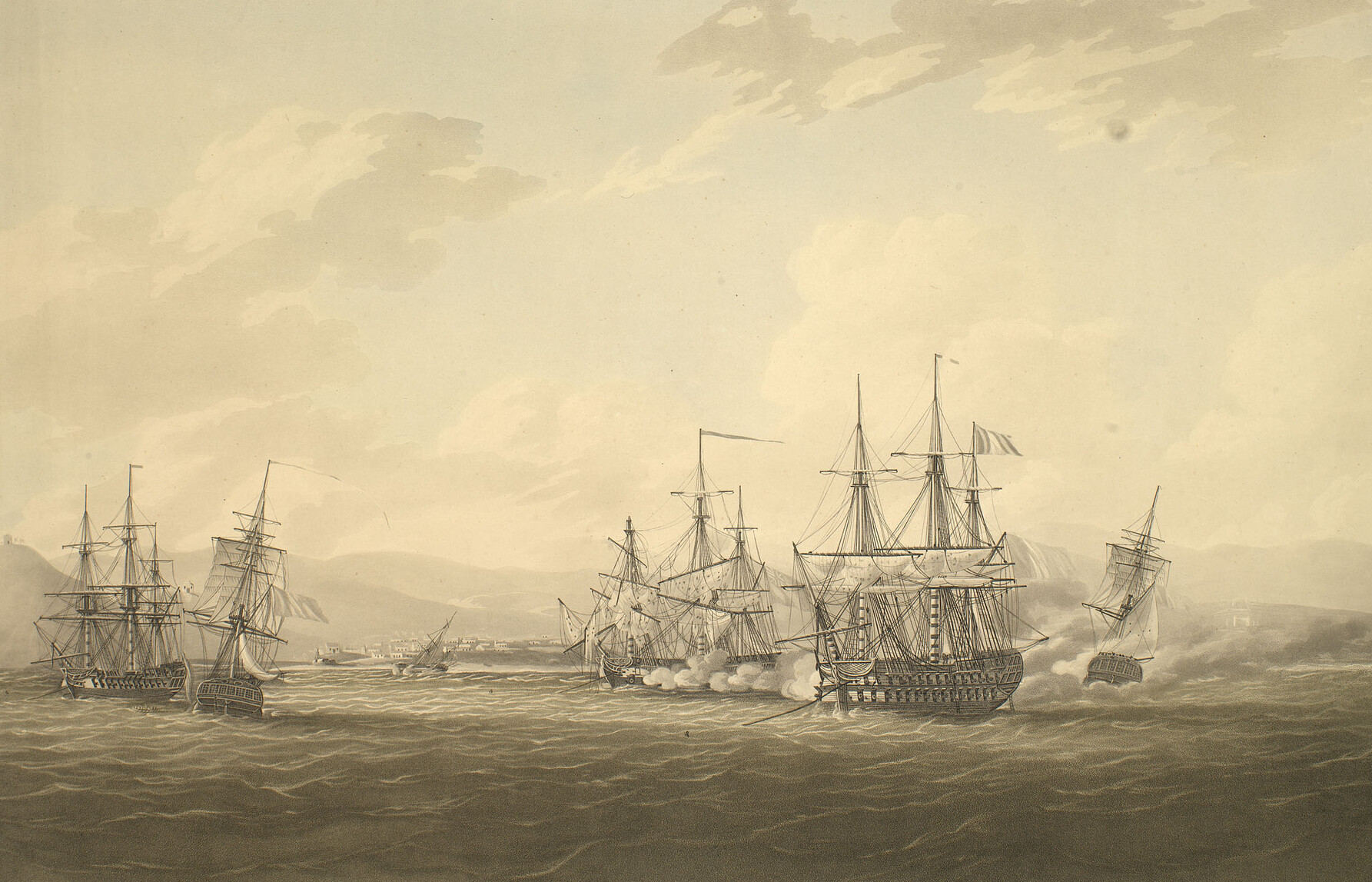
HMS Centurion repelling Marengo at the Battle of Visakhapatnam (the battle occurred at a far greater range than depicted).

In September, Linois attempted another raid against a merchant convoy, leading to the Battle of Visakhapatnam on 18 September. British Rear-Admiral Peter Rainier had replaced the small frigate HMS Wilhelmina with the 50-gun HMS Centurion. Although Centurion was not a match for Marengo, she skillfully used her lower draught to keep Marengo at bay in the shallow waters. There again Linois hesitated to commit his forces and withdrew after a four-hour exchange that left Marengo in need to six month worth of repairs.

On 11 July 1805 the East Indiaman Brunswick and the country ship Sarah were off the Point de Galle when they encountered Marengo and Belle Poule. Marengo captured Brunswick and Belle Poule drove Sarah ashore. Marengo and Belle Poule arrived at the Cape of Good Hope on 13 September. By that time their prize, Brunswick had stranded at the Cape and been lost.

In March 1806, Linois set out to return to France with Marengo and Belle Poule, and prey upon British shipping between St. Helena and the Canary Islands on his way home. On 13 March, he detected a group of ships and sailed in pursuit of what he believed to be a convoy; it was in fact the division of Vice-Admiral Sir John Warren, with seven ships of the line (including the 90-gun London, the 74-gun Ramillies and Repulse, and the 80-gun Foudroyant), two frigates (including the 36-gun Amazon) and one corvette. In the ensuing action of 13 March 1806, London engaged Marengo, which eventually struck her colours; Belle Poule battled against Amazon and later against Ramilles, and had to surrender as well.

== Fate ==
The British took Marengo into service as HMS Marengo. She was used as a prison hulk from 1809 until she was broken up in 1816.
