= HMS Belle Poule (1806) =

Frigate of the Royal Navy

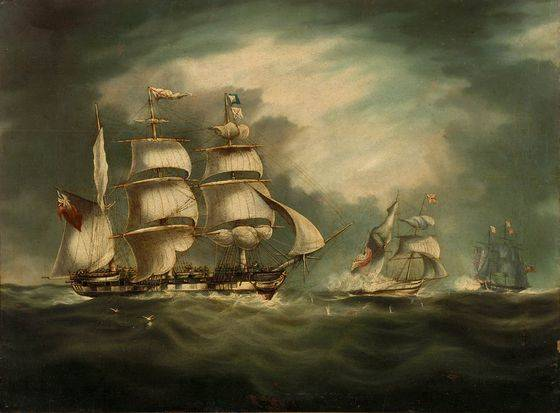
- Capture of the 'Gypsy', 30 April 1812: left to right: HMS Belle Poule, Gypsy, and HMS Hermes, by Thomas Buttersworth

History

France
- Name: Belle Poule
- Laid down: June 1801
- Launched: 17 April 1802
- Fate: Captured by Royal Navy, 13 March 1806

United Kingdom
- Name: HMS Belle Poule
- Acquired: Captured on 13 March 1806
- Reclassified: Troopship in 1814; Prison ship in 1815
- Honours and awards: Naval General Service Medal with clasp "14 Dec. Boat Service 1814"
- Fate: Sold on 11 June 1816

General characteristics
- Class & type: 40-gun Virginie-class frigate; re-rated as 38-gun fifth rate after capture
- Displacement: 1,390 tonneaux
- Tons burthen: 720 port tonneaux; 107664/94 (bm)
- Length: 156 ft 8 in (47.8 m) (gundeck)
- Beam: 39 ft 11 in (12.2 m)
- Draught: 13 ft 4 in (4.1 m)
- Depth of hold: 13 ft 4 in (4.1 m)
- Propulsion: Sails
- Sail plan: Full-rigged ship
- Complement: 284 (later 315)
- Armament: UD: 28 × 18-pounder guns; QD: 14 × 32-pounder carronades; Fc: 2 × 9-pounder guns & 2 × 32-pounder carronades

HMS Belle Poule was a Royal Navy fifth-rate frigate, formerly Belle Poule, a Virginie-class frigate of the French Navy that had been built by the Crucy family's shipyard at Basse-Indre to a design by Jacques-Noël Sané. She was launched on 17 April 1802, and saw active service in the East. In 1806 a British squadron under Sir John Borlase Warren captured her off La Palma in the Canary Islands. The Admiralty commissioned her into the Royal Navy as HMS Belle Poule. She was sold in 1816.

== French Navy service ==
In March 1803, she joined the fleet of Rear-Admiral Charles-Alexandre Léon Durand Linois, whose mission was to re-take the colonies of the Indian Ocean, given to English at the peace of Amiens. The fleet included the 74-gun ship of the line Marengo, the frigates Atalante, Belle Poule and Sémillante, troop ships, and transports with food and ammunition.

On 15 June 1803 Belle Poule landed troops at Pondichéry in India. However, the French fleet left the next day and the troops surrendered in September.

At the beginning of November, the division set sail for Batavia to defend the Dutch East Indies. En route, Linois destroyed the English counters in Bencoolen, capturing five ships, and sailed for the South China Sea, where the China Fleet of the British East India Company was expected. The fleets met in the Battle of Pulo Aura, but the greater numbers and aggressive action of the British East Indiamen, some of whom flew Royal Navy flags, drove the French away. Linois returned to Batavia. He dispatched Atalante and Belle Poule to the Gulf of Bengal, where Belle Poule captured a few ships before returning to Ile de France. Among the ships was Althea, which Atalante and Belle Poule captured on 17 April 1804.

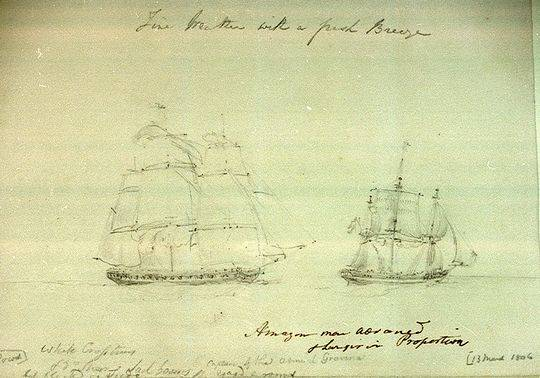
HMS Amazon pursuing unnamed French vessel, possibly Belle Poule, by Nicholas Pocock

In 1805 and 1806, Belle Poule and some other ships of the division cruised the African coast between the Red Sea and the Cape of Good Hope, capturing some ships. At the action of 13 March 1806, Linois met with the division of Vice-Admiral Sir John Warren, with seven ships of the line (including the 108-gun London, the 82-gun Ramillies and Repulse, and the 80-gun Foudroyant), two frigates (including the 48-gun Amazon) and one corvette. After a fierce duel with London, Marengo struck her colours; Belle Poule battled against Amazon and later against Ramillies, and had to surrender as well.

At the time of her capture Belle Poule was armed with forty 18-pounder guns, had a crew of 320 men, and was under the command of Captain Brouillac. Marengo and Belle Poule had lost 65 men killed and 80 wounded. The British on London and Amazon had 13 officers and men killed and 26 officers and men wounded.

== Royal Navy service ==
=== Adriatic ===
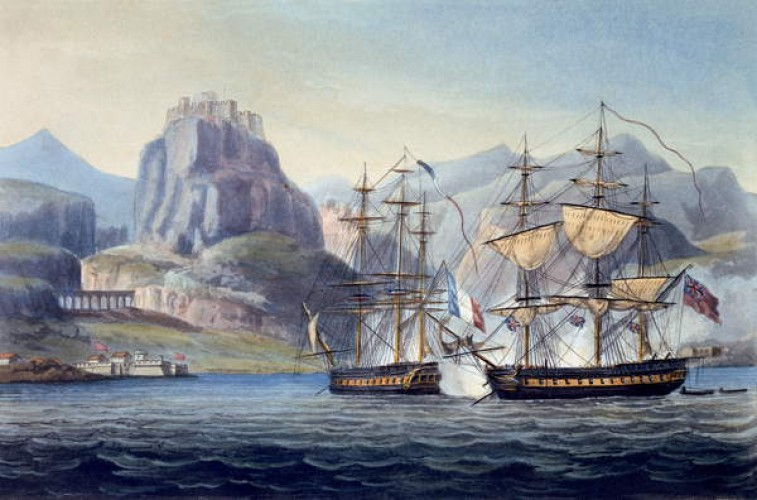
The capture in 1809 of Var by HMS Belle Poule at Valona harbour off Corfu

She entered service under the same name in 1808 under captain James Brisbane, joining the forces operating in the Adriatic campaign of 1807-1814 off Corfu, successfully blockading the island. In February 1809 Brisbane captured the storeship Var in a raid on the harbour at Valona. Var was anchored under the guns of two fortresses that nevertheless did not fire their guns, leaving Belle Poule free to concentrate her fire on the French vessel. Var was pierced for 32 guns but only had twenty-two 9-pounder guns and four 24-pounder carronades mounted. She had a crew of 200 men and was under the command of Capitaine de Frigate Palin, however Brisbane was unable to ascertain her losses as her crew abandoned her as she struck. She had been sailing from Corfu for any port in Italy that she could reach. The British then used Var as a storeship too.

Between 2 and 12 October of the same year Belle Poule was involved in the invasions of the Ionian Islands of Cerigo, Cephalonia, and Zante, and would share in the booty captured there.

On 10 March 1810 Belle Poule captured Charlotta.

Then a British force attacked the fortress of Santa Maura, which was a French strongpoint off Greece's west coast. Belle Poule's marines formed part of the assault force; the fortress surrendered on 16 April 1810. Belle Poule had one man, Lieutenant Morrison, of the Royal Marines, wounded at this time. In all, during the siege of Santa Maura, from 31 March to 10 April, Belle Poule suffered six men wounded.

On 21 August 1810 Belle Poule captured Saint Nicholo. Then on 11 December, Belle Poule captured the brig Carlotta, pierced for 14 guns but with only 10 mounted. She had a crew of 100 men and when captured was sailing from Venice to Corfu. The Royal Navy took her into service as HMS Carlotta. Montague and Acorn shared in the prize money for the hull. At around the same time Belle Poule also assisted at the capture of a French schooner on the Dalmatian Coast.

On 30 January 1811 Belle Poule, Leonidas, Victorious, and Imogen shared in the capture and destruction of the Italian man-of-war schooner Leoben. Leoben was sailing along the Albanian coast from Venice to Corfu with a cargo of ordnance stores when the British caught her. She was armed with ten guns and a crew of 60 men. Her own crew set her on fire and she subsequently blew up.

From 4–5 May 1811, Belle Poule participated with Alceste in an attack on Parenza (Istria). They chased a French 18-gun brig into the harbour but the ships could not close enough to bombard her. Instead, the two vessels landed 200 seamen and all their marines on an island nearby. They then landed two 9-pounders and two howitzers that they placed in one battery, and a field piece that they placed farther away. Eventually, they and the French in Parenza engaged in five hours of mutual bombardment, during which the British were able to sink the brig. They then returned men and cannons to their ships. In the action Belle Poule had one man killed and three wounded and Alceste had two men killed; all casualties occurred onshore.

Belle Poule then returned to Britain to join the Channel Fleet. On 22 December 1811, Belle Poule and Medusa captured and destroyed two chasse marees.

=== War of 1812 ===
During 1812 Belle Poule patrolled the Western Approaches, capturing numerous American merchant vessels and privateers. On 27 January she detained and sent in Spy from New York. Then she captured Prudentia on 31 January and Don Roderick on 16 February. At the capture of Don Roderick, Belle Poule was in company with Achates, Dryad, and Lyra.

On 30 April 1812, Belle Poule and Hermes captured the American privateer schooner Gipsy or Gipsey, out of New York, in the middle of the Atlantic and after a three-day chase. Gipsey surrendered twice to Hermes and twice got away again before Belle Poule caught her. Gipsey was of 300 tons (bm) and was armed with twelve 18-pounder carronades and an 18-pounder gun on a pivot mount.

On 26 May, Belle Poule captured General Gates while in company with Dryad and Abercrombie. Armide shared by agreement. Three days later Armide captured Purse, and Belle Poule shared by agreement.

In September 1812 George Harris replaced Brisbane and over the next year Belle Poule captured several American vessels, including four privateers. Warspite and Belle Poule captured Mars and her cargo, on 26 February 1813. On 11 March, Belle Poule and the privateer Earl St Vincent captured the American ship John and Francis, of 220 tons, two guns and 16 men. She was sailing from Bordeaux to New York with a cargo of brandy and wine.

On 3 April 1813 Belle Poule took the schooner Grand Napoleon, Howard, master, after a chase of nine hours. She was 29 days from New York, carrying a cargo of cotton and coffee to Bordeaux. She was a new vessel of 305 or 340 tons burthen, pierced for 22 guns but carrying only four, and had a crew of 43 men. Harris described her as "copper-fastened, and in every respect one of the finest vessels I ever saw." That same day Dispatch captured the Prussian vessel Enigheidt. Briton, Belle Poule and Royalist shared by agreement. Belle Poule also captured the American schooner Napoleon, which may have been a different vessel than the Grand Napoleon. With respect to the Napoleon, Belle Poule was in company with Briton and the hired armed cutter Fancy, with Dispatch and Royalist sharing by agreement.

Belle Poule and Pyramus on 20 April 1813 took the 10-gun letter of marque schooner Zebra and her crew of 38 men. Zebra was sailing from Bordeaux to New York. At the time of the capture Andromache was in sight. The navy took Zebra into service as Pictou

On 11 May Belle Poule took Revenge after a chase that lasted from 5 p.m. the previous evening until 2am. Revenge was a new vessel, sailing from Charleston to Bordeaux. She had a crew of 32 men and was pierced for 16 guns but carried only four long 9-pounders.

On 20 September Belle Poule captured two French chasse marees. the first was Rose, of 32 tons and five men, sailing from Bordeaux to Nantes. The second was Ambition, of 25 tons and three men, sailing from Bordeaux to Rochelle. (Note: A first-class share of the prize money was worth £278 19s 4 1/2d; a sixth-class share, that of an ordinary seaman, was worth £2 8s 10d.)

Lastly, on 14 December Belle Poule took the brig Squirrel, which was sailing from Arcasson, in the Gironde, to New York. The brig was of 169 tons, armed with two guns and had a crew of 17 men. Belle Poule was in company with Castilian and Tartarus.

In 1814 Belle Poule was under Captain Edward Williams. Then she entered the Gironde in Southern France. Before 9 April, a landing party of seamen and marines from Belle Poule, under Captain George Harris, marched 50 miles (80 km), successively entering and destroying the batteries of Pointe Coubre, Pointe Nègre, Royan, Soulac, and Mèche. In all, the landing party destroyed forty-seven 36-pounder guns and seventeen 13-inch mortars. On his return from this expedition, Harris organized the siege of the fortress at Blaye. Rear Admiral Penrose then had Belle Poule sail up the Gironde, "in advance of the advanced squadron".

Following a request from the Duke of Wellington, Belle Poule was commissioned as a troopship in June under Captain Francis Baker. She was fitted for that role in August and September. On 15 August she was in Plymouth, having come from Portsmouth with the 93rd Regiment of Foot. Belle Poule was in a squadron, led by HMS Bedford as flagship, that carried the advance guard of Major General Keane's army, which was sailing for North America. On 17 September she embarked troops before sailing for Bermuda the next day and then on to New Orleans. The 93rd would then serve at the Battle of New Orleans, where they would take heavy casualties.

Belle Poule was part of the flotilla that transported Pakenham's troops who fought at the battle of New Orleans. In the run-up to that battle her boats participated in the Battle of Lake Borgne on 12–14 December 1814. Her only casualties were two men slightly wounded. Many years later her crew received a distribution of head-money arising from the capture of American gun-boats and sundry bales of cotton at the battle. (Note: A first-class share of the prize money was worth £34 12s 9 1/4d; a sixth-class share, that of an ordinary seaman, was worth 7s 10 3/4d.) In 1847 the Admiralty issued a clasp (or bar) marked "14 Dec. Boat Service 1814" to survivors of the boat service who claimed the clasp to the Naval General Service Medal. (Note: The 'Names of Ships for which Claims have been proved' are as follows: warships Tonnant, Norge, Royal Oak, Ramillies, Bedford, Armide, Cydnus, Trave, Seahorse, Sophie, and Meteor; troopships Gorgon, Diomede, Alceste, and Belle Poule.)

== Fate ==
Belle Poule returned to Portsmouth on 17 May 1815. A week later she sailed for Cork. She was converted to a prison hulk in 1815. She was sold on 11 June 1816 for £2,700.

== Post script ==
In January 1819, the London Gazette reported that Parliament had voted a grant to all those who had served under the command of Lord Viscount Keith in 1812, between 1812 and 1814, and in the Gironde. Belle Poule was listed among the vessels that had served under Keith in the Gironde. (Note: The sum of the two tranches of payment for that service was £272 8s 5d for a first-class share; the amount for a sixth-class share was £3 3s 5d.)
