= HMS Cornwallis (1805) =

Frigate of the Royal Navy

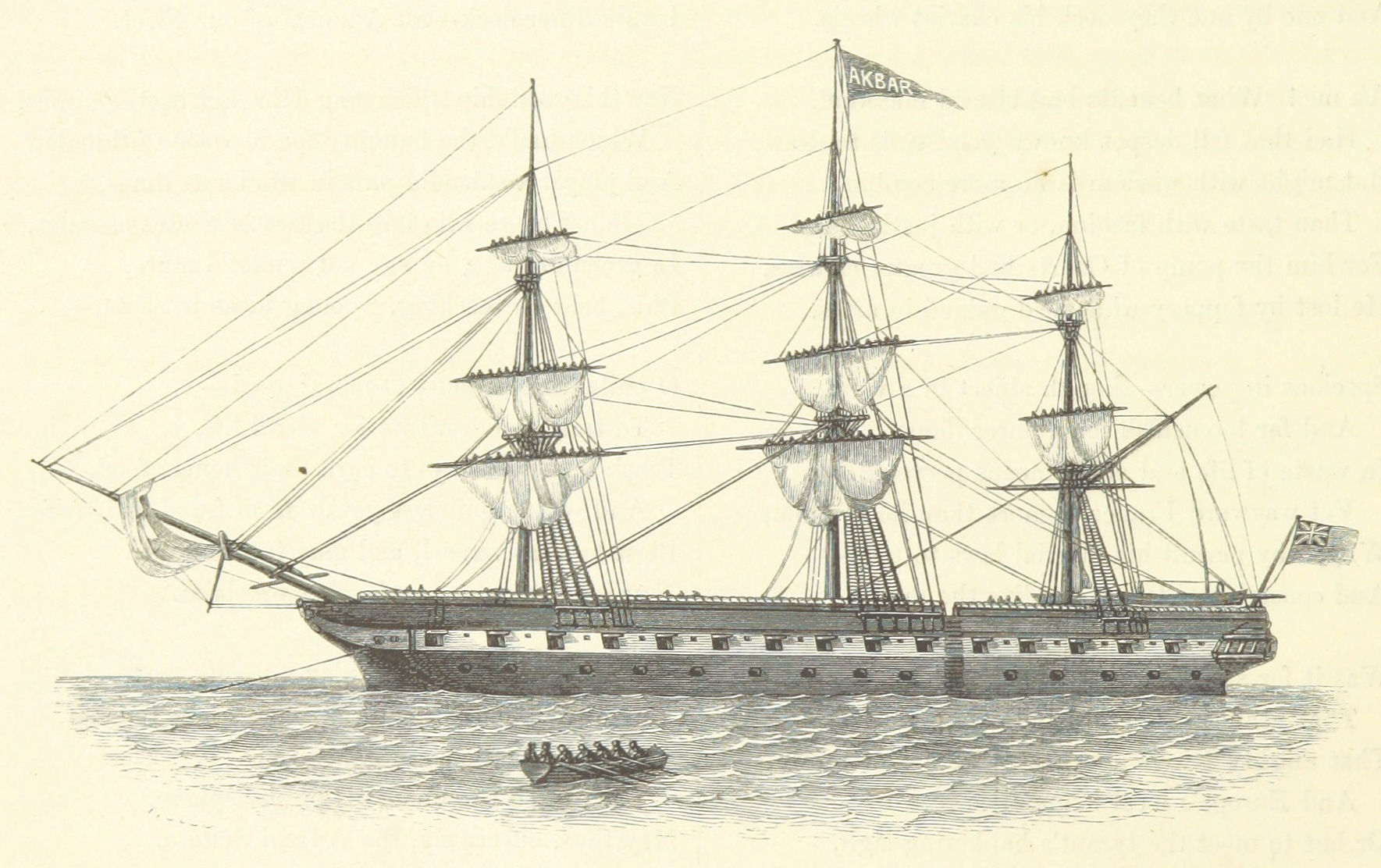

History

British East India Company
- Name: Marquis Cornwallis (Note: Phipps refers to her as Cornwallis, and gives a launch year of 1800. Wadia names her as Marquis Cornwallis with a launch year of 1800.)
- Namesake: Marquess Cornwallis
- Operator: British East India Company
- Builder: M/Shipwright Jemsetjee Bomanjee, Bombay
- Launched: 1800
- Fate: Sold 1805

United Kingdom
- Name: HMS Cornwallis
- Acquired: March 1805 (by purchase); Registered on 13 August 1806
- Renamed: HMS Akbar in February 1811
- Reclassified: Storeship in February 1813; Frigate in March 1813; Troopship in 1817; Quarantine ship in 1824; Lazarette in 1827; Training ship in 1852; Quarantine vessel c. 1858
- Honours and awards: Naval General Service Medal (NGSM) with clasp "Java"
- Fate: Sold 1869 for breaking up

General characteristics (Note: In the measurements below, the first measurement is from Winfield, who used Admiralty records. The second measurement is from the voyage records in the British Library, who used data from the EIC based on measurements taken in 1803.)
- Class & type: Fourth rate
- Tons burthen: 138717/95, or 1360, or 1363 (bm)
- Length: 164 ft 4 1/2 in (50.1 m), or 171 ft 4 in (52.2 m) (overall); 140 ft 7 7/8 in (42.9 m), or 139 ft 7 3/4 in (42.564 m)
- Beam: 43 ft 1 1/4 in (13.1 m), or 42 ft 9 1/2 in (13.0 m)
- Depth of hold: 15 ft 3 in (4.6 m), or 14 ft 10 1/2 in (4.5 m)
- Complement: 430
- Armament: Frigate; Upper deck (UD): 30 × 24-pounder guns; QD: 26 × 42-pounder carronades; Fc: 1 × 18- or 24-pounder gun; Troopship; UD: 22 × 32-pounder carronades + 2 × 9-pounder guns; QD: 8 × 32-pounder carronades; Fc: 2 × 9-pounder guns

HMS Cornwallis was a Royal Navy 54-gun fourth rate. Jemsatjee Bomanjee built the Marquis Cornwallis of teak for the Honourable East India Company (EIC) between 1800 and 1801. In March 1805 Admiral Sir Edward Pellew purchased her from the Company shortly after she returned from a voyage to Britain. She served in the Far East, sailing to Australia and the Pacific Coast of South America before returning to India. In February 1811 the Admiralty renamed her HMS Akbar. She captured forts and vessels in the Celebes and Amboyna, and participated in the invasion of Isle de France, and the 1811 invasion of Java. She also served in the West Indies before being laid up at Portsmouth in December 1816. She then stayed in Britain in a number of stationary medical and training capacities until the Admiralty sold her in the 1860s.

== Service with the EIC ==
The EIC had Marquis Cornwallis built for long-range convoy escort duties. As such, she was a spar-decked frigate. As of 1 January 1802 she was under the command of Captain Thomas Hardie. (Note: His commission as captain in the Bombay Marine was dated 9 May 1793.)

In December 1801, she sailed, together with Upton Castle (a country ship), Betsey (an armed HEIC brig), some other vessels, and 1000 troops to Daman and Diu to persuade the Portuguese governor to resist any French incursion. The expedition was under the command of Captain John Mackellar, of the Royal Navy, whose own vessel, Terpsichore, was not ready for sea. The governor accepted the British reinforcements, which, as it turned out, were not needed.

Marquis Cornwallis, under the command of Captain Isaac Godsalve Richardson, (Note: His commission as captain in the Bombay Marine was dated 9 May 1793.) left Bombay on 7 Feb 1803, reaching St Helena on 12 May, and arriving at the Downs on 1 August. On 8 May 1804, Marquis Cornwallis sailed from Portsmouth, still under Richardson's command. She sailed via St Helena to Bombay, where the company intended for her to remain. She was convoying Marquis of Ely, Marchioness of Exeter, Lord Nelson, Brunswick, Princess Charlotte, Marquis Wellesley, and Ann. (Note: The Naval Chronicle gives the departure date for the convoy as 20 March.)

== Royal Navy service ==
In 1805 Admiral Pellew purchased her for £68,630, and commissioned her "immediately". Commander Charles James Johnston took command in February 1806. She then served off Bombay and engaged in the long-distance blockade of Isle de France (now Mauritius).

On 11 November 1806, Sceptre and Cornwallis sailed into Saint Paul's Bay, on Île Bonaparte, in an attempt to cut out vessels there, which consisted of the French frigate Sémillante, three other armed ships and twelve captured British ships. (The eight ships that were prizes to Sémillante had a collective value of £1.5 million.) Sceptre and Cornwallis fired on the French and took fire in return. However, when the slight breeze failed, Sceptre and Cornwallis found themselves unable to maneuver. They therefore left without having accomplished anything, but apparently also without having suffered damage or losses.

=== Pacific cruise ===
In February 1807, Cornwallis, under the command of Johnston, was ordered on a cruise against Spanish shipping and ports on the west coast of South America. Johnston used Port Jackson as a base for refreshment and re-supply before proceeding on his cruise between May and October 1807. Cornwallis sailed first to Juan Fernandez, then cruised northward along the coasts of Chile, Peru, Panama, and Mexico, capturing 17 vessels, most of them small, two of which were sent as prizes to Port Jackson. One of them, the re-captured South Sea whaler Atlantic, was found to be too unseaworthy for a Pacific crossing; her captors scuttled her off Punta Mala (Panama) on 7 September. The brig Rosalía, of 375 tons, was captured at the Peruvian port of Ilo on 13 July. Cornwallis took her to Pisco with other prizes, and then dispatched her to Port Jackson on 17 July with seven men on board under the command of Lieutenant John Garland, Cornwallis's master. Rosalía was wrecked on the Minerva Reefs, 1,300 kilometres from Norfolk Island. The survivors then sailed to Norfolk Island without chart or quadrant. This was a feat of navigation that ranked with that of William Bligh from Tofua to Kupang in Bounty's launch in 1789, or that of William and Mary Bryant and their companions from Port Jackson to Kupang in a cutter in 1792. The Calcutta Gazette of 25 February 1808 reported the presence of the Cornwallis at Malacca the previous month, and said that:

Captain Johnson [sic] was returned from a cruize of upwards of nine months, during which time he had proceeded along the coast of South America; had been at New Holland, Owyhee and other islands in the South Sea. He had destroyed near 30 vessels, and had captured three, which he left at Port Jackson.

The cruise is commemorated in the name Johnston Atoll, which atoll Captain Johnston sighted on 15 December 1807 while proceeding on his course from Hawaii to Canton. Also, Port Pegasus on Stewart Island and Pegasus Bay on the Banks Peninsula are named for the captured ship Pegaso, re-named Pegasus after being sent to Port Jackson and sold as a prize. (Note: Her new owners then employed Pegasus in seal hunting on the coasts of New Zealand.)

=== East Indies ===
In 1808, command of Cornwallis passed to Captain Fleetwood Pellew. Cornwallis, in company with Sceptre, engaged and damaged Sémillante, together with the shore batteries whose protection she had sought.

In 1809 Captain Christopher Cole took command. When he moved to Caroline, William Augustus Montagu replaced him. Montagu then engaged in a number of operations in the Dutch East Indies, attacking forts on islands in the Celebes and Amboyna.

On 17 January, Montagu and Cornwallis attacked a Dutch fort at Boolo Combo in Bouthian Bay in the Celebes. Montagu, under a flag of truce, had requested permission to water his ship. When the Dutch commander refused, the British landed a small force of 100 men from the European Madras regiment. The 30 or so Dutch troops and 200 local troops quickly gave up the fort, but continued to snipe from the woods. The British burnt 11 small vessels (20-50 tons each), and the public buildings, took the ammunition, and spiked the eight 9-pounder guns and two brass field pieces there. The action cost the British one man killed, and nine wounded, including the captain commanding the landing force, who was lightly wounded.

On 1 February Montagu spied a brig taking shelter under the guns of Manippa. He sent in three boats which brought the brig out. The British suffered no casualties despite coming under heavy small arms fire from the fort. Montagu took the cargo of foodstuffs off the brig to feed his crew, and then burnt the vessel. There were no British casualties

In February 1810, the British attacked Amboyna. In the campaign, Cornwallis captured the ship Mandarine, of 16 guns and 66 men, Captain Besman, on 3 February after a chase of four hours. Madarine had been out for four weeks but had captured nothing. Cornwallis suffered only one man wounded in the action. Mandarine then served as a tender to Cornwallis. (Note: Mandarine is not Mandarin, which the British also captured during the same campaign.)

On 1 March Cornwallis chased a Dutch man-of-war brig all day until she took refuge in a small bay on the north side of the island of Amblaw. The wind being light and variable, and night approaching, Montagu sent in Cornwallis's boats, under the command of Lieutenant Henry John Peachey. After rowing all night, they captured the Dutch brig Margaritta Louisa, under Captain De Ruyter on 2 March. Margaritta Louisa was pierced for 14 guns but carried only eight, and a crew of 40 men. Margaritta Louisa had left Surabaya nine days earlier with 20 to 30,000 dollars for Ambonya, and supplies for Ternate. In the boarding, the British had one man seriously wounded and four men lightly wounded; the Dutch lost one man killed and 20 wounded.

Cornwallis, Dover, and Samarang in January 1816 shared in the prize money awarded for sundry property captured on and off Ambonya between 19 February 1810 and 21 March. (Note: A first-class share was worth £991 13 s 9d; a sixth-class share was worth £9 2s 3d.) Cornwallis and Dover also shared in Samarang's capture on 28 March of the Dutch brig Recruiter. (Note: A first-class share was worth £23 18s 9 1/2d; a sixth-class share was worth 3s 10d.)

In late 1810, Cornwallis was deployed with Albemarle Bertie's squadron that forced the surrender of Isle de France. William Fisher took command in December 1810 after Montagu was selected from among the captains assembled for the invasion and reassigned to lead a naval brigade in support of the British Army forces' ground offensive. (Note: The Admiral's share of the prize money was £2650 5s 2d. A first-class share was worth £278 19s 5 3/4d; a sixth-class share, that of an ordinary seaman, was worth £3 7s 6 1/4d. A fourth and final payment was made in July 1828. A first-class share was worth £29 19s 5 1/4d; a sixth-class share was worth 8s 2 1/2d. This time, Bertie received £314 14s 3 1/2d.)

In February 1811, Cornwallis was renamed HMS Akbar, freeing the name for the 3rd-rate ship of the line HMS Cornwallis that was launched in Bombay in 1813.

On 29 June 1811 Salsette captured the slaver Expedition off Mauritius. The prize crew took the ship and the slaves on her to the Portuguese colony of Goa because selling slaves was illegal in British India, but not Goa. Salsette shared the prize money with the crews of Drake and Cornwallis.

Between 4 August and 19 September 1811, Akbar participated in the capture of Java. In 1847 the Admiralty awarded the Naval General Service Medal with clasp "Java" to all surviving claimants from the campaign.

=== United Kingdom ===
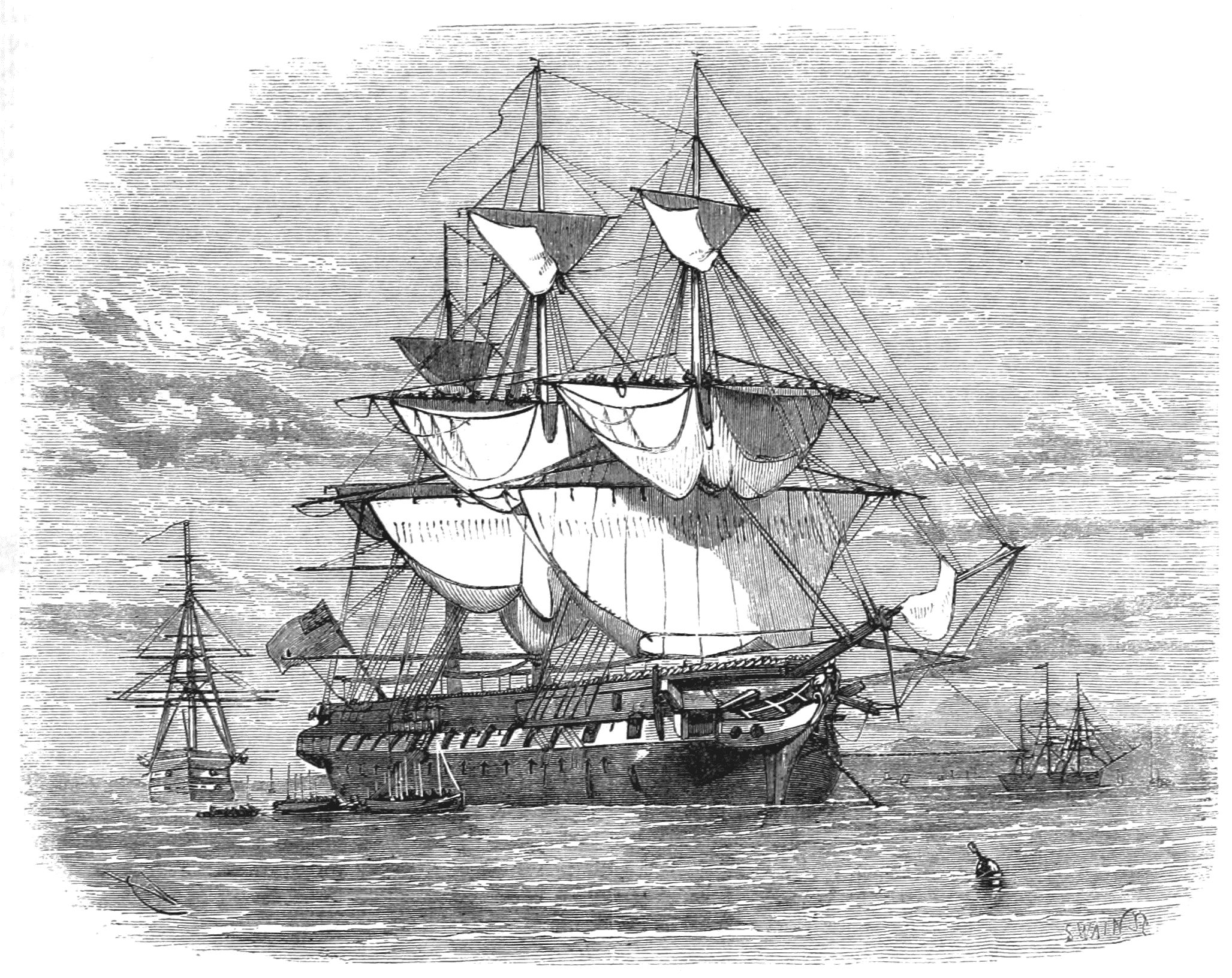
Frigate Akhbar as a reformatory, 1859

Akbar was paid-off in July 1812. Then in February 1813 she was at Woolwich Dockyard for conversion to a store ship. In the spring of 1813, Captain Archibald Dickson was appointed to command Akbar. Between March and December she was converted to a frigate. However, in late August she escorted Windham, General Hewett, and Wanstead out of the Channel as they left Britain with convicts for New South Wales.

=== North America ===
On 15 May 1814, Akbar recaptured Indian Lass. (Note: A first-class share of the prize money was worth £9 19s 9d; a sixth-class share, the entitlement of an ordinary seaman, was worth 3s 11 1/4d.)

Captain Charles Bullen took command in November 1814. Rear Admiral Griffith made her his flagship on the Bermuda station in 1815.

The court martial of captain, officers and men of Cyane for the loss of their vessel took place on board Akbar at Halifax on 28 June 1815. Then on 11 August Akbar and Arab captured Hannah. (Note: A first-class share was worth £275 18s 9 3/4d; a sixth-class share was worth £2 15s 7 1/2d. A second payment for Hannah, plus some money due for the capture of the Friede followed at the end of 1818. A first-class share was worth £109 11s 3 1/2d; a sixth-class share was worth £1 2s 0 3/4d.)

Rear Admiral Griffith shifted his flag into HMS Forth when the Akbar departed Halifax on 10 November 1816, arriving at Portsmouth on 4 December 1816.

== Fate ==
Akbar was laid up at Portsmouth in December 1816, but the next year was fitted as a troopship. Then between June and December 1824 she was fitted to serve as a quarantine ship for Pembroke. In September 1827 she was moved to Liverpool to serve as a lazaretto. She became a training ship in 1852 and a quarantine ship again around 1858. She was sold in 1862 for breaking up.
