= Transport vessels for the Invasion of the Cape Colony =

In 1795 the British government decided to mount an Invasion of the Cape Colony.

The Admiralty sent two battle squadrons to the Cape on 3 April 1795, one under Vice-Admiral Sir George Keith Elphinstone and the other under Commodore John Blankett, carrying a small expeditionary force of 515 soldiers from the 78th Regiment of Foot under Major-General Sir James Henry Craig. (A contingent of EIC troops from Saint Helena also joined this force.)

A larger force under General Alured Clarke was instructed to follow these squadrons on 15 May with troops and supplies for a longer campaign, with orders to hold at Salvador until requested.

Most of the transport vessels of the larger force were East Indiamen of the British East India Company (EIC) that were going on to India and China. The fleet left Portsmouth on 24 May. They gathered at St Salvador in early July, and sailed on 13 July under the escort of Sphinx. However, Sphinx ran into Warren Hastings and both vessels returned to port, Exeter accompanying them.

The vessels were:

- Bombay Castle (1792 EIC ship)
- Brunswick (1792 EIC ship)
- Deptford (1781 EIC ship)
- Earl Cornwallis (1783 ship)
- Earl Howe (1794 EIC ship)
- Exeter (1792 EIC ship)
- General Coote (1781 EIC ship)
- Kent (1781 EIC ship)
- Northumberland (1780 EIC ship)
- Osterley (1780 EIC ship)
- Prince of Wales (armed transport)
- Prince William Henry (1788 EIC ship)
- Warren Hastings (1781 EIC ship)
- Worcester (1785 EIC ship)

The fleet (including Exeter and Warren Hastings), arrived at Simons Bay on 3 September. The troops they brought were from the 95th and 98th Regiments of Foot, and the 2nd Battalions of the 78th and 84th Regiments of Foot. A small contingent of eight guns and a howitzer provided the force with its artillery.

After they had landed their troops, the East Indiamen continued on their voyages to India and China.

In addition, one (Orpheus), or more merchant vessels returning from India apparently participated as well.
