= David Richardson =

David Richardson may refer to:

== Politics ==
- David Richardson (Florida politician) (born 1957), accountant, former member of the Florida House of Representatives, and City Council member and Vice Mayor of Miami Beach
- David Richardson (government official) (born 1965), former acting head of the United States Federal Emergency Management Agency (FEMA)
- David L. Richardson, Virginia State Treasurer
- David P. Richardson (Pennsylvania politician) (1948–1995), member of the Pennsylvania House of Representatives
- David P. Richardson (New York politician) (1833–1904), U.S. Representative from New York
- David C. Richardson (Virginia politician) (1845–1928), Confederate soldier and mayor of Richmond, Virginia

== Sports ==
- David Richardson (American football) (born 1981), American football player
- David Richardson (bobsleigh) (born 1948), Canadian bobsledder
- David Richardson (figure skater) (born 1987), British figure skater
- Dave Richardson (South African cricketer) (born 1959), South African cricketer
- Dave Richardson (New Zealand cricketer) (born 1958), New Zealand cricketer
- Dave Richardson (footballer) (born 1932), English footballer (Grimsby Town)
- Dave Richardson (ice hockey) (1940–2022), Canadian ice hockey player
- Dave Richardson (darts player) (born 1979), Scottish-born Canadian darts player

== Entertainment ==
- David Richardson (audio engineer), English audio engineer and music producer
- David Richardson (actor) (born 1987), Australian television actor
- David Richardson (writer) (1955–2021), American television writer and producer
- David Richardson (editor), British-born Hong Kong film editor

== Other ==
- David H. S. Richardson, Canadian professor and lichenologist
- David J. Richardson, optical engineer, gave his name to the David Richardson Medal
- David Richardson (physicist) (born 1964), professor of photonics at the University of Southampton
- David Richardson (biochemist) (born 1964), British academic in biochemistry, Vice-Chancellor of the University of East Anglia
- David Richardson (priest) (born 1946), Australian Anglican priest and representative of the Archbishop of Canterbury to the Holy See, Rome
- David Richardson (American journalist) (1916–2005), American journalist
- David Richardson (Australian journalist), Australian journalist
- David Lester Richardson (1801–1865), professor of English
- David Mark Richardson (born 1958), South African ecologist
- David C. Richardson (admiral) (1914–2015), vice admiral in the U.S. Navy
- David Thomas Richardson (died 1808), officer of the Bengal Army and Hindu scholar
