= Phoenix (1804 EIC ship) =

United Kingdom
- Name: Phoenix
- Owner: Robert Williams
- Builder: Frances Barnard, Son & Roberts, Deptford
- Launched: 3 December 1804
- Fate: Broken up by 1821

General characteristics
- Tons burthen: 818, or 861, or 861 1/94 (bm)
- Length: Overall:145 ft 8 in (44.4 m); Keel:118 ft 2 1/4 in (36.0 m)
- Beam: 36 ft 1 in (11.0 m)
- Depth of hold: 13 ft 9 in (4.2 m)
- Complement: 101
- Armament: 20 × 18-pounder guns + 10 × 18-pounder carronades
- Notes: Three decks

Phoenix was launched in 1804 as an East Indiaman. She made six voyages for the British East India Company (EIC), between 1805 and 1819. In 1810 and 1811 she participated as a transport in two British military campaigns. She was broken up by 1821.

== EIC career ==
Phoenix may have been ordered as Princess Amelia, but renamed before launch.

EIC voyage #1 (1805-1807): Captain John Ramsden acquired a letter of marque on 31 December 1804. He sailed from Portsmouth on 8 March 1805, bound for St Helena and Bengal. Phoenix reached St Helena on 5 JUne and arrived at Diamond Harbour on 28 September. She was at Saugor on 29 October, stopped at Colombo on 20 December, and reached Bombay on 18 January 1806. She returned to Diamond Harbour on 31 March. Homeward bound, she was at Saugor on 14 July. She then stopped at Madras on 7 October and Trincomalee on 18 October. She reached the Cape of Good Hope on 30 December and St Helena on 23 January 1807. She arrived at The Downs on 12 April.

EIC voyage #2 (1808-1809): Captain Ramsden sailed from Portsmouth on 9 February 1808, bound for St Helena and Madras. Phoenix reached St Helena on 19 April, the Cape on 31 May, and Madras on 3 August. She then visited Masulipatam (21 August), and Coringa (31 August), before returning to Madras on 16 September. Homeward bound, Phoenix was part of a convoy that departed Madras on 25 October. HMS Albion provided the escort for the nine East Indiamen of the convoy. A gale commenced around 20 November at 10°S 90°E and by 22 November had dispersed the fleet. By 21 February three of the Indiamen — Lord Nelson, Glory, and Experiment had not arrived at Cape Town. Apparently all three had foundered without a trace.

Phoenix was at the Cape on 12 January 1809, reached St Helena on 24 [January], and arrived at The Downs on 23 May.

The Court of Directors of the EIC held an inquiry on this and another loss the next year. Ramsden reported that although he had survived a typhoon, the 20–23 November hurricane was the worst he had experienced. Phoenix was the last to see the missing vessels and all the captains of the surviving ships agreed that the missing vessels must have foundered from the violence of the hurricane.

EIC voyage #3 (1810-1812): Captain Ramsden sailed from Portsmouth on 13 April 1810, bound for Madras and Bengal. Phoenix was at São Tiago on 23 May and reached Madras on 28 August.

There the British government hired her as a transport for the Île de France (Mauritius). Phoenix was at Rodrigues on 6 November, and Mauritius on 29 November. The invasion took place on 3 December.

By 9 February Phoenix was back at 1811 Diamond Harbour. There the government again hired her, this time for the invasion of Java.

On 14 March Phoenix was at Saugor and by 4 May Malacca. She was in the 3rd division of transports, which sailed from Malacca on 14 June. By 5 July she was at Balambangan and by 4 August Batavia. She was back at Diamond Harbour on 19 October and Calcutta on 15 November. Homeward bound, she was at Saugor on 23 December and Madras on 8 February 1812. She reached St Helena on 11 May and arrived at The Downs on 21 July.

EIC voyage #4 (1814-1815): Captain John Pyke sailed from Portsmouth on 8 June 1814, bound for Bengal and Madras. Phoenix was at Madeira on 23 June and arrived at Saugor on 23 November. Homeward bound, she was at Madras on 16 February 1815, Colombo on 23 March, and the Cape on 31 May. She reached st Helena on 29 June and arrived at the Downs on 29 August.

EIC voyage #5 (1816-1817): Captain Pyke sailed from The Downs on 17 April 1816, bound for Madras and Bengal. Phoenix reached Madras on 28 July, Saugor on 28 August, Kidderpore on 7 September, and the New Anchorage on 19 October. Homeward bound, she was at Saugor on 17 December, the Cape on 17 February 1817, and St Helena on 8 March. She arrived at Blackwall on 7 May.

Captain Pyke died at his home in Dorset on 7 March 1818.

EIC voyage #6 (1818-1819): Captain Thomas White sailed from The Downs on 26 April 1818, bound for Madras and Bengal. She reached Madras on 18 August and arrived at Diamond Harbour on 29 August. Homeward bound, she was at the New Anchorage on 5 December, reached St Helena on 30 May 1819, and arrived at The Downs on 6 August.

== Fate ==
Phoenix never sailed again. On 25 September 1821 her register was cancelled, demolition being completed.
