= Earl Cornwallis (1783 ship) =

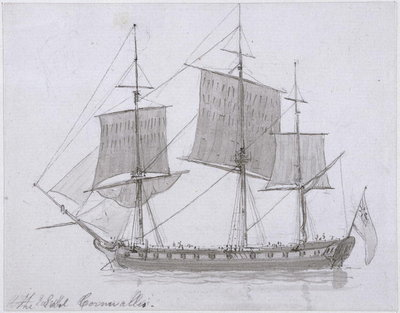
- The Earl Cornwallis, c.1786–94, Thomas Daniell; Yale Center for British Art, Paul Mellon Collection

History

United Kingdom
- Name: Fletcher
- Namesake: Earl Cornwallis
- Owner: EIC voyages 1–3: James Farquharson; EIC voyage 4: Robert Farquharson; EIC voyages 5–6: James Farquharson; EIC voyage 7: William Urquhart; Convict transport: Wilson & Co.
- Builder: John & William Wells, Rotherhithe
- Launched: 1783, or possibly 1782
- Renamed: Earl Cornwallis (before launch)
- Fate: No longer in 1809 Lloyd's Register or Register of Ships

General characteristics
- Tons burthen: 774, or 77449/94, or 784, or 800(bm)
- Length: Overall: 145 ft 6 in (44.3 m); Keel: 118 ft 7 in (36.1 m)
- Depth of hold: 14 ft 0 in (4.3 m)
- Complement: 1793:90 1798:64
- Armament: Indiaman: 26 guns; 1793: 26 × 4 & 9-pounder guns; 1798: 12 ×9-pounder guns + 6 × 18-pounder carronades

Earl Cornwallis was a three-decker East Indiaman launched in 1783 on the River Thames. She made seven voyages for the British East India Company (EIC). She then made one voyage transporting convicts from England to New South Wales. By 1809, she was no longer listed.

== East Indiaman ==
=== Voyage 1 (1784–85) ===
Captain Burnet Abercromby left the Downs on 31 March 1784, bound for Madras and Bengal. Earl Cornwallis reached False Bay on 26 July, and Madras on 7 October. She then arrived at Kedgeree on 17 November. On her return voyage to Britain she passed Saugor on 10 March 1785. She reached Port Louis, Isle de France on 16 May, and St Helena on 14 July. She arrived back at the Downs on 2 October.

=== Voyage 2 (1786–87) ===
Captain Thomas Hodgson left the Downs 4 March 1786, bound for China. Earl Cornwallis reached Whampoa on 21 August. For her return voyage she crossed the Second Bar on 22 December, and reached St Helena on 22 March 1787. She arrived back at the Downs on 22 May.

=== Voyage 3 (1788–89) ===
Hodgson was again Earl Cornwallis's captain and he left the Downs on 28 January 1788, bound for Madras and China. She arrived at Madeira on 20 February and Madras on 6 July. By 5 September she was at Malacca and by 9 October Whampoa. Homeward-bound, she crossed the Second Bar on 27 December. She reached St Helena on 1 May 1789, and the Downs on 9 July.

=== Voyage 4 (1791–92) ===
Hodgson left Portsmouth on 7 March 1791, again bound for Madras and China. Earl Cornwallis reached Madras on 19 June and Whampoa on 12 September. She crossed the Second Bar on 26 November, reached St Helena on 14 February 1792, and arrived at the Downs on 30 March.

=== Voyage 5 (1793–94) ===
By this time the French Revolutionary Wars had broken out, so Hodgson received a letter of marque on 29 June 1793. Earl Cornwallis then sailed from Portsmouth on 7 July, bound for Bengal. She reached the Cape on 19 September, and arrived at Diamond Harbour on 17 December.

On her way she captured a French brig bound from Negrais to Mauritius and sent her as prize to Vizagapatam. Because there was no Vice admiralty court there, she went on to Madras for condemnation by the Vice admiralty court there.-

The first advertisement for Hodgson's India Pale Ale appeared in the Calcutta Gazette in September 1793, shortly before the arrival of Earl Cornwallis. Whether the brewer George Hodgson was any relation of Thomas Hodgson is an open question.

Homeward-bound, Earl Cornwallis passed Saugor on 28 January 1794 and reached St Helena on 20 July. She then stopped at Galway Bay on 20 July before arriving at the Downs on 27 August.

=== Voyage 6 (1795–97) ===
Hodgson left Portsmouth on 24 May 1795, bound for China. Earl Cornwallis was at San Salvador on 7 July. She had sailed with a convoy of Indiamen that were bringing General Alured Clarke and his troops for the invasion of the Cape Colony. She sailed on 13 July, together with some other Indiamen such as Northumberland, and under the escort of Sphinx. However, Sphinx ran into Warren Hastings and both vessels returned to port, accompanied by Exeter.

The fleet, including Earl Cornwallis, reached Simon's Bay on 3 September and Earl Cornwallis reached False Bay on 1 October. Earl Cornwallis arrived at Whampoa on 7 March 1796. When she left, she crossed the Second Bar on 21 June, and her voyage ended on 13 February 1797.

=== Voyage 7 (1798–1800) ===
James Tennant was Earl Cornwallis's captain for her seventh and last voyage for the EIC. He received a letter of marque on 26 July 1798. He left Portsmouth on 4 October 1798, bound for Madras and Bengal. Earl Cornwallis reached the Cape on 20 January 1799 Cape and Madras on 12 April. She then visited Celyon on 11 May, before returning to Madras on 18 May. She arrived at Diamond Harbour on 30 May. She passed Saugor on 25 August, reached St Helena on 27 January 1800, and arrived at the Downs on 30 May. On this voyage she carried the 51st Regiment of Foot to Ceylon.

== Convict transport ==
In 1800 her owners sold Earl Cornwallis to Wilson & Co., who hired her out to carry convicts to Australia.

Under the command of James Tennent, Earl Cornwallis sailed from Portsmouth on 18 November 1800, and arrived at Port Jackson on 12 June 1801. She transported 193 male and 95 female convicts, of whom 27 male and eight female convicts died. All had died of dysentery, and many of the survivors were weak and feeble. One officer and 20 men of the New South Wales Corps provided guards.

Earl Cornwallis left Port Jackson on 4 October bound for India. She carried on board 150 tons of coal from Newcastle, New South Wales. This is believed to have been the first export of coal from Newcastle.

In June 1802, i.e., after the Treaty of Amiens she sailed to Île de France having on board a number of French prisoners, who had been detained in Bengal. The prisoners were under the charge of Mr. Campbell, who the Bengal Government had also charged with negotiating with the Governor of Île de France for the release of three vessels, Tay, Highland Chief, and Porcher, that the French privateer Bellone had captured just prior to the signing of the "Preliminaries of Peace". The vessels and their cargoes were estimated to be worth £100,000. Campbell was unsuccessful, at least with respect to Porcher.

== Subsequent career ==
It is not clear what Earl Cornwallis did subsequent to her mission to Île de France. Lloyd's Register carries Earl Cornwallis from 1800 to 1808 with the unchanged information of J. Tennent, master, Wilson & Co., owner, and trade: London to Botany Bay.
