= Canton (1790 EIC ship) =

British East Indiaman 1790–1829

History

United Kingdom
- Name: Canton
- Owner: EIC voyages 1-6:William Lushington; EIC voyages 7-8:John Mavor
- Operator: British East India Company
- Builder: Wells, Deptford
- Launched: 8 November 1790
- Out of service: 1829
- Fate: Broken up in 1898

General characteristics
- Tons burthen: 1198, or 1200, or 1209, or 120992/94, or 1210, or 1246 (bm)
- Length: Overall:165 ft 4 in (50.4 m); Keel:134 ft 2 3/4 in (40.9 m)
- Beam: 41 ft 2 in (12.5 m)
- Depth of hold: 17 ft 0 in (5.2 m)
- Sail plan: Full-rigged ship
- Complement: 1794:135; 1796:85; 1799:136; 1808:135; 1810:135
- Armament: 1794: 26 × 9&6-pounder guns; 1796:26 × 18&9-pounder guns; 1799:30 × 9&18-pounder guns; 1808:32 × 12&18-pounder guns; 1810:32 × 12&18-pounder guns
- Notes: Three decks

Canton was launched in 1790, as an East Indiaman. She made eight voyages for the British East India Company (EIC) between 1791 and 1811. She was sold and served for a while as a West Indiaman, transport, and storeship. Her hulk was sunk in 1829, to form a dry dock at Limehouse. She was finally broken up in 1898.

== Career ==
The EIC engaged Canton for six voyages, and then engaged her for an additional two voyages.

=== EIC voyage #1 (1791–1792) ===
Captain Thomas Bretrell sailed from The Downs on 27 January 1791, bound for Bombay and China. Canton reached Bombay on 23 May, and arrived at Whampoa Anchorage on 16 September. Homeward bound, she crossed the Second Bar on 23 November, reached St Helena on 2 March 1792, and arrived at Purfleet on 24 April.

=== EIC voyage #2 (1794–1795) ===
War with France had broken out before Canton's second voyage. Captain Thomas Bretrell acquired a letter of marque on 3 April 1794.

The British government held Canton at Portsmouth, together with a number of other Indiamen in anticipation of using them as transports for an attack on Île de France (Mauritius). It gave up the plan and released the vessels in May 1794. It paid £430 for having delayed her departure by 16 days.

Captain Betrell sailed from Portsmouth on 2 May 1794, bound for China. Canton arrived at Whampoa on 27 September. Homeward bound, she crossed the Second Bar on 26 November, reached St Helena on 15 April 1795, and arrived at Long Reach on 25 July.

=== EIC voyage #3 (1796–1798) ===
Captain Abel Vyvyan acquired a letter of marque on 11 February 1796. He sailed from Portsmouth on 12 April 1796, bound for St Helena, Madras, and China. Canton was at St Helena on 23 June, Madras on 1 September, Trincomalee on 24 October, and Colombo on 29 November.

She joined Alfred at Colombo and together they awaited the arrival of Boddam, Ocean, Taunton Castle, and Woodford, all of which had arrived by 9 December. They then set out together for Canton with Captain James Farquharson, of Alfred, the senior captain, as commodore of the fleet.

On 28 January 1797, the Indiamen had sailed through the Bali Strait in a squall and were off Java when they encountered six French frigates. Farquharson proceeded to organize a bluff. To give the impression that the convoy consisted of the powerful ships of the line that the Indiamen resembled, Farquharson ordered his ships to advance in line of battle. The French retreated, convinced they were facing a superior force. Actually, the French outgunned the East Indiamen both in terms of the number of guns and the weight of shot per gun.

The Indiamen sailed east and then up towards China. On 1 February, the Fleet encountered a strong gale with violent squalls and rain that wrecked Ocean. Canton arrived at Whampoa on 9 April 1797. The other four surviving vessels of the incident at the Bali Strait arrived that day or the day before.

Canton left Whampoa and crossed the Second Bar on 27 May. On 28 August, she was at Amoy, and she returned to Whampoa on 24 September. Captain Vyvyan died on 12 October. Canton's first officer was Ethelbert Lyne, and he assumed command. Finally homeward bound, Canton crossed the Second Bar on 26 February 1798, reached St Helena on 5 August, and arrived at Long Reach on 23 October.

=== EIC voyage #4 (1800–1801) ===
Captain Thomas Lushington acquired a letter of marque on 4 December 1799. He sailed from Portsmouth on 7 January 1800, bound for Bombay and China. Canton was at Johanna on 2 May, and reached Bombay on 26 May. She left Bombay on 17 August, and was at Malacca on 24 September, and Singapore on 1 October. She arrived at Whampoa on 5 November. Homeward bound, she crossed the Second Bar on 29 December, reached St Helena on 16 April 1801, and arrived at Long Reach on 17 June.

=== EIC voyage #5 (1802–1803) ===
Captain Thomas Lushington sailed from Portsmouth on 12 February 1802, bound for Bombay and China. Canton reached Bombay on 11 June, was at Malacca on 5 September, and arrived at Whampoa on 27 September. Homeward bound, she crossed the Second Bar on 9 December, reached St Helena on 31 March 1803, and arrived at Long Reach on 2 June.

=== EIC voyage #6 (1804–1805) ===
Captain Lushington sailed from Portsmouth on 20 March 1804, bound for Ceylon and China. Canton was one of a convoy of eight East Indiamen, all under escort by HMS Lapwing. Other East Indiamen in the convoy Marchioness of Exeter, Lord Nelson, Princess Charlotte, Marquis of Ely, Marquis Wellesley, Lady Jane Dundas, and Brunswick.

Canton reached Ceylon on 17 July. Four days later she was at Madras. She reached Penang on 27 August, and Malacca on 14 September, before she arrived at Whampoa on 15 October. Homeward bound, she crossed the Second Bar on 15 December, was at Lintin Island on 2 January 1805, and Penang on 21 January. She reached St Helena on 2 April, but apparently did not leave until 11 July. She then arrived at Long Reach on 15 September.

=== EIC voyage #7 (1808–1809) ===
Captain John Christopher Lochner acquired a letter of marque on 16 January 1808. He sailed from Portsmouth on 5 March 1808, bound for China. Canton was at the Cape on 31 May, Madras on 3 August, Penang on 22 August, and Malacca on 6 September. She arrived at Whampoa on 6 October. Homeward bound, she crossed the Second Bar on 2 February 1809, was at Penang on 1 April, reached St Helena on 11 July, and arrived at Long Reach on 14 September.

=== EIC voyage #8 (1810–1811) ===
Captain George Gray acquired a letter of marque on 22 March 1810. He sailed from Portsmouth on 28 April, bound for China. Canton was at Penang on 5 September and Malacca on 26 September, before she arrived at Whampoa on 10 December. Homeward bound, she crossed the Second Bar on 9 February 1811, reached St Helena on 11 July, and Carrig Roads on 18 September. She arrived at Northfleet on 29 September.

== Fate ==
In 1812 her owners sold Canton and she became a West Indiaman. Later she served as a transport and storeship until she was hulked.

In 1829, the hulk was sunk to serve as a dry dock at Limehouse. Joseph Fletcher, of the shipbuilders Fletcher, Son & Fearnall, sank Canton in the former mast pond. She was fastened with piles. Fletcher removed the decks, beams, and carlings, and replaced her stern with gates. Earth was placed around the hull with the result that she became an oak-lined dry dock of 220 ft (67 m) by 56 ft (17 m). The work was completed by 1833. Fletcher used the dock for steamboats and so had recesses built in to the side walls to accommodate paddles.

Canton was finally broken up in 1898.
