= Brunswick (1792 EIC ship) =

Merchant sailing ship of the British East India Company

History
- Name: Brunswick
- Owner: Thomas Newte (or Newre)
- Builder: Perry, Blackwall
- Launched: 18 September 1792
- Fate: Wrecked 1805

General characteristics
- Tons burthen: 1200, or 1244, or 1245 (bm)
- Length: Overall:153 ft 11 in (46.9 m); Keel:130 ft 0 in (39.6 m)
- Beam: 42 ft 0 in (12.8 m)
- Propulsion: Sail
- Complement: 1795:130; 1797:100; 1798:130; 1804:135
- Armament: 1795:34 × 9&12-pounder guns + 6 swivel guns; 1797:42 × 24&18&12&6-pounder guns; 1798:34 × 12&6-pounder guns; 1804:36 × 24&18&12-pounder guns
- Notes: Three decks

Brunswick was launched in 1792, as an East Indiaman for the British East India Company (EIC). She made five complete voyages for the EIC before the French captured her in 1805. Shortly thereafter she wrecked at the Cape of Good Hope.

== Career ==
=== EIC voyage #1 (1793–1794) ===
Captain Allen Cooper sailed from The Downs on 14 January 1793, bound for Bombay and China. Brunswick reached Bombay on 14 May, was at Malacca on 22 August, and arrived at Whampoa Anchorage on 17 September. Homeward bound, she crossed the Second Bar on 1 November, and reached St Helena on 12 April 1794. She was at Galway on 20 July, and arrived at The Downs on 27 August.

=== EIC voyage #2 (1795–1797) ===
War with France having broken out in 1793, Captain Thomas Palmer Acland acquired a letter of marque on 21 February 1795. He sailed from Portsmouth on 24 May 1795, bound for Bombay and China. Brunswick was at San Salvador on 7 July. She had sailed with a convoy of Indiamen that were bringing General Alured Clarke and his troops for the invasion of the Cape Colony. She sailed on 13 July, together with some other Indiamen such as Northumberland, and under the escort of Sphinx. However, Sphinx ran into Warren Hastings and both vessels returned to port, accompanied by Exeter.

The 14 vessels of the convoy arrived at Simon's Bay on 4 September, and at the Cape of Good Hope on 1 October. Many seamen of the Indiamen volunteered for duty on shore as soldiers or manning guns, some under Acland's command.

Brunswick reached Cochin on 21 December, and arrived at Bombay on 5 January 1796. She was at Mahim on 27 February, and back at Bombay on 16 March. She reached Malacca on 16 June, and arrived at Whampoa on 7 July. Homeward bound, she crossed the Second Bar on 11 November, was at Penang on 27 January 1797, and the Cape on 4 April. She reached St Helena on 29 April, and arrived at Long Reach on 28 July.

=== EIC voyage #3 (1798–1799) ===
Captain James Ludovic Grant acquired a letter of marque on 28 December 1797, and a second on 3 January 1798. He sailed from Portsmouth on 17 February 1798, bound for Bombay and China. Brunswick reached Bombay on 4 June, was at Malacca on 11 September, and arrived at Whampoa on 13 October. Homeward bound, she crossed the Second Bar on 21 December, reached St Helena on 17 May 1799, and arrived at Long Reach on 1 August.

=== EIC voyage #4 (1800–1801) ===
Captain Grant sailed from Portsmouth on 17 March 1800, bound for Madras and China. Brunswick reached Madras on 13 July. She was at Penang on 23 August, Malacca on 19 September, and arrived at Whampoa on 30 October. Homeward bound she crossed the Second Bar on 16 January 1801, reached St Helena on 15 April, and arrived at Long Reach on 17 June.

=== EIC voyage #5 (1802–1803) ===
Captain Philip Hughes sailed from The Downs on 29 March 1802, bound for China. Because he sailed during the Peace of Amiens, he did not acquire a letter of marque. Brunswick was at San Salvador on 10 May, and arrived at Whampoa on 7 September. Homeward bound, she crossed the Second Bar on 25 October, and reached St Helena on 14 February 1803. She left Saint Helena with a convoy on the 18th, and arrived at Long Reach on 25 April.

=== EIC voyage #6 (1804-capture) ===
Captain James Ludovic Grant acquired a letter of marque on 31 January 1804. One of her officers was midshipman Thomas Addison, who kept a journal of the voyage.

In February Brunswick took aboard Colonel Hatton and 350 officers and men of the 1st Battalion of the 66th Regiment of Foot to carry them to Ceylon.

Brunswick sailed from Portsmouth on 20 March 1804, bound for Ceylon and China. She was one of a convoy of eight East Indiamen, all under escort by HMS Lapwing. Other East Indiamen in the convoy Canton, Lord Nelson, Princess Charlotte, Marquis of Ely, Marquis Wellesley, Lady Jane Dundas, and Marchioness of Exeter. On 11 April, Lapwing left the convoy. Captain Grant, as senior EIC captain, became the Commodore of the East Indiamen.

On 23 June, the East Indiamen were in the Mozambique Channel when they encountered a French brig. Brunswick gave chase and after seven hours captured the brig Charlotte. She was armed with four guns and had a crew of 29 men under the command of Captain Maquette. She was 28 days out from Isle de France (Mauritius), with a cargo of old muskets and other goods that she was intending to trade for slaves. Two days later the British captains decided that Charlotte was not worth keeping, so they had the muskets thrown overboard and returned her to her captain and crew, who quickly sailed away.

Brunswick arrived at Trincomalee on 17 July. An officer from HMS Centurion came on board and pressed ten crew men. The next day the 66th Regiment disembarked and Brunswick lost three more crew members who deserted to join HMS Sheerness. Brunswick sailed and arrived at Madras Roads on 20 July. There an officer from HMS Wilhelmina came on board and pressed four seamen. Brunswick sailed for China on 13 August, as part of a convoy that included Canton and Marquis of Ely, and five country ships. HMS Grampus and Caroline provided an escort.

On 23 September, the convoy was off Pedro Branco. There it joined with several more vessels that formed a fleet of five warships (including the 74-gun HMS Russell), seven East Indiamen, and ten country ships. Brunswick anchored below the Second Bar on 12 October.

The next day she grounded on the Second Bar as she went up to Whampoa. Two other Indiamen grounded as well. Brunswick was gotten off on 14 October, and she arrived at Whampoa Reach on 19 October.

On 1 January 1805, Brunswick sailed through the Bocca Tigris. On 4 January, she arrived at Lintin Island. On 21 January, the fleet arrived at Penang.

Shortly after leaving Penang on 28 January, Brunswick became leaky and sailed to Bombay for repairs rather than going on to the Cape. At Bombay she underwent repairs while her cargo transshipped with two other homeward bound Indiamen, Experiment and Skelton Castle. By the time the repairs were done it was too late for Brunswick to sail back to England so the Bombay Government decided to have her sail back to China to pick up a new cargo.

Brunswick had had to draw on French prisoners of war at Bombay for the repair of her sails. (The Royal Navy had impressed more of her crew.) After the French had finished their work, but before she sailed, the French were put on the cartel Prime and sent to Île de France for exchange for British prisoners. Contre-Admiral Charles-Alexandre Durand Linois in his flagship Marengo intercepted Prime, distributing the prisoners between Marengo and the frigate Belle Poule, which was in company. They were cruising to raid British commerce, and from the former prisoners Linois learned of Brunswick's imminent departure and probable route.

Brunswick, Sarah, and the two country ships Cambrian and James Drummond, sailed from Bombay on 1 July 1805, bound for China. On 4 July, the two country ships separated and Brunswick and Sarah proceeded in company. On 11 July, they were off Point de Galle when they encountered Marengo and Belle Poule. Marengo quickly captured Brunswick.

Grant fired only one shot and then struck. Brunswick had perhaps 20 Europeans seamen in her crew, the Royal Navy having pressed at Bombay most of the crew she had brought out from England. The remainder of her crew were Chinese and lascars. The Chinese manned the guns with a European at each gun. The remainder and the lascars were on the upper deck for the general defense of the ship. Grant had no choice but to strike; it would have been wasteful with lives for an undermanned East Indiaman such as Brunswick to engage in combat with a 74-gun ship of the line.

Linois took Grant and most of his officers on to Marengo. He left her doctor to tend to the Chinese and lascars, and the fourth officer to command them, all under the oversight and control of a French prize crew.

At the same time as Marengo was taking control of Brunswick, Belle Poule set out to capture Sarah, which was further to windward. Captain C.C. M'Intosh sailed Sarah straight on to the shore north of Point de Galle. The French believed her totally lost and sailed off. Sarah's crew and cargo were saved. It is unclear whether she herself was later salved.

At the time of her capture, Brunswick had no EIC cargo on board.CITEREFHouse_of_Commons1830 A listing of prizes taken by Linois's squadron in the Indies describes Brunswick as an Indiaman of 1,100 tons (bm), with a cargo of cotton and sandalwood. It gave the value of her loss as 30,000 piastres. On 18 July, Brunswick and her prize crew parted.

On 7 August, Marengo and Belle Poule met a British convoy of Indiamen bound for Madras under the escort of HMS Blenheim, under the command of Rear-admiral Thomas Troubridge. An inconclusive engagement developed at 19°9′S 81°17′E. Linois could not risk damage to his vessels as repair would be difficult, and Troubridge didn't want to risk the Indiamen. Both sides broke off the engagement and Linois sailed to St Augustine's Bay, Madagascar, hoping to find Brunswick there. When he did not, he sailed on to the Cape.

== Loss ==
Marengo and Belle Poule arrived at the Simon's Bay on 29 August, or 13 September. There they awaited the arrival of Brunswick and Atalante. Brunswick arrived on 2 September, but a gale drove her on shore at Simon's Bay. Her wreck and cargo were sold for 3,500 rix dollars to an American captain that had arrived at the Cape.

== Post script ==
On 1 November, the 32 officers and crew from Brunswick went on board Eliza, an American ship under the command of Captain Chase. On the 18th they arrived at St Helena. There they boarded the frigate HMS Phaeton, Captain George Cockburn. (Note: Addison gives the name of the frigate as HMS Earl Howe, but there was no vessel by that name in the Royal Navy. He also gives the captain's name as Cockburn, who commanded Phaeton.) Phaeton was also carrying the Marquis of Wellesley and his suite, who was returning to England after having served as Governor General of India. They arrived at Spithead on 13 January 1806.

== See also ==
- Shipwrecks of Cape Town
