= David Lester Richardson =

Indian academic

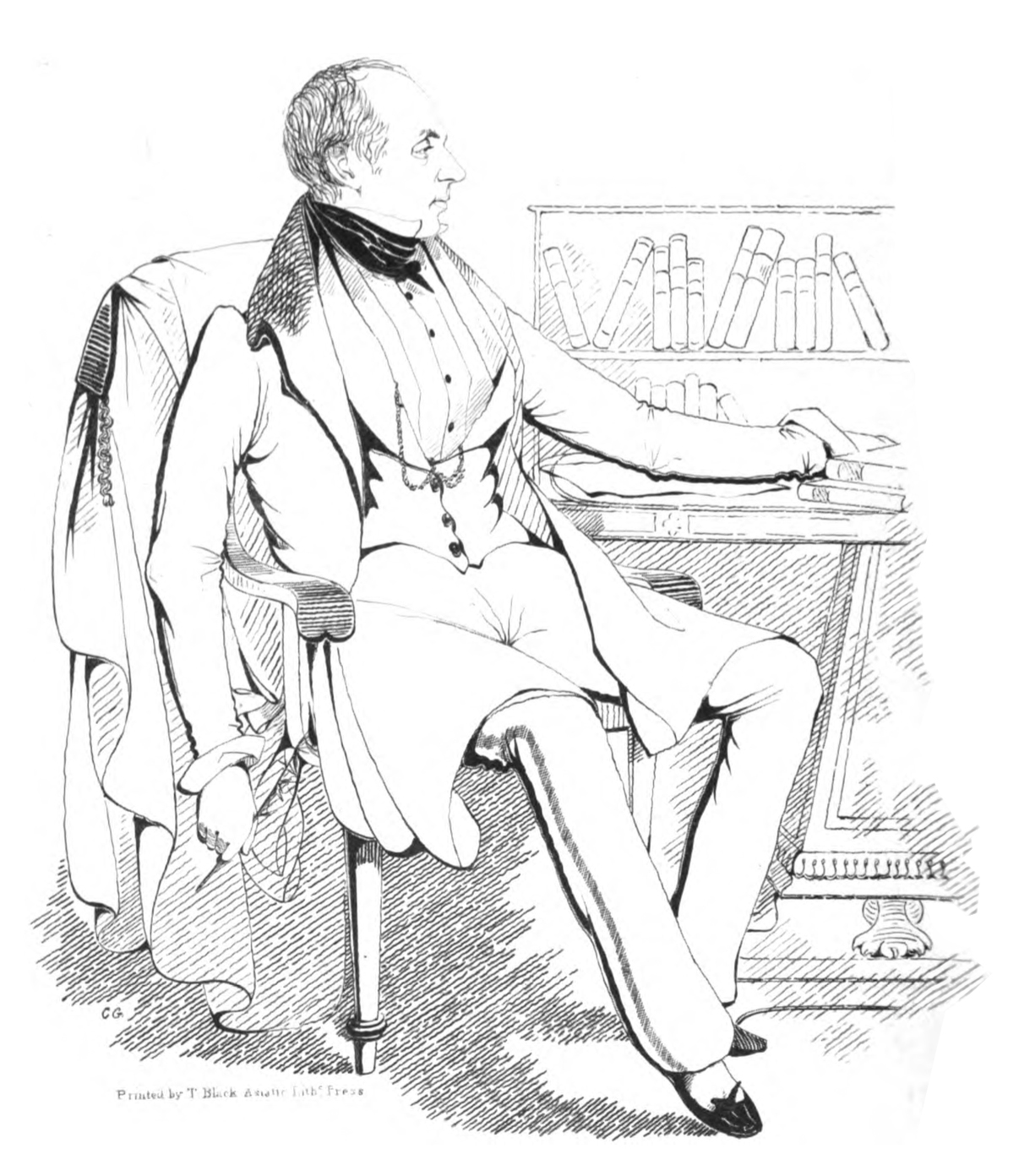
- Pen sketch of Richardson
- Born: 1801 Marylebone, London
- Died: 17 November 1865 (aged 63–64) Clapham, London
- Occupation: Poet, literary editor, educator

David Lester Richardson (1801 – 17 November 1865) was an officer of the East India Company, who throughout his life followed literary pursuits as a poet and periodical writer, and as editor and proprietor of literary journals. A skilled linguist, he was in later life an educator, serving as professor of English at Hindu College, where he inspired the Bengali poet Michael Madhusudan Dutta.

== Early life ==
David Lester Richardson was born in London and baptised at St. Marylebone on 15 February 1801, son of Sarah Lester and Lt Col David Thomas Richardson (1780–1808) of the Bengal Army. He appears to have been born out of wedlock; David Thomas Richardson married Violet Oliver (c1780–1808) in August 1801. He, Violet and their three surviving children died when their ship, the Lord Nelson was lost in a storm around 21 or 22 November 1808 en route from Madras to England.

== Career ==
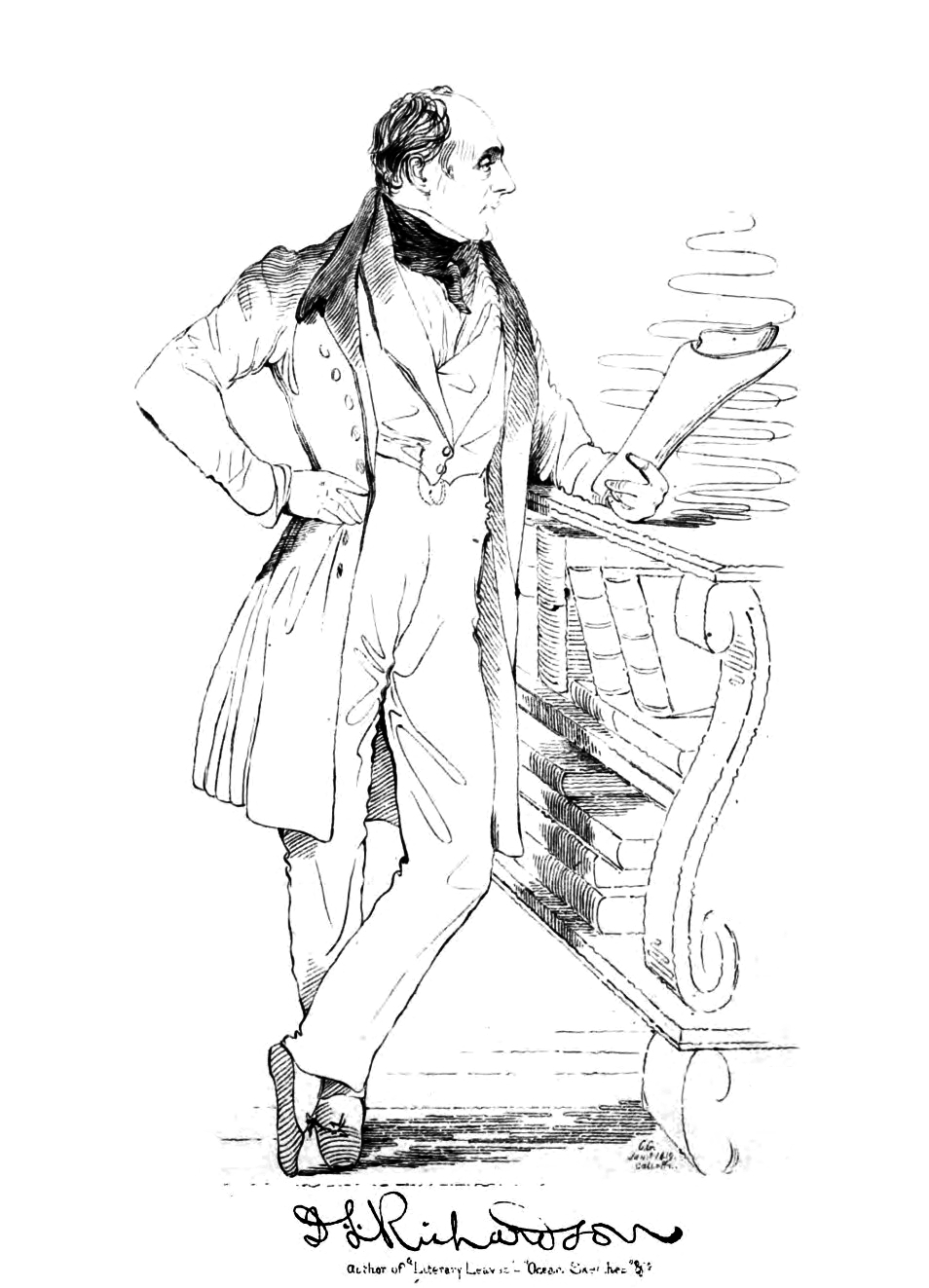
Sketch by Colesworthey Grant

Richardson entered into the service of the East India Company in 1819, and from that time began to submit poems to James Silk Buckingham's Calcutta Journal under initials which were to become well known in British India circles; D.L.R. His work included English language translations of Indian poems. He appears to have been wealthy; an uncle, Colonel Sherwood, is reported to have commented in connection with Richardson's aspiration to visit England, "You are the richest ensign in India. If you go home, you will return a beggar."

In 1822, he published a slim volume of poems under his full name - a work he was later ashamed of, presumably for its callow elements. He was granted medical leave to visit England in 1824; this first return trip to the mother-country lasted until 1829. In London he pursued his literary muse, publishing Sonnets and Other Poems in 1825, apparently to warm reviews. It was reprinted a number of times and a third edition was published in 1827 within the Jones Diamond Edition series on British Poets; Richardson was the only living poet to have his work included in the series.

In 1827, he founded the London Weekly Review, a literary journal which he edited with James Augustus St. John, and on which he expended a considerable amount of his patrimony. Contributors include William Hazlitt, William Roscoe, John Bowring and Thomas Pringle; the enterprise appears to have been successful, at least enough to encourage an offer from John Murray, scion of the John Murray publishing house to purchase a half-share in the business. The offer was rejected; but a downturn in publishing and hence in advertising revenue for literary journals, and a need on Richard's part to return to his employers in India led him to enter into an agreement under which Henry Colburn would assume control of the journal in return for Richardson receiving a share in the profits of sales of the London Weekly Review. Colburn ingeniously renamed the publication as the Court Journal, and Richardson's anticipated rewards evaporated.

Richardson's compulsion to return to India arose out of a statutory five-year limit on absence-from-post for officers of the East India company; he was by late 1828 at risk of overstaying. In October 1828 he applied to the company's Board of Control to return to India, and was instructed to embark in November; however his passage was delayed until December, causing him to arrive in India in 1829 later than agreed; for this he was suspended by the company for the next eighteen months, until the Board of Directors could rule on his future. Secure that they would find in his favour, Richardson once again threw himself into literary pursuits and in 1830 re-joined the company, being made a member of the Arsenal Committee in Calcutta, and shortly after promoted to captaincy.

His company status secure, Richardson immediately applied for and was granted a transfer to the invalid list. His time from 1829 to 1835 was for the most part spend editing journals, including seven volumes of the Bengal Annual, six volumes of the Calcutta Literary Gazette and twelve volumes of the Calcutta Magazine. In the same period he brought out two books of his poetry, Ocean, Sketches and Other Poems (1833) and Literary Leaves (1835), both regarded in 1839 as his principal works.

In the early part of 1835 he was appointed aide-de camp to Lord William Bentinck, the Governor-General of Bengal, but on Bentinck retiring from the post later in the year, Richardson was elected Professor of Literature at the Hindu College, apparently at the urging of Thomas Babington Macaulay; and at much the same time was commissioned by Macaulay and the Education Board to write a text-book - Selections from the British Poets... - to support his teaching, for which he was promised a subscription of 2,000 copies from the Board. In 1839 he was promoted to be principal of the Hindu College. In 1845 he became principal of Krishnagar College (though not its collegiate school), he became the first principal of Krishnagar Government College in 1846 and in 1848 principal of the Hindu Metropolitan College.

Macaulay would no doubt have been delighted that Shibnath Shastri wrote:

He was so effective and powerful as a teacher that his students came to believe firmly that there was no poet equal to Shakespeare and that English literature was best in the world.

Richardson retired from Indian service in 1861, and returned to England, where he became proprietor and editor of The Court Circular, and editor of Allen's Indian Mail. He died on 17 November 1865 at Clapham.

== Family ==
Richardson married Marian Scott (c1801–1865), daughter of Col Scott, in Danapur on 8 Jan 1821. They had four daughters and three sons:

- David Charles Thomas Richardson (1822–?), born in Danapur
- Lester Williams Richardson (1827–1835), born in St Pancras, died in Greenwich, Kent
- Jessy Hay Richardson (1831–1834), born and died in Singapore
- Isabella Caroline Richardson (1833–1903), born in Calcutta, married Rev John Reuben Hill (1838–1924) in Kanpur in 1872, died in Canterbury, Kent
- Violet Richardson (1837–1857), born in India, died in Chinsurah
- Marion Annie Richardson (1838–1914), born in Calcutta, married Adam Johnson (1838–1914) a Captain in HEICo Merchant fleet in Freemantle in 1859, died in South Australia.
- William Scott Richardson (1840–1894), born in Bengal, Captain in the 25th Kings Own Borderers, died in San Francisco.

After 1850 Richardson had three sons with Mary Elizabeth Selina Hobart de Joux (1823–1899), the widow of Thomas John Bell (1819–1847).

- Henry James Richardson (1851–1918), born in Middlesex, died in Chicago.
- Charles Gordon Richardson (1860–?), born in Middlesex, a metallurgical chemist who lived and worked in Canada and Chile.
- Arthur Styan Richardson (1862–1909), born in Lambeth, a wax figure sculptor, married Frances Mae Stewart (1872–1949) Essex, Ontario in 1892, died in Ontario.

After Richardson's death in 1865, Mary Elizabeth married again to William Hubble (1820–?).

== Masonic life ==
Richardson was an active Freemason, belonging to Lodge of Industry and Perseverance No. 126 in Calcutta. He is remembered for authoring one of the most beloved poems in Masonic culture, The Final Toast, noted for the well-known lines 'Happy to meet, Sorry to part, Happy to meet again', is generally given at the conclusion of Masonic dinners and immediately before the Tyler's Toast.

== Works ==
Works of Richardson, apart from his contributions to and editorial of literary journals, include:

- Miscellaneous Poems, Calcutta (1822)
- Sonnets and Other Poems London (1825)
  - reprinted as Sonnets and Miscellaneous Poems, partly written in India as part of the Jones's Diamond Poets series, London (1827)
  - reprinted under the same title as part of the Jones's Cabinet of the British Poets series, London (1837)
- Ocean, Sketches and Other Poems, Calcutta (1833)
- Literary Leaves, Calcutta (1835)
  - volume I
  - volume II
- Selections from the British Poets, from the time of Chaucer to the Present Day, with Biographical and Critical Notices, Calcutta (1840)
- The Anglo-Indian Passage, London (1845)
- Literary Chit-chat, with Miscellaneous Poems, Calcutta (1848)
- Literary Recreations, London (Calcutta printed, 1852)
- Flowers and Flower Gardens, with an Appendix … respecting the Anglo-Indian Flower Garden, Calcutta (1855)

According to Samuel Austin Allibone in A critical dictionary of English literature and British and American authors (1859–71), he also published:

- Trials and Triumphs
- Lord Bacon's Essays, annotated
- History of the Black Hole of Calcutta (1856)

These may be mistaken; a Trials and Triumphs was published in 1834 by Daniel Richardson. A Lord Bacon's Essays, annotated unconnected with Richardson was published in 1856. A number of bibliographies do note Richardson, D. L. History of the Fall of the Old Fort of Calcutta and the Calamity of the Black Hole, (1856).

== See also ==
- Catherine Eliza Richardson, David Lester Richardson's aunt by her marriage to his father's brother, G. G. Richardson, whose verse was published in the London Weekly Review and who was encouraged by David Lester Richardson to publish a collection of her poems.
