= Princess Charlotte (1796 EIC ship) =

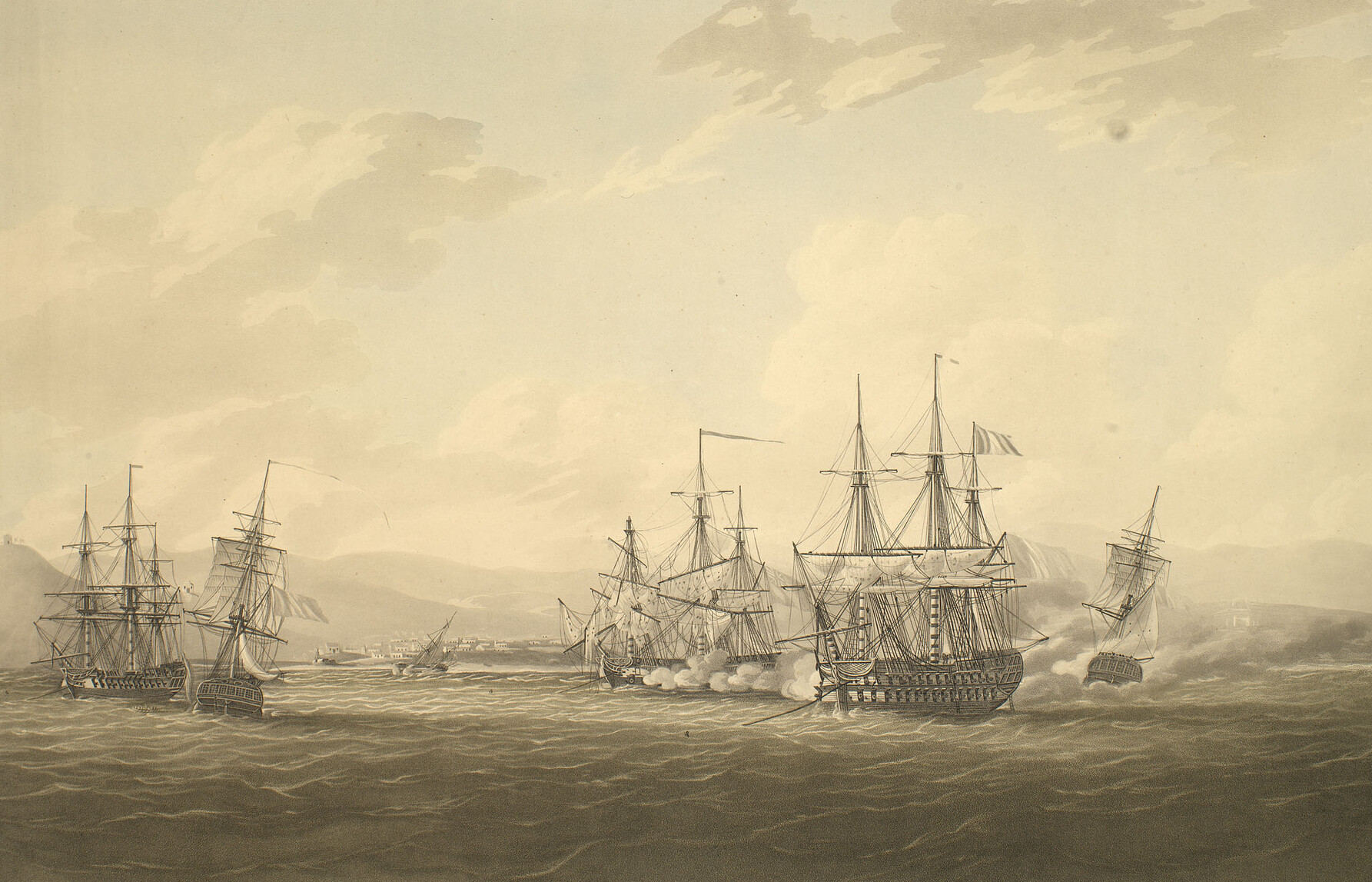
- Princess Charlotte at the Battle of Visakhapatnam

History

British East India Company
- Name: Princess Charlotte
- Namesake: Princess Charlotte of Wales
- Owner: Voyage 1, 2 & 3: Peter Everitt Mestaer; Voyage 4: James Loughnan
- Builder: Peter Everitt Mestaer, King and Queen Shipyard, Rotherhithe
- Launched: 24 February 1796
- Fate: Captured 1804

General characteristics
- Type: East Indiaman
- Tons burthen: 610, 61037/94 or 625 (bm) (bm)
- Length: 127 ft 1 in (38.7 m) (overall); 102 ft 0 in (31.1 m) (keel)
- Beam: 33 ft 6 1/2 in (10.2 m)
- Depth of hold: 12 ft 6 in (3.8 m)
- Sail plan: Full-rigged ship
- Complement: 75 men
- Armament: Voyages 1&2: 30 × 4- & 6-pounder guns; Voyage 2 as EIC cruiser: 38 × 12-pounder guns; Voyage 3: 30 × 12- & 18-pounder guns; Voyage 4: 24 × 6- & 9-pounder guns

Princess Charlotte was an "extra ship’’ of the British East India Company (EIC), launched in 1796. She made four voyages for the EIC. On her second voyage she suffered a short-lived mutiny. She then spent almost a year as an armed ship in the service of the EIC, including a voyage to the Red Sea. A squadron of the French Navy captured her at the Battle of Visakhapatnam in 1804, on her fourth voyage.

== Voyages ==
Because she sailed during the Napoleonic Wars, she sailed under letters of marque issued separately for each captain. These authorized her masters to engage in offensive action against the French, and not just defend themselves; that they were allowed to do without a letter.

=== Voyage #1 (1796-97) ===
Princess Charlotte , under the command of Captain Charles Elton Prescott, left Portsmouth on 27 June 1796. Prescott’s letter of marque was dated 16 April 1796. She reached Cape Town on 20 September, and Madras on 9 January 1797. For the return trip she reached Trincomalee on 11 April, Cape Town on 6 July, St Helena on 2 August, and she reached the Downs on 24 October.

=== Voyage #2 (1798-1800) ===
Charles Elton Prescott was again her captain when she left Portsmouth on 24 March 1798. She was carrying as passengers 22 gentleman, five ladies, 15 women and children, and 51 soldiers of the 12th Regiment of Foot, who had had to leave their officer behind at Portsmouth as he was unfit to travel. She reached Cape Town on 30 May, and stayed there for almost six weeks. The reason was that a mutiny had broken out that day that Prescott and the officers had quickly subdued. Because the whole crew was involved, Prescott anchored in Simons Bay next to the 64-gun, third-rate ship of the line Sceptre, whose marines rowed guard around her that night. Prescott called for a court-martial, but legal issues resulted in some delays. Eventually the three ringleaders (quartermaster and two boatswain's mates) were found guilty and sentenced to hang, a sentence commuted to 18-months imprisonment.

She reached Madras on 18 August, and Calcutta on 26 September. The EIC then decided to use Princess Charlotte as an armed ship from December 1798, until November 1799. Princess Charlotte was to serve as a cruiser on the Malabar Coast and into the Red Sea. She left Saugor on 14 December. On 6 January, she and Earl Howe received orders from the third rate ship of the line HMS Victorious to cruise between the Palmyra Rocks and Pigeon Island. Prescott and his officers received commissions from the government for the duration of their service. By 31 January, she was in Goa and by 19 February, Bombay. The government in Bombay armed her with thirty-eight 12-pounder guns and embarked 176 men from the European Regiment to serve as marines.

She served under the command of Rear Admiral John Blankett, who sent her and Fox to the Red Sea to cut the French in Egypt off from India and to prevent them from supporting the Kingdom of Mysore against the British. She delivered 54 men from the 84th Regiment of Foot and 55 men from the EIC artillery to Babelmandel Island. She sailed to Mokha, where she arrived 1 May. Six days later she was at Babelmandel, then Mokha on 2 June, Babelmandel on 16 June, Bombay by 18 September, and Diamond Harbour by 25 December.

Lord Mornington and the Bengal Government awarded Prescott with a gratuity of £1000 for his services. The Board of Directors of the EIC further rewarded him with a grant of £2000. They bestowed proportionate grants to Princess Charlotte's other officers and seamen.

Released from her military duties, Princess Charlotte returned to Britain. She passed Saugor on 5 January 1800, reached Cape Town on 25 April, St Helena on 7 June, and the Downs on 23 September.

=== Voyage #3 (1801-1803) ===
For her third voyage, Princess Charlotte was under the command of Captain Benjamin Richardson. Richardson’s letter of marque was dated 2 April 1801. She left Portsmouth on 23 April 1801, and reached Madras on 11 August. From there she sailed to Penang, which she reached by 8 December. By 17 January 1802, she was at Amboina. She left Timor on 20 June, reaching St Helena on 29 August. She then sailed to the River Shannon, where she arrived on 17 November, before arriving at the Downs on 1 January 1803.

=== Voyage #4 (1804 & loss) ===
Captain John Logan acquired letter of marque on 23 January 1804. He sailed Princess Charlotte from Portsmouth on 20 March 1804. Princess Charlotte was one of a convoy of eight East Indiamen, all under escort by HMS Lapwing. The other East Indiamen in the convoy were Marchioness of Exeter, Canton, Lord Nelson, Marquis of Ely, Marquis Wellesley, Lady Jane Dundas, and Brunswick. Princess Charlotte and the East Indiaman Barnaby were in the Visakhapatnam roadstead on 18 September, and under escort by Centurion when a squadron under Counter-admiral Charles-Alexandre Léon Durand Linois, in the 74-gun Marengo, arrived.

Centurion held off the French, who withdrew even though they had crippled her. During the encounter, Barnaby's captain ran her ashore to avoid capture, wrecking her. Logan ignored signals from Centurion to add Princess Charlotte's broadside to the combat. He also ignored subsequent signals to run ashore to avoid capture. Instead, Logan surrendered without firing a shot. The French frigate Sémillante took possession of Princess Charlotte and the French took her with them to Mauritius as they withdrew. Because Princess Charlotte had not loaded for her homeward voyage, the EIC reported that it had not lost any cargo. The French took her to Mauritius.

On 3 September 1806, the former Princess Charlotte was at Port Louis, Île de France. She was sailing between Île de France and Madagascar carrying slaves and cattle.

== Post-script ==
John Logan would captain other Indiamen for the EIC. He was captain of the Indiaman Experiment, which with two other Indiamen in the home-bound convoy, disappeared on 28 October 1808, during a gale off Mauritius.
