= David Thomas Richardson =

David Thomas Richardson (died 1808) was a Bengal Army officer and scholar who established the East India Company's staff training college at Barasat, but who died with his family when, returning to England from India, their ship, the Lord Nelson was lost in a hurricane in 1808.

== Early career ==
David Thomas Richardson was born to a Scottish borders family in Langholm, Dumfriesshire, one of eleven children. In 1779 he became an East India Company cadet, later serving under Colonel (later General) Thomas Wyndham Goddard in the 5th battalion of Sepoys, during the First Anglo-Maratha War; thereafter he transferred to the 3rd Bengal European Regiment. He was one of a number of his family to serve in the east; his brother Gilbert was captain of an East Indiaman and married Catherine Eliza Richardson; his brother William served in the Second Anglo-Mysore War, but was captured and murdered by poison on the orders of Tipu Sultan. Two of his sisters married fellow officers.

== Abu Taleb's visit to England ==
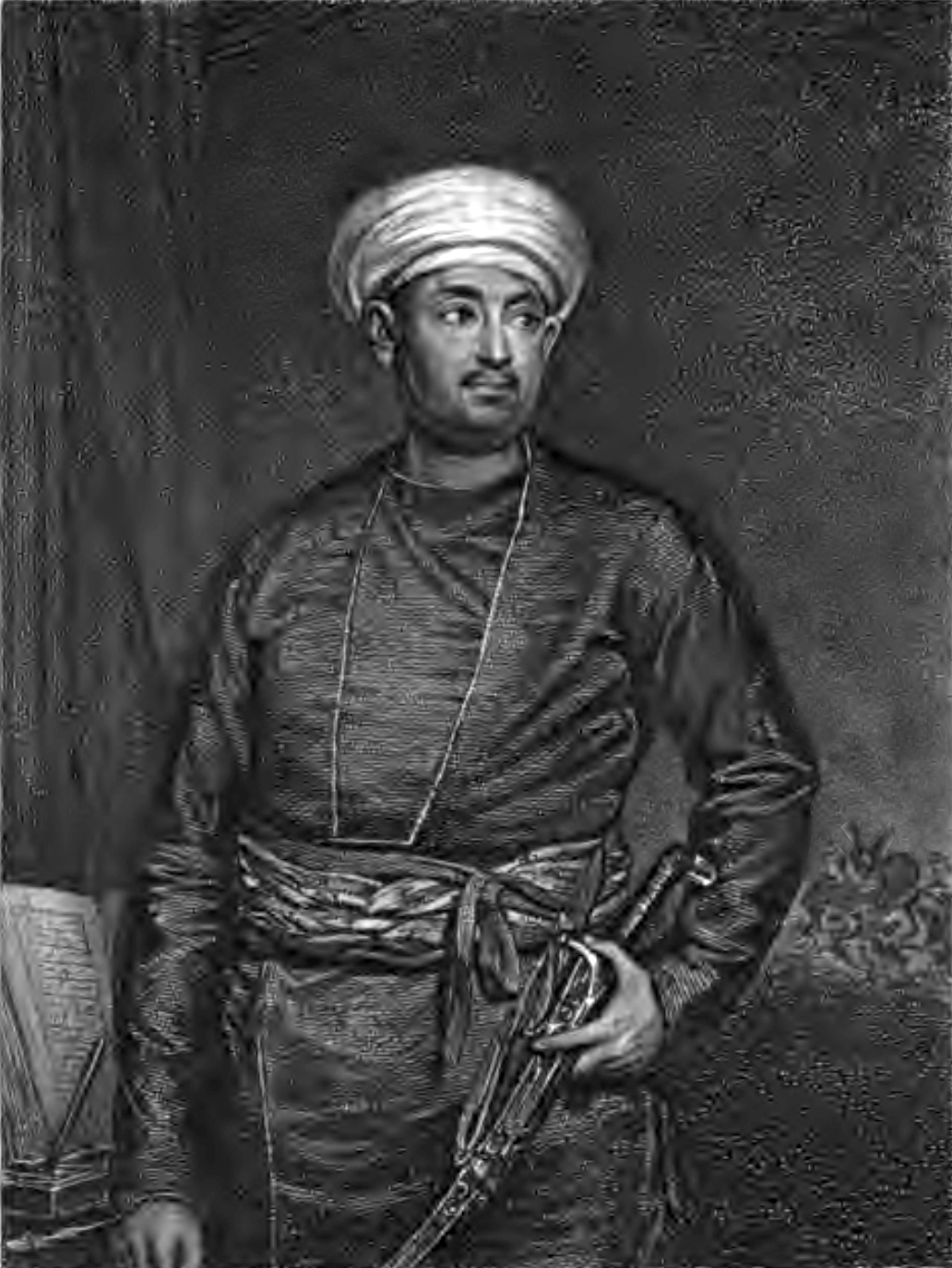
Engraving of Mirza Abu Taleb Khan, who travelled to England on Richardson's invitation

Richardson appears to have been transferred to military intelligence work, arising out of his knowledge of Persian and Hindustani; he is noted, later in his career, as a language examiner for the company's staff training college. In this context, he is notable as the apparent instigator of, and companion on, a trip to Europe made between 1799 and 1802 by Mirza Abu Taleb Khan, a tax-collector and Persian scholar associated with Oudh State during a period in which the company was increasing its control of that territory. It appears that Abu Taleb, who had had to exile himself from Oudh after being too closely identified with British interests, may have been sponsored by the company to make his trip, presumably with a view to retaining his utility for later company uses in Oudh. Certainly, it appears somewhat singular that an officer of the company would invite a local to accompany him to England, but that, nevertheless, happened. Singular too was that Abu Taleb published a travel-book recounting his journey, in circa 1805, Masir Talib fi Bilad Afranji (The Travels of Taleb in the Regions of Europe), which was translated and reprinted - including by the East India Company - as Travels of Mirza Abu Taleb Khan in Asia, Africa and Europe.

Richardson and Abu Taleb departed Calcutta in November 1799, by Abu Taleb's account, travelling first to Cape Town where they entered into local society notably being entertained by Lady Anne Barnard, who asserted their intelligence function in a letter to Charles Cornwallis, 1st Marquess Cornwallis. They next travelled to Dublin, where Richardson went ahead to London, leaving Abu Taleb to travel independently.

Richardson's time in England seems to have been busy; he contrived to impregnate one Sarah Lester, and a son David Lester Richardson is recorded as being baptised at St. Marylebone on 15 February 1801. Yet in 1800 Richardson becomes engaged to one Violet Oliver (1780–1808) of Liddle Bank near Langholm, and August 1800 they were married.

== India again ==
The couple are recorded as arriving back in India by May 1801, Richardson having used his relationship with General Harris to seek appropriate employment by the company. He served as an occasional external examiner in languages at the company's staff college in Fort William, and established and acted as principal of a new staff college at Barasat from 1802; he is recorded as compiling a Hindustani dictionary, but that never saw publication; and there are occasional references to translations of Indian verse by Richardson in the Calcutta literary journals.

Richardson is known to have moved around India between 1801 and 1807, with five children born in three different locations; Willasey-Wilsey speculates that this was in connection with intelligence work. He was promoted from Major to Lieutenant-Colonel in 1805.

== Departure for England ==
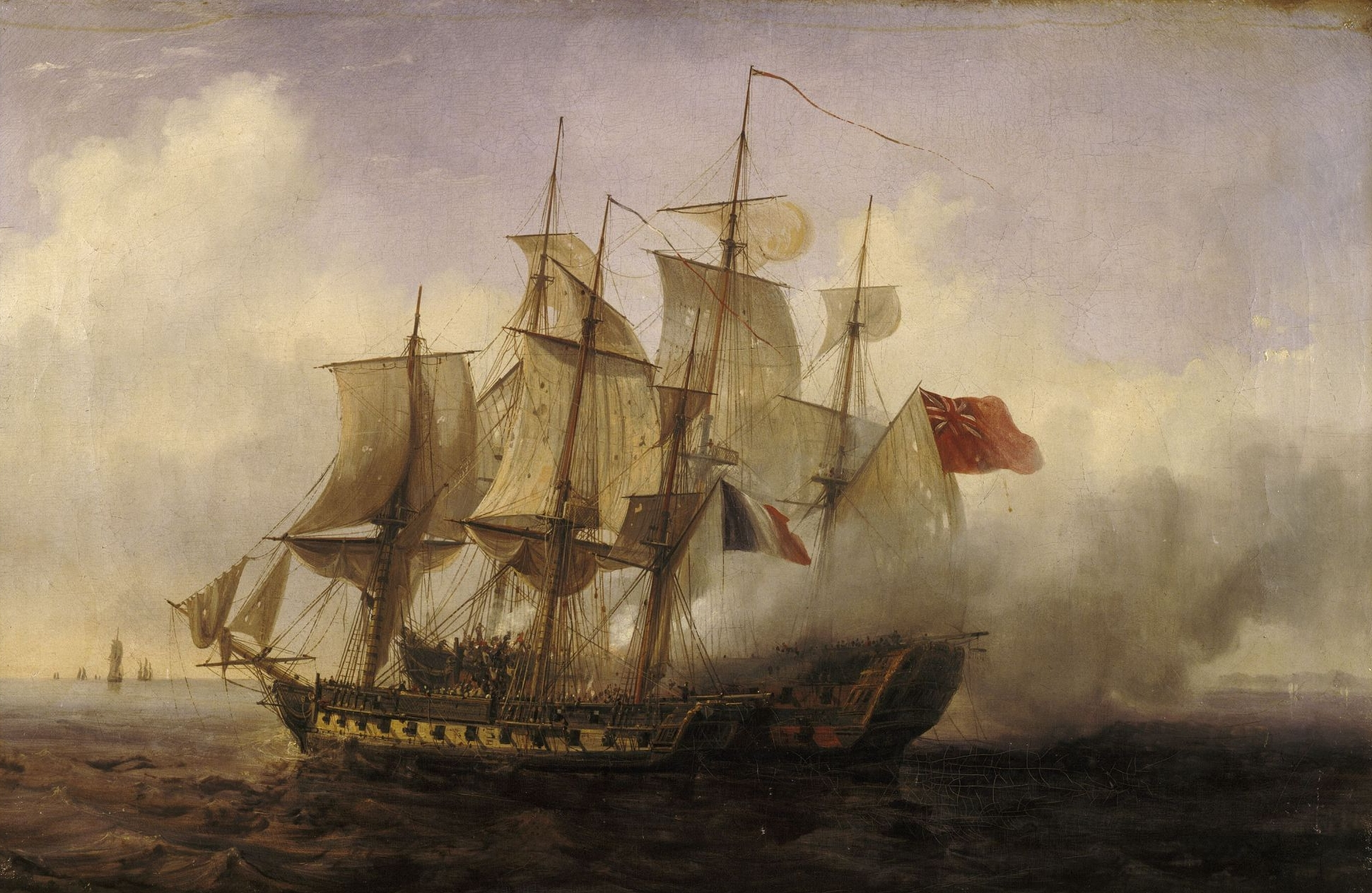
Lord Nelson, earlier in its career, being captured by Bellone

By 1808, after 30 years of Indian service, Richardson determined to return to England, retiring on 29 September 1808 departing Madras on 26 October on Lord Nelson. A month later, on the 20 November, the fleet with which Lord Nelson was sailing was hit by a hurricane; by the 21 November at around 8°30′S 80°0′E the fleet had been scattered; Lord Nelson and two other East Indiamen, Glory and Experiment, also disappeared without a trace. Richardson, Violet and their three surviving children were lost.

The Richardsons are commemorated in a now ruined mausoleum near Dinlabyre; Catherine Eliza Richardson, who was married to David Thomas's brother Gilbert (who died in 1801), reflected on the loss in one of her poems.

== Notes ==
Violet was the daughter of Jane née Rutherfurd (c1755–1820) and William Oliver of Dinlabyre (1738–1830), Sheriff-Depute of Roxburgh
