= Catherine Eliza Richardson =

Scottish author and poet (1777–1853)

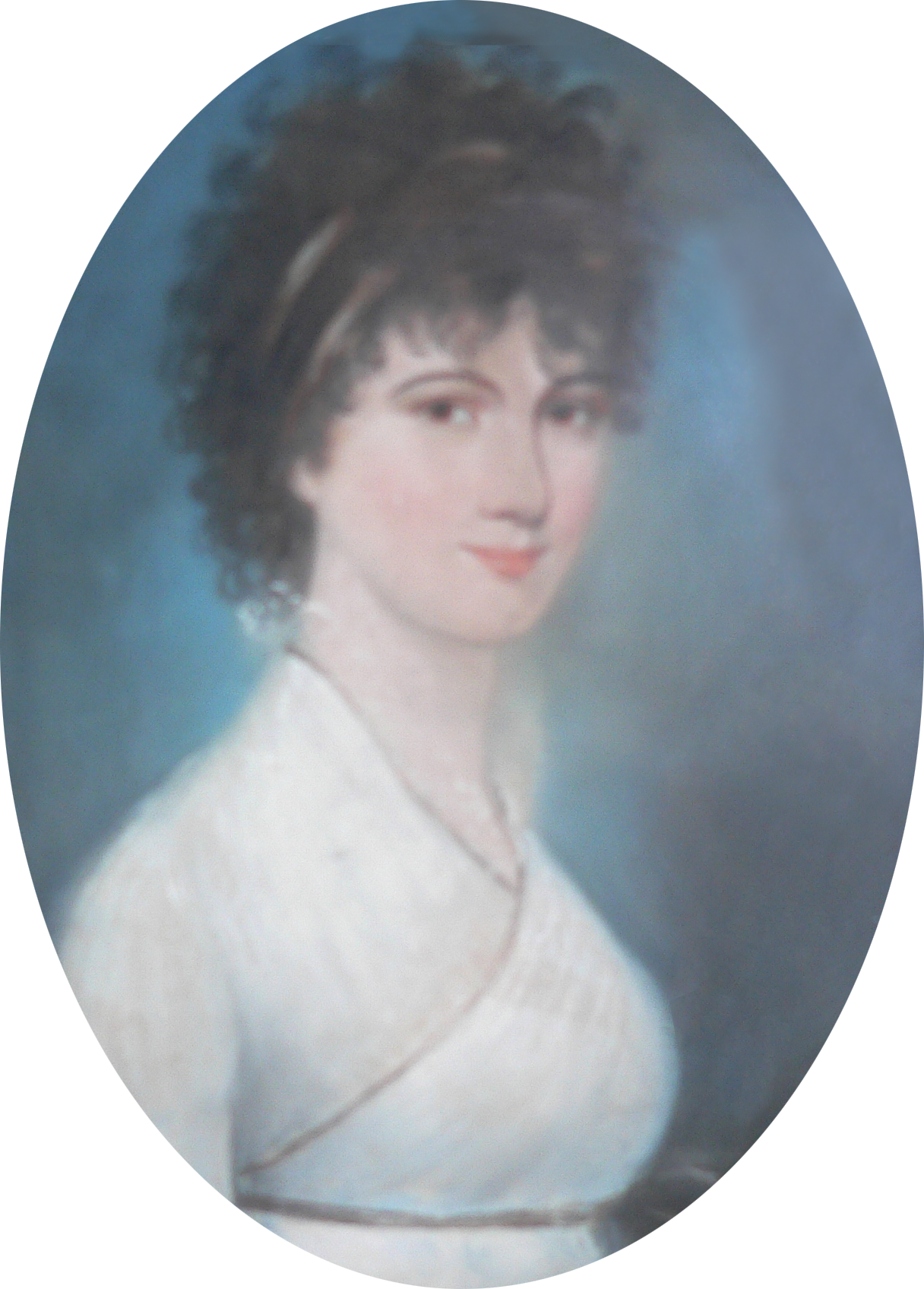
- Portrait of Catherine Eliza Richardson
- Born: 24 November 1777; Canonbie, Dumfriesshire, Scotland
- Died: 9 October 1853 (aged 75); Canonbie, Dumfriesshire, Scotland
- Occupation: Novelist
- Spouse: Gilbert Geddes Richardson (m. 1799)
- Children: 5

Catherine Eliza Richardson (née Scott 24 November 1777 – 9 October 1853; often called Caroline Eliza Richardson, (Note: A blog post for a University of Victoria English class, citing birth and baptism registries, suggests that her given name was Catherine not Caroline, and asserts the use of the latter rests on a mistake made by Mrs. MacArthur, a relative, who supplied the biography used in The Scottish Minstrel and relied upon by subsequent biographers. Richardson's published work was anonymous, initialled (C.E.R.; C.E.; or R.), or as Mrs. G. G. Richardson. Scottish Women Poets - Mrs. G. G. Richardson (1777-1853). The ODNB concurs in its use of Catherine.) and published as Mrs. G. G. Richardson) was a Scottish author and poet who published a four-volume novel and three collections of verse.

== Biography ==
Catherine Eliza Richardson was born in 1777 to Phoebe Scott (née Dixon) and James Scott, a landowner of considerable property and Justice of the peace in the Scottish borders village of Canonbie, Dumfriesshire. She is described being 'born into favourable circumstances' as one of a 'numerous family of brothers and sisters', of 'educated and intellectual' parents.

Her childhood was spent in the borders, but in 1799 she travelled to India, where on 29 April at Fort George, Madras she married her cousin Gilbert Geddes Richardson, a mariner, captain of an East Indiaman and partner in a trading house, Colt, Baker, Hart & Co. Her connection with India is specified as her uncle, 'General, afterwards Lord Harris'. (Note: George Harris, 1st Baron Harris fits the description of a General, later elevated to the peerage, active in Madras in 1799, but his connection with the Scottish Richardson family is unclear.)

She quickly had five children with Gilbert; he is recorded as having died on 30 August 1805. She returned from India to Canonbie to raise her young children, but moved to London during their teenage years, returning once more to Canonbie in 1821, where she remained until her death on 9 October 1853. (Note: Jackson in the ODNB specifies that she returned to England with three of her children; Mrs. MacArthur specifies she had five children, all of whom survived her.)

Richardson was an intimate of Thomas Carlyle, who in his Reminiscences remarks on her as 'poor and hospitable Mrs. Richardson, once a "novelist" of mark, much of a gentlewoman and loved by us both.'

== Works ==
Richardson's first-published work is thought to be the 1801 four-volume novel Adonia - A Desultory Story; her authorship rests on strong circumstantial evidence - the published volumes omits the author's name. (Note: Mrs. MacArthur suggests that Richardson wrote a three-volume novel, Adonia in the 1820s or 1830s; Frank Miller's The poets of Dumfriesshire (1910) repeats this assertion.)

She published poems in a short-lived London Weekly Review (LWR) periodical edited by David Lester Richardson in the 1827-29 period, and he is supposed to have encouraged her to publish collections on her own account. Henry Colburn's The New Monthly Magazine, in a review of Poems, speculated that the two were related; David Richardson was an East India Company officer, on furlough to the UK during the LWR period.

In 1828 she published a first collection, Poems, by private subscription running to 1,700 copies. It was reviewed with considerable scorn in The Edinburgh Literary Journal: 'How Mrs. G. G. Richardson took it into her head to publish a volume of "Poems" is a good deal more than we can understand...'; and more blandly in The Athenaeum as a work of 'chasteness ... of thought and language, pleasing and appropriate similes, natural metaphors and very gentle pathos ... [with] a vein of melancholy running through the whole.' Poems was reprinted in 1828 and a third edition published in 1829; a review of the third in The Imperial Magazine remarked on the number of reprints. It characterised the subject-matter as 'local, circumscribed and domestic' and 'not of the highest order', but found that 'excellencies of a more exalted order occasionally burst upon us', which 'compensate for obvious deficiencies' and render the work 'in an unquestionably respectable light.

Richardson next published Poems: Second Series in 1834. A review in The Metropolitan found them 'above the common-place' and 'with considerable humour', but 'unequal within themselves', having blemishes or faults which detract from first impressions. The New Monthly Magazine received the second series with high praise: 'full of poetic gems' each without exception showing 'evidence of an elegant and highly cultivated mind'. A third set of poems, Grandmamma's Sampler; with some other Rhymes for Children was published in 1836.

Chambers's Journal commented in 1876 that Richardson was in the class of 'forgotten or little known poets', and opines that her work 'is not characterised by striking originality of thought', but 'clear and pure, sometimes sparking, more frequently soft and gentle'. The article notes that she continued to write poetry during the latter years of her life, as well as stories, some of which were published.

=== Summary of works ===
- Adonia (1801)
  - Volume I
  - Volume II
  - Volume III
  - Volume IV
- Poems (1828)
- Poems: Second Series (1834)
- Grandmamma's Sampler; with some other Rhymes for Children (1836)
