= Experiment (1802 EIC ship) =

History

United Kingdom
- Name: Experiment
- Owner: Voyages 1 &2: Robert Taylor; Voyage 3: George Fraser; Voyage 4: James Loughnan
- Builder: Wells, Blackwall,
- Launched: 29 October 1802
- Fate: Disappeared November 1808

General characteristics
- Tons burthen: 549, or 54920/94, or 610 (bm)
- Length: 124 ft 10 1/2 in (38.1 m) (overall); 99 ft 9 1/2 in (30.4 m) (keel)
- Beam: 32 ft 2 in (9.8 m)
- Depth of hold: 16 ft 0 in (4.9 m)
- Propulsion: Sail
- Complement: 1803:55; 1804:55; 1806:50; 1807:60
- Armament: 1803:18 × 12-pounder guns; 1804:18 × 12-pounder guns; 1806:18 × 12-pounder guns; 1807:18 × 9-pounder guns
- Notes: Two decks

Experiment was launched in 1802 and was immediately taken up by the British East India Company (EIC), as an "extra ship" on a multi-voyage charter. She made three voyages for the EIC and disappeared without a trace while homeward bound on her fourth voyage in the same storm that claimed two other East Indiamen.

== Career ==
EIC voyage #1 (1803-1804): Captain James Carnegie acquired a letter of marque on 15 October 1803. He sailed from the Downs on 10 February 1803, bound for Bombay. Experiment reached Johanna on 13 May and arrived at Bombay on 7 June. Homeward bound, she reached St Helena on 14 November and Cork on 18 January 1804, before arriving at Blackwall on 15 February.

EIC voyage #2 (1804-1805): Captain Peter Campbell acquired a letter of marque on 4 May 1804. He sailed from Portsmouth on 9 June 1804. Experiment reached Madeira on 5 July and arrived at Bombay on 11 December.

At Bombay Experiment took on part of a cargo of tea that Brunswick had brought. Brunswick had had to put into Bombay for repairs while homeward bound from China. The EIC's Court of Directors decided to transship her cargo and send her back to China after the repairs had been completed.

On her homeward journey Experiment reached Tellicherry on 23 February 1805, Anjengo on 6 March, and St Helena on 23 June. She arrived at Blackwall on 18 September.

EIC voyage #3 (1806-1807): Captain James Normand acquired a letter of marque on 26 March 1806. He sailed from Portsmouth on 14 May 1806, bound for Bombay. Experiment reached False Bay on 6 August and arrived at Bombay on 6 October. Homeward bound, she was at the Cape of Good Hope on 16 February 1807 and St Helena on 9 March, and arrived at the Downs on 28 May.

EIC voyage #4 (1807-Loss): Captain John Logan acquired a letter of marque on 21 August 1807. He sailed from Portsmouth on 17 September 1807, bound for Madras and Bengal. The homeward bound fleet left Bengal on 25 October 1808. She, Glory, and Lord Nelson parted company with the fleet in a gale between 20 and 23 November, at 8°30′S 80°00′E. None of the three vessels was ever heard of again. The EIC declared that the value of its cargo on Experiment was £5,592.

== See also ==
- List of people who disappeared mysteriously at sea
