= Marchioness of Exeter (1801 EIC ship) =

UK East India Company merchant ship (1801–1819)

History

United Kingdom
- Name: Marchioness of Exter
- Namesake: Isabella Cecil, Marchioness of Exeter
- Owner: EIC voyages 1–-4: John Locke; EIC voyages 5-6: Andrew John Nash; EIC voyage 7: Richard Pain.
- Builder: Randall & Brent, Rotherhithe
- Launched: 23 November 1801
- Fate: Last voyage ended in 1819

General characteristics
- Tons burthen: 820, or 82022/94, or 829, or 878 (bm)
- Length: Overall: 146 ft 11 in (44.8 m); Keel: 118 ft 6 in (36.1 m)
- Beam: 36 ft 0 3/4 in (11.0 m)
- Depth of hold: 14 ft 9 in (4.5 m)
- Complement: 1802: 105; 1804: 105; 1811: 105
- Armament: 1802: 22 × 18-pounder guns + 10 × 18-pounder carronades; 1804: 22 × 18-pounder guns + 10 × 18-pounder carronades; 1811: 22 × 18-pounder guns + 10 × 18-pounder carronades

Marchioness of Exeter was launched in 1801 as an East Indiaman of the British East India Company (EIC). She made seven complete voyages for the EIC. She then made one more voyage to Java, sailing under a license from the EIC. Her last voyage ended in 1819.

== Career ==
Marchioness of Exeter was launched on 23 November 1801. She was intended to sail under the command of Captain Alexander Nash, but in his absence, Captain John Locke Jr. would command her on her first voyage. After her launch 300 ladies and gentlemen partook of a cold collation at the yard. They then adjourned to the London Tavern where from 8p.m. there was a ball.

EIC voyage #1 (1802–1803): Captain John Locke, Jr. sailed from Portsmouth on 18 March 1802, during the Peace of Amiens, bound for Madras and the Moluccas. Marchioness of Exeter reached Madras on 26 June. She was at Masulipatam on 4 August and Vizagapatam on 26 August. She returned to Madras on 15 September. She arrived at Batavia, Dutch East Indies, on 16 November and Amboina on 15 December. On 21 March 1803 she was at Timor. War with France resumed and Locke acquired a letter of marque on 27 April 1803. On 8 June she was at Ambonya again. Homeward bound, Marchioness of Exeter reached St Helena on 3 June and arrived back at the Downs on 21 August.

EIC voyage #2 (1804–1805): Captain Alexander Nash acquired a letter of marque on 21 January 1804. He arrived at Portsmouth on 21 February, and sailed from Portsmouth on 20 March 1804, bound for Madras and Bengal. The outward-bound India fleet was under the escort of the frigate HMS Lapwing. Other East Indiamen in the convoy Canton, Lord Nelson, Princess Charlotte, Marquis of Ely, Marquis Wellesley, Lady Jane Dundas, and Brunswick. Marchioness of Exeter parted from the fleet between 22 and 24 March, but may have rejoined it later. Marchioness of Exeter reached Madras on 27 July and Masulipatnam on 21 August, and arrived at Diamond Harbour on 1 September. Homeward bound, she was at Saugor on 25 November, Madras on 26 December, and St Helena on 20 June 1805. She arrived back at the Downs on 10 September.

3rd EIC voyage (1806–1808): Captain Nash sailed from Portsmouth on 14 May 1806, bound for Bengal. Marchioness of Exeter reached the Cape of Good Hope (the Cape), on 6 August and Penang of 15 October. She arrived at Kedgeree on 12 December. On 5 January 1807 she was at Saugor. She visited Madras on 13 January, and returned to Saugor on 11 February. She then revisited Madras on 13 April, and returned to Diamond Harbour on 5 June.

The EIC decided a cartel to transfer French prisoners it was holding to Isle de France (Mauritius) for exchange with English prisoners held there. The decision of which vessel to employ came down a choice between Marchioness of Exeter and Marquis Wellesley; Captain Alexander Nash and Captain Le Blanc chose lots with the result that Marquis Wellesley became the cartel. (Note: In his journal Thomas Addison, then 4th Mate on Marquis Wellesley, did not reveal if either captain viewed themselves as having won. He also mis-identified the other Indiaman as Marquis of Exeter.)

Marchioness of Exeter went up to Calcutta, arriving there on 20 June. Homeward bound, she was at Diamond Haboour on 26 July, Saugor n 20 August, Vizagapatam on 12 September, Madras on 3 October, and the Cape of 30 December. She reached St Helena on 25 January 1808 and arrived back at Long Reach on 11 April.

4th EIC voyage (1809–1810): Captain Nash sailed from Portsmouth on 28 April 1809, bound for Madeira and Bombay. Marchioness of Exeter was at Madeira on 8 May, and Johanna on 24 August, and arrived at Bombay on 19 September. Homeward bound, she was at Point de Galle on 26 February 1810, reached St Helena on 3 May, and arrived back at the Downs on 6 July.

5th EIC voyage (1811–1812): Captain William Baynes acquired a letter of marque on 6 February 1811. He sailed from Portsmouth on 12 March 1811, bound for St Helena and Bengal. Marchioness of Exeter reached St Helena on 30 May and arrived at Diamond Harbour on 19 September. Homeward bound, she was at Saugor on 1 November, and St Helena on 4 March 1812. She arrived back at the Downs on 14 May.

6th EIC voyage (1813–1814): Captain Baynes sailed from Portsmouth on 2 June 1813, bound for Ceylon and Bengal. Marchioness of Exeter reached Madeira on 21 June. She reached Galle on 6 October, but was not able to enter theport. strong currents drove her southward on the 11th. She anchored at Weligama, but the next day parted from her anchors. She finally entered Trincomalee on 18 October. She was at Saugor on 29 December.

Marchioness of Exeter sailed for home in company with Union and "Little Pitt", (Note: It is not clear which vessel "Little Pitt" was. There was no EIC vessel by that name. Neither of the two EIC vessels named William Pitt could be the vessel in question: one had foundered in December 1813 and the other had arrived back in London in August 1813.) and under escort by the 74-gun third rate HMS Danmark. Near the Cape of Good Hope a three-day hurricane hit the convoy, which dispersed. Marchioness of Exeter arrived at the Cape on 16 June. Union reached the Cape on 18 June, after having thrown her guns and part of her cargo overboard in bad weather; her captain had also died during the storm. Danmark, also "much distressed", arrived three days after Union; "Little Pitt" never arrived and was presumed to have foundered.

While she was at the Cape twelve U.S. sailors joined the crew. They had been the crew of a whaler that the Royal Navy had captured and brought into Capetown. They agreed to work their passage to England in the hope that they would stand a better chance of being exchanged for English prisoners of war if they were in England. One of the Americans, Daniel McKenzie, made some observations. He reported that Marchioness of Exeter, in addition to her officers, had 100 English sailors and 50 lascars and Chinese. She also was transporting 300 EIC troops. He also remarked on the low quality of food served the crew, particularly relative to the food served American sailors on their vessels. The Americans negotiated with Captain Baines that they would also receive one pound of bread per man per day. When this was not forthcoming, they refused to work. This led to a confrontation with the Baines; ultimately, their demands were met and they returned to work.

Marchioness of Exeter reached St Helena on 6 September. The voyage went without incident until the convoy reached the Bay of Biscay. There a three-day gale in October caused a great deal of damage to the vessel, which was also running out of food. Fortunately, after the gale subsided, the convoy encountered a transport with provisions sufficient for all the surviving vessels. (A brig had foundered during the gale.) The remainder of the voyage was smooth, and Marchioness of Exeter arrived at the Downs on 16 November.

7th EIC voyage (1816–1817): Captain Thomas Gilpin sailed from the Downs on 21 April 1816, bound directly for China. She sailed through the Straits of Sunda in company with five other East Indiamen. Marchioness of Exeter arrived at Whampoa Anchorage on 6 September. Homeward bound, she crossed the Second Bar on 21 December. She reached St Helena on 18 March 1817, and arrived in the Downs on 26 May.

Licensed ship: In 1813 the EIC had lost its monopoly on the trade between India and Britain. British ships were then free to sail to India or the Indian Ocean under a licence from the EIC. In 1817 Marchioness of Exeter began sailing to India under such a licence.

She entered Lloyd's Register (LR), in the volume for 1818.

| Year | Master | Owner | Trade | Source |
|---|---|---|---|---|
| 1818 | T.Gilpin | R.Payne | London–India | LR |

Marchioness of Exeter, Gilpin, master, left England on 16 July 1818. On 3 September she was at 22°42′N 32°47′W, on her way to British Bencoolen. She arrived at Batavia on 7 December. On 1 May 1819, she was at Cape Agulhas, 57 days out of Sourabaya. She arrived at Portsmouth on 2 August from Batavia and the Cape of Good Hope, and at Gravesend on 9 August.

This was probably Marchioness of Exeter's last voyage. She no longer appeared in Lloyd's List's ship arrival and departure data in 1820 or 1821. Lloyd's Register did continue to carry her until 1826.
