= Lord Nelson (1799 ship) =

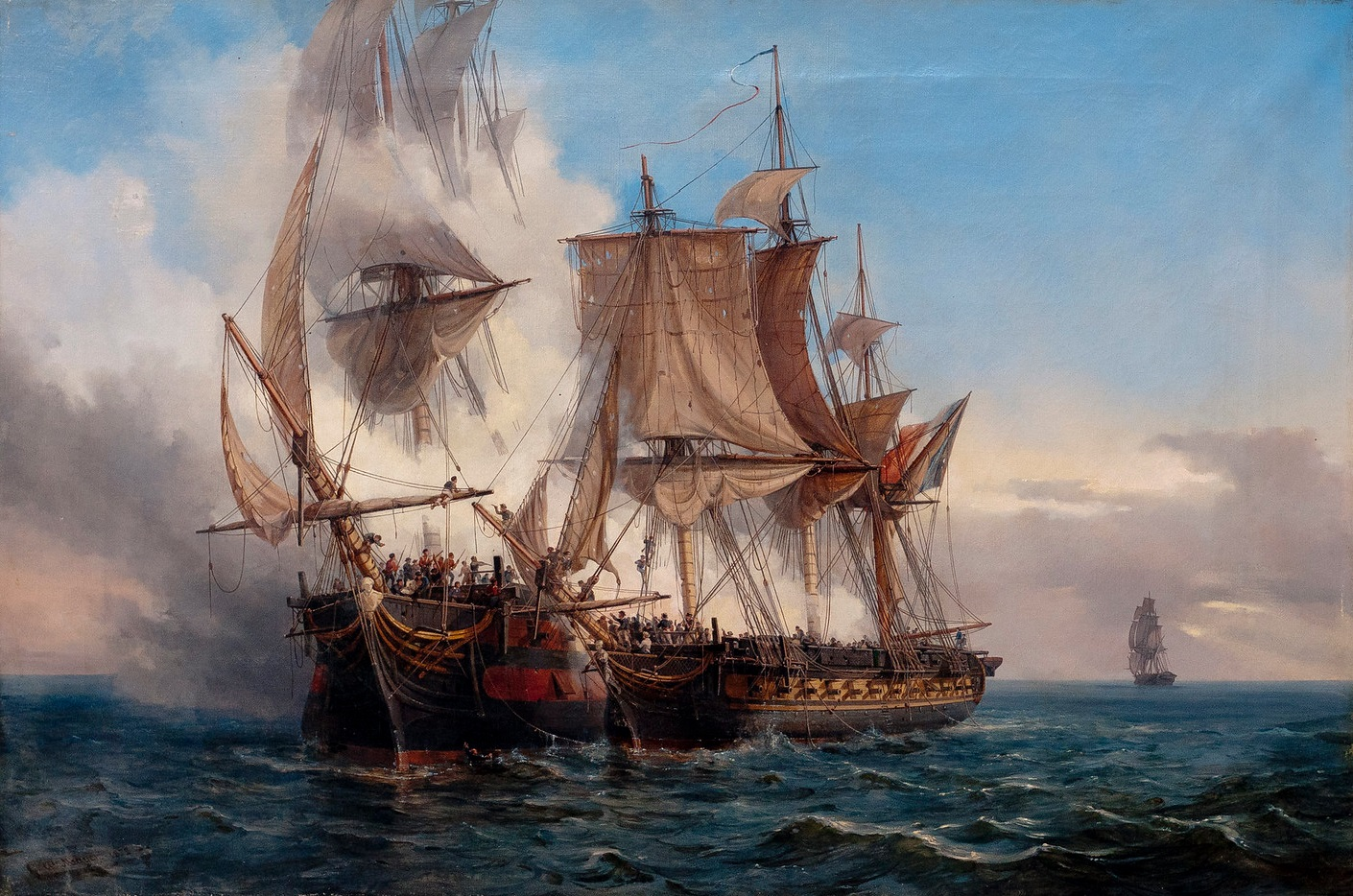
- 1872 painting of Lord Nelson (left) being attacked by Bellone on 14 August 1803 by Auguste Étienne François Mayer

History

British East India Company
- Name: Lord Nelson
- Owner: EIC voyages #1–3: Robert Charnock, Esq.; EIC voyages #4–5: Henry Bonham, Esq. (Note: Bonham was MP for Rye and had a younger brother, George Bonham, who was a captain in the East India Company's service and who was lost in 1810 when in command of True Briton during a gale in the China Sea.)
- Ordered: c. 1798 (Note: The East India company published a tariff of freight rates for Lord Nelson dated 27 March 1798.)
- Builder: Barnard’s Yard, Deptford
- Launched: 29 October 1799
- Captured: 14 August 1803 but recaptured 27 August 1803
- Fate: Disappeared after 21 November 1808

General characteristics
- Type: East Indiaman
- Tons burthen: 818, or 81925/94 (bm)
- Length: 146 ft 2 in (44.6 m) (overall); 118 ft 8 1/2 in (36.2 m) (keel)
- Beam: 36 ft 0 1/4 in (11.0 m)
- Depth of hold: 14 ft 9 in (4.5 m)
- Armament: Voyages 1 & 2: 20 × 18-pounder guns + 6 × 12-pounder guns; Voyages 3, 4 & 5: 32 guns

Lord Nelson was an East Indiaman, launched in late 1799, sailing for the East India Company. She made five voyages, of which she completed four. (Note: Hardy lists four, including two that he labels as voyage #3. However, he omits a voyage between the third and the last.) On her second voyage the French privateer Bellone captured her, but the Royal Navy recaptured her within about two weeks. On her fifth voyage, Lord Nelson foundered in 1808 with the loss of all aboard.

== 1st voyage (1800–1801) ==
Under Captain Robert Spottiswoode she sailed to the coast of India and to China, leaving on 17 March 1800 and returning on 17 June 1801. Spottiswoode had made at least five prior cruises to India or the Far East for the East India Company, starting as a fourth lieutenant in 1784. This was his first voyage as captain. Before she sailed Spottiswoode arranged for a letter of marque for Lord Nelson, the warrant being dated 14 February 1800.

Lord Nelson left on 17 March 1800 and reached Madras on 13 July. She went on to Penang, which she reached on 27 August, Malacca (23 September), Whampoa anchorage (2 November), and Second Bar (of the Pearl River; 29 December). On her return leg she arrived at St Helena on 16 April and on 11 June she arrived at the Downs.

== 2nd voyage (1802) ==
Under Captain Robert Spottiswoode she left Britain on 14 March 1802 for the coast of India and the Bay of Bengal.

=== Capture ===
Lord Nelson was on her return voyage when on 14 August 1803 she encountered the French three-masted privateer Bellone off Cape Clear, Ireland. Bellone, of Saint Malo, had had some success privateering in the Indian Ocean towards the end of the French Revolutionary Wars. When the Napoleonic Wars commenced she took to the sea again under the command of her former captain, Jacques François Perroud. She was on her first cruise of the new wars when she encountered Lord Nelson.

Bellone had 34 guns, including 24 long 8-pounder guns, and though she had more guns, her broadside was inferior to that on Lord Nelson. What made the difference was that Bellone had a crew of 260 men, versus the 102 men, exclusive of passengers, on Lord Nelson. However, Bellone also had on board some 56 prisoners from various captures. (Note: On 12 August she had captured the Diamond, a West Indiaman.)

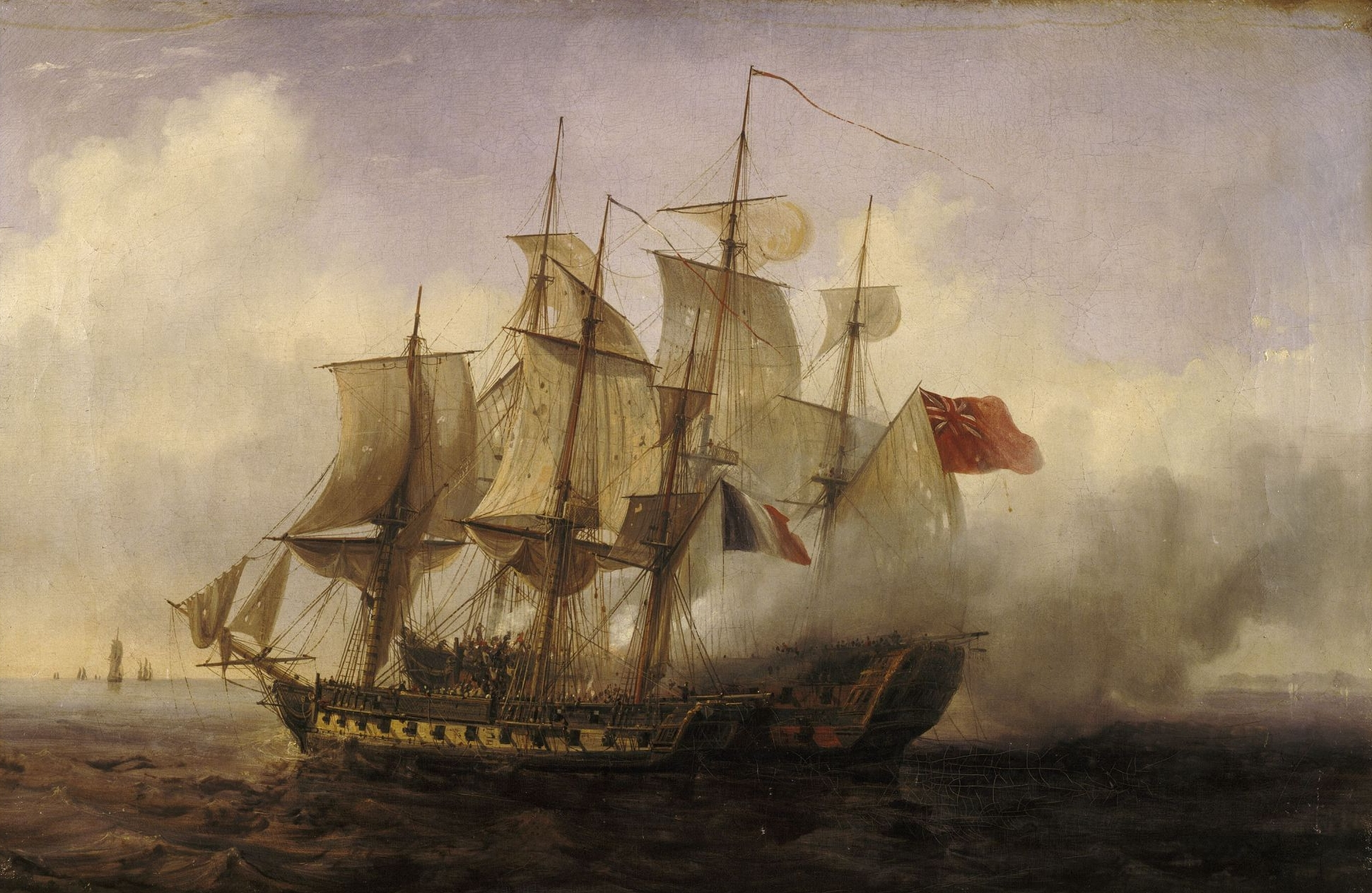
Battle between Bellone and Lord Nelson

An engagement of one and a half hours now ensued. Lord Nelson was able to fend off one attempt at boarding, but succumbed to the second. In the fight, Lord Nelson had lost five men killed and 31 wounded. Two of the dead were passengers. (Note: One was William Spottiswoode, older brother to the captain, and the other was Lieutenant-Colonel Peter McGregor Murray. Spottiswoode was a surgeon and Murray had been a surgeon's mate but had changed careers, rising to the post of Adjutant-General of the Bengal Army. He was retiring with a fortune of £200,000. Murray's wife was with him on the ship.) Perroud put on board a prize crew of 41 men under the command of Lieutenant Fougie and the two vessels sailed towards A Coruña. On 20 August they encountered a British frigate and the two vessels separated, with the frigate pursuing the captor rather than the captive. (Note: Perroud escaped to northwest Spain. There he recruited some more crew members and sailed for the Indian Ocean. He was later captured off Ceylon, in the action of 9 July 1806. The British took her into service as the sixth rate frigate HMS Bellona.) Then on 23 August, the British privateer Thomas and John, of fourteen 6-pounder guns, engaged Lord Nelson for two hours before breaking off the engagement. In the course of another day, a hired armed cutter of twelve 4-pounder guns shadowed Lord Nelson before sailing away.

=== Recapture ===
Seagull, under the command of Captain Henry Burke, had escorted a convoy from Plymouth to Cork and on her way back encountered a Portuguese schooner that reported having met with a French privateer off Cape Clear. Burke immediately set out to find her. (Note: The Naval Chronicle reports that the cutter later encountered Seagull and reported Lord Nelson's whereabouts, but Burke makes no mention of this.)

Instead, around 1pm on 26 August, he sighted a large vessel and immediately set out in pursuit. After a chase of five hours Burke was able to bring his quarry to action in an engagement that lasted throughout the night. At daylight, Lord Nelson having expended all her cartridges, Fougie later informed Burke that on Seagull's next approach Lord Nelson would have struck her colours. However, Burke had to pull back to repair extensive damage to Seagull's mast and rigging, and two shot holes between wind and water, i.e., just below her water line.

While Seagull was undertaking her repairs Fougie's crew were able to prepare new cartridges and might have resumed the engagement when Seagull approached again. However, in the interim a squadron under Sir Edward Pellew in Tonnant came into sight, with Colossus leading. Seagull signaled to the approaching vessels and as they came up, Fougie struck to Colossus.

In the fight Seagull had had two men killed and eight men wounded, one of whom apparently died later. French casualties were unreported. Boats from Colossus boarded Lord Nelson where they found that five of her original crew had been serving the guns in the fight against Seagull. They protested that they were Americans (not renegade Englishmen, and so free agents), but the prize crew put them in chains pending subsequent further investigation in Britain. Pellew then gave Seagull the honour of escorting Lord Nelson back to Plymouth, where they arrived on 14 September and where Seagull could undergo much necessary repairs and refitting. The East India company, with the agreement of Lloyd's Underwriters, agreed a salvage of one-sixth the value of Lord Nelson. Somewhat unfortunately for Seagull, she would have to share the salvage not only with Colossus, but also with the other three ships-of-the-line in Pellew's squadron.

The East India Company rewarded Spottiswoode with a valuable sword and a service of plate in recognition of his gallant defence of Lord Nelson. He apparently retired to become laird of Dunipace, having succeeded his brother William, but died on 30 September 1805.

=== In fiction ===
The whole episode of the capture and recapture of Lord Nelson provides the narrative of Chapter 5 of Patrick O'Brian's novel Post Captain in his Aubrey–Maturin series with the addition of his fictional characters Captain Jack Aubrey and Stephen Maturin being among the passengers aboard Lord Nelson.

== 3rd voyage (1804–1805) ==
On her third voyage, Lord Nelson was under the command of Captain Wemyss Orrok (or Orrock). A change of captain meant a new letter of marque, this one dated 25 February 1804. The warrant notes that Lord Nelson now carried 32 guns but did not distinguish how many of each type.

She left on 20 March 1804 for the coast of India and the Bay of Bengal. Lord Nelson was one of a convoy of eight East Indiamen, all under escort by HMS Lapwing. The other East Indiamen in the convoy were Marchioness of Exeter, Canton, Princess Charlotte, Marquis of Ely, Marquis Wellesley, Lady Jane Dundas, and Brunswick.

Other East Indiamen in the convoy included Brunswick, Canton, and Princess Charlotte.

Lord Nelson reached Madras on 19 July, Diamond Harbour on 12 August, and Saugor on 21 November before returning to Madras on 12 February. By 29 June she was again at St Helena, reaching the Downs by 10 September. She was back in port in Britain on 12 September 1805.

Orrok died in mid-1805 at St Helena on the return leg of the trip, and while it is not certain who was captain for the remainder of the voyage, it was probably her first lieutenant Frederick Gaillard.

== 4th voyage (1806–1807) ==
For her fourth voyage Lord Nelson was under the command of Captain William Charles Hutton. His letter of marque was dated 8 February 1806 and also gave her armament as 32 guns.

Lord Nelson left Britain on 30 March 1806 for St Helena and Bengal in a convoy that included Asia, Lady Burges, Lord Melville, Sovereign, and Walthamstow, all under the escort of HMS Leopard.

During the night of 20 April Lady Burges wrecked on a reef off Boa Vista, Cape Verde. Boats from the convoy were able to rescue 150 of the 184 people on board; 34 drowned.

Lord Nelson reached St Helena on 27 June, the Cape of Good Hope on 26 August, Diamond Harbour on 12 November, Saugor on 26 December, Madras on 10 January 1807 and Bombay 19 February.

Lord Nelson left Bombay for Britain on 27 February with some officers of the 77th Regiment as passengers. For the return leg she was in Tellichery on 4 March and St Helena again on 15 June. She arrived in the Downs on 6 September.

== 5th voyage ==
For her fifth voyage Lord Nelson was still under the command of Captain William Charles Hutton. She left Britain on 5 March 1808 for Madras and Bengal.

On 5 August 1808 nine East Indiamen, including Lord Nelson, arrived at Madras. Unfortunately, now Rear Admiral Pellew was there in Culloden. He inspected the crews of all the vessels and pressed 157 men in all. The captains were furious, and remonstrated with Pellew, informing him that he had left them too shorthanded to sail safely back to Britain. He relented slightly, returning 24 men. Hutton and the others then had to make do by recruiting local lascars to get enough men to bring up the size of the crew; Lord Nelson would sail with about 110 men, exclusive of passengers. As was common, she would also carry a number of passengers, including a Bengal Army officer, Lieutenant-colonel David Thomas Richardson, his wife and their three children.

When Hutton and Lord Nelson had arrived in the Far East, he had lost 38 men to impressment to various naval vessels. In all, of the 114 men with whom he had left Britain, he had lost 55–6 to the press, six each to disease and desertion, two to drowning, and one to resignation.

Hutton was the most experienced of the nine captains and was the commodore of the fleet. That is, should they lose contact with their escort, HMS Albion, under the command of Captain John Ferrier, Hutton would take command of the fleet.

On 26 October the fleet left Madras. Around 20 November a gale began that dispersed the entire convoy. Lord Nelson then parted company with the fleet on 21 November at around 8°30′S 80°0′E. She was never heard of again. Two other East Indiamen, Experiment, and Glory, also disappeared without a trace.

The EIC put the value of the lost cargoes at £63,468, £12,470, and £11,875 for Lord Nelson, Experiment, and Glory. The EIC valued her cargo at £57,091; the total loss, vessel plus cargo, was £117,820.
