= Northumberland (1780 EIC ship) =

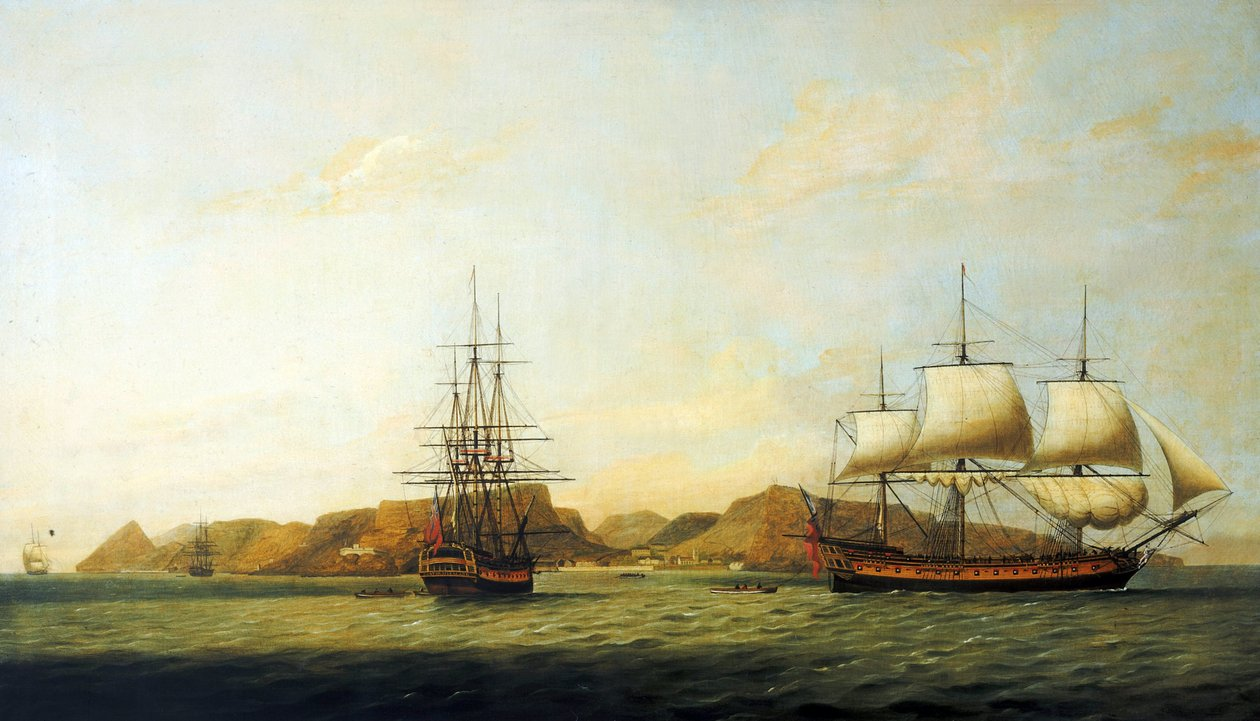
- Two views of Northumberland off St Helena, Thomas Luny, National Maritime Museum

History

Great Britain
- Name: Northumberland
- Owner: John Mitford, and Samuel Rush and William Milford.
- Builder: Wells, Deptford
- Launched: December 1780
- Fate: Sold for breaking up 1797

General characteristics
- Type: East Indiaman
- Tons burthen: 755, 784, or 78412/94 (bm)
- Length: 145 ft 6 in (44.3 m) (overall); 118 ft 6 in (36.1 m) (keel)
- Beam: 35 ft 3 1/4 in (10.8 m)
- Depth of hold: 14 ft 8 1/2 in (4.5 m)
- Sail plan: Full-rigged ship
- Complement: 1781: 99; 1793: 80; 1795:100
- Armament: 1781: 26 × 9&4-pounder guns; 1793: 10 × 9&4-pounder guns; 1795:20 × 9&4-pounder guns
- Notes: Three decks

Northumberland was launched in 1780 to serve as a regular ship of the British East India Company (EIC). She made six voyages for the EIC between 1780 and 1797. She was sold in 1797 for breaking up.

== Voyages ==
EIC voyage #1 (1781–1784): Captain James Rees acquired a letter of marque on 21 April 1781. He sailed from Plymouth on 26 June 1781, bound for St Helena and Bengal. Northumberland was at Annobon on 9 September and St Helena on 17 October.

Lloyd's List reported on 8 February 1782 that Northumberland had caught fire south of the Equator. The crew was able to put the fire out before there was any material damage. Even so, some private property had to be jettisoned.

Northumberland reached Vizagapatam on 3 April 1782 and Kedgeree on 14 April. She sailed on 23 April to Bencoolen, which she reached on 12 November. She was detained there until 19 January 1785. When she finally left, Rees was unable to take the route he had originally intended and had to sail westward. At some point Northumberland was at New Guinea. Rees sent a boat ashore to gather water. Local natives attacked the boat crew, killing or capturing them. Rees lost his chief, third, and fourth officers, and 12 seamen. Eventually Prince Nujku, of Ceram sent proas that rescued the survivors and took them to Bencoolen.

She was at Sulu on 1 June 1783, and arrived at Whampoa Anchorage on 25 July. After he had arrived in China, Rees wrote a letter in which he mentioned the loss of the men at New Guinea. He reported that between the time she left Bengal and the time she arrived in China, Northumberland had lost 71 men.

Homeward bound, she crossed the Second Bar on 8 December, reached the Cape of Good Hope 7 March 1784 and St Helena on 31 March. She sailed from St Helena on 7 April, and arrived at the Downs on 29 May.

EIC voyage #2 (1785–1787): On 2 April 1785 soldiers on board Northumberland at Spithead staged a mutiny. Still, Captain Rees sailed from Portsmouth on 25 April, bound for Bombay. Northumberland reached Johanna on 17 August and arrived at Bombay on 15 September. She was at Surat on 8 December before returning to Bombay on 5 January 1785. She was at Anjengo on 27 January, and then Bombay again March. Her next excursion was to Tellicherry, which she reached on 3 April, before she returned to Bombay on 5 May. She then sailed from Bengal on 24 June, arriving at Whampoa Anchorage on 10 August. Homeward bound, she crossed the Second Bar on 9 December. She reached St Helena on 12 March 1787, and arrived at the Downs on 16 May.

On 22 April Northumberland collided with Phoenix off Gravesend. Both ships were badly damaged.

EIC voyage #3 (1788–1789): Captain Rees sailed from the Downs on 4 April 1788, bound for Bombay and Bengal. Northumberland reached Johanna on 7 July and arrived at Bombay on 26 July. She was at Madras on 2 October and arrived at Kedgeree on 26 October. Homeward bound, she was at Cox's Island on 19 February 1789, reached St Helena on 2 June, and arrived at the Downs on 2 August.

EIC voyage #4 (1791–1792): On 22 March 1791 Lyon, Bartlet, master, was setting out for Cork and Newfoundland when she ran into Northumberland, carrying away her main and mizzen masts, and then grounded at Tilbury Fort. Even so, Captain Rees sailed from the Downs on 16 April, bound for Madras and Bengal. Northumberland reached Madras on 14 August and arrived at Ingeli (a point on the west side of the Hooghli Estuary), on 30 August. Homeward bound she was at Saugor on 18 January 1792. She reached Madras on 26 February and St Helena on 31 May, and arrived at the Downs on 25 July.

EIC voyage #5 (1793–1794): Captain Charles Jones received a letter of marque on 18 May 1793, following the outbreak of war with France. He sailed from Portsmouth on 17 July 1793, bound for Bengal. Northumberland reached Diamond Harbour on 17 November. Homeward bound, she was at Saugor on 12 January 1794, reached St Helena on 1 May, and Galway on 20 July. She arrived at the Downs on 29 August.

EIC voyage #6 (1795–1797): Captain James Rees was again captain of Northumberland on this, her sixth and last voyage. He acquired a letter of marque 14 April 1795. He sailed from Portsmouth on 24 May 1795, bound for China. She had sailed with a convoy of Indiamen that were bringing General Alured Clarke and his troops for the invasion of the Cape Colony.

Northumberland was at San Salvadore on 6 July.

She sailed on 13 July, together with the other Indiamen, and under the escort of Sphinx. However, Sphinx ran into Warren Hastings and both vessels returned to port, accompanied by Exeter.

Northumberland and the convoy arrived at False Bay on 4 September, and the Cape of Good Hope on 1 October. Northumberland delivered her troops and then sailed for Whampoa Anchorage, where she arrived on 7 March 1796. Homeward bound, she crossed the Second Bar on 22 June. She was at St Helena on 20 November, and arrived at the Downs on 8 February 1797.

== Fate ==
Northumberland was sold in 1797 for breaking up.
