= Warren Hastings (1781 EIC ship) =

History

British East India Company
- Name: Warren Hastings
- Namesake: Warren Hastings
- Owner: EIC voyage #1: William Larkins; EIC voyage #2: Mrs Christian Larkins; EIC voyage #3-5: Thomas Larkins; EIC voyage #6: John Pascal Larkins
- Builder: Barnard, Deptford
- Launched: 22 August 1781
- Fate: Sold 1797 for breaking up

General characteristics
- Tons burthen: 763, or 76380/94, or 786 (bm)
- Length: Overall: 142 ft 9 in (43.5 m); Keel: 115 ft 8 1/2 in (35.3 m)
- Beam: 35 ft 2 3/4 in (10.7 m), hold 14 ft 9 in (4.50 m)
- Depth of hold: 14 ft 9 in (4.5 m)
- Complement: 80
- Armament: 12 × 9&4-pouder guns
- Notes: Three decks

Warren Hastings was launched in 1781 as an East Indiaman for the British East India Company (EIC). She made six voyages for the EIC before being sold in 1797 for breaking up.

== Career ==
1st E1C voyage (1782–1784): Captain Thomas Larkins sailed from Portsmouth on 6 February 1782, bound for Bombay, Madras, and Bengal. Warren Hastings reached Bombay on 5 September, Madras on 19 October, and Diamond Island on 8 December. She was at Kedgeree on 15 January 1783, and left Bengal on 1 May for Bombay. She arrived at Bombay on 22 July, Tellicherry on 20 September, Cochin on 26 September, and Culpee on 30 October. Homeward bound, she left Kedgeree on 6 March 1784, reached St Helena on 14 June, and arrived back at the Downs on 21 September.

2nd E1C voyage (1785–1786): Captain Thomas Larkins sailed from the Downs on 8 April 1785, bound for China. Warren Hastings arrived at Whampoa Anchorage on 20 August. Homeward bound, she crossed the Second Bar on 2 January 1786, reached St Helena on 17 March, and arrived back at the Downs on 20 May.

3rd E1C voyage (1787–1788): Captain John Pascal Larkins sailed from the Downs on 13 April 1787, bound for Bombay and China. Warren Hastings reached Bombay on 31 July and arrived at Whampoa on 20 January 1788. Homeward bound, she crossed the Second Bar on 8 April, reached St Helena on 27 July, and arrived at the Downs on 23 September.

4th E1C voyage (1790–1791): Captain John Pascal Larkins sailed from the Downs on 3 May 1790, bound for Bengal and Madras. Warren Hastings arrived at Diamond Harbour on 18 September. She was at Ingeli on 15 December, and left there on 29 December. She reached Madras on 11 January 1791, and returned to Ingeli on 27 March. Homeward bound, she was at Madras again on 12 April, reached the Cape on 9 July and St Helena on 2 August, and arrived back at the Downs on 6 October.

5th E1C voyage (1793–1794): War with France had broken out and Captain Francis William Leigh was able to acquire a letter of marque on 12 June 1793. He sailed from Portsmouth on 7 July, bound for Bengal. Warren Hastings arrived at Diamond Harbour on 27 November. She was at Saugor on 26 January 1794. Homeward bound, she left Saugor on 21 February, reached St Helena on 1 May St Helena and Galway Bay on 20 July, and arrived at the Downs on 27 August.

6th E1C voyage (1795–1797): Captain Leigh sailed from Portsmouth on 24 May 1795, bound for the Cape and China. Warren Hastings reached San Salvadore on 6 July, Simons Bay on 4 September, and the Cape on 2 October. From there she was at Java on 19 December, and arrived at Whampoa on 4 March 1796. Homeward bound, she crossed the Second Bar on 26 June, reached Sapi Bay (on the east end of Sumbawa) on 10 September and St Helena on 20 November, and arrived at the Downs on 8 February 1797 .

== Fate ==
Warren Hastings was sold in 1797 for breaking up.
