= Marquis Wellesley (1799 EIC ship) =

Ship of the British East India Company

History

Great Britain
- Name: Marquis Wellesley
- Owner: EIC voyage #1: Walter Cleland; EIC voyage #2: Matthew White; EIC voyages #3-5: Edward Ellice; EIC voyage #6: Patrick Chalmers
- Builder: Randall, Rotherhithe
- Launched: 29 November 1799
- Fate: Wrecked 16 April 1813

General characteristics
- Tons burthen: 818, or 81837/94, or 868 (bm)
- Length: Overall:146 ft 2 in (44.6 m); Keel:118 ft 8 in (36.2 m)
- Beam: 36 ft 0 in (11.0 m)
- Depth of hold: 14 ft 9 in (4.5 m)
- Complement: 1800:99; 1809:110
- Armament: 1800:26 × 18-pounder guns; 1809:30 × 12-pounder guns

Marquis Wellesley (or Marquis of Wellesley) was launched at Rotherhithe in 1799. She made five complete voyages for the British East India Company (EIC) before she was lost in 1813 on her sixth.

== Career ==
=== 1st EIC voyage (1800–1801) ===
Captain Bruce Mitchell acquired a letter of marque on 15 February 1800. He sailed from Portsmouth on 17 March, bound for Madras and China. Marquis Wellesley reached Madras on 12 July, Penang on 27 August, and Malacca on 24 September. She arrived at Whampoa Anchorage on 30 October. Homeward bound, she crossed the Second Bar, reached St Helena on 15 April, and arrived back at the Downs on 12 June.

=== 2nd EIC voyage (1802–1803) ===
Captain Mitchell sailed from Portsmouth on 5 March 1802 bound for Madras and Bengal. Marquis Wellesley reached Madras on 24 June and arrived at Diamond Harbour on 4 July. She was at Kedgeree on 8 September and was back at Madras on 7 October. She stopped at Penang on 2 November and again returned to Madras on 16 January 1803. Homeward bound, she reached St Helena on 13 May and arrived in the Downs on 1 August.

=== 3rd EIC voyage (1804–1805) ===
Captain Charles Le Blanc sailed from Portsmouth on 20 March 1804, bound for Madras, and Bengal. Marquis Wellesley reached Madras on 18 July and arrived at Diamond Harbour on 12 August. She was at Saugor on 16 September and Madras again on 12 October. She stopped at Acheh on 19 November and Penang on 9 December before returning to Madras on 27 December. She stopped at Vizagaptam on 29 January 1805 and Masulipatam on 21 February before returning to Madras on 3 March. Homeward bound, she reached St Helena on 20 June and arrived at the Downs on 4 September.

=== 4th EIC voyage (1806–1808) ===
Captain Le Blanc sailed from Portsmouth on 14 May 1806, bound for Madras and Bengal. Marquis Wellesley reached Simons Bay on 6 August and Penang on 13 October. She arrived at Kedgeree on 11 December. She was at Madras on 13 January 1807 and returned to Saugor on 11 February. She was at Madras on 13 April.

The EIC decided a cartel to transfer French prisoners to Isle de France (Mauritius). The decision of which vessel to employ came down a choice between Marquis Wellesley and Marchioness of Exeter; Captain Le Blanc and Captain Alexander Nash chose lots with the result that Marquis of Wellesley became the cartel. (Note: In his journal Thomas Addison, then 4th Mate on Marquis Wellesley, did not reveal if either captain viewed themselves as having won. He also mis-identified the other Indiaman as Marquis of Exeter.) Preparation included stripping her of most of her guns. She finally sailed on 11 June with 205 French officers and men. She reached Pondicherry on 17 June, and arrived at Mauritius on 18 July. She was warped into port and brought alongside the French frigate Piémontaise. (Note: Piemontaise had just captured and brought into port the Indiaman Warren Hastings, which the Danish East India Company purchased and named Holsten (II). The British recaptured Warren Hastings/Holsten (II) the next year.) At Mauritius Governor-General Decaen declined to parole any English prisoners in exchange for the French prisoners he had received. One prisoner in particular that he did not release was Matthew Flinders. Decaen also delayed Marquis Wellesley's departure for some months. (Note: Decaen finally released Flinders, who had had a French passport at the time of his detention, in 1810.) Marquis Wellesley finally sailed on 12 October.

Marquis Wellesley was back at Calcutta on 3 December. Homeward bound, she was at Saugor on 20 January 1808. She reached Point de Galle on 7 March and St Helena on 11 June; she arrived at the Downs on 14 August.

=== 5th EIC voyage (1809–1810) ===
Captain Le Blanc acquired a letter of marque on 14 March 1809. He sailed from Portsmouth on 28 April, bound for Ceylon and Bengal. Marquis Wellesley reached Trincomalee on 13 September and arrived at Diamond Harbour on 26 September. Homeward bound, she was at Saugor on 9 December. She stopped at Vizagapatam on 31 December, Madras, on 13 January 1810, and Colombo on 3 February She reached St Helena on 3 May and arrived at the Downs on 6 July.

=== 6th EIC voyage (1811–loss) ===
Captain L Blanc sailed from Torbay on 30 May 1811, bound for Madeira, Ceylon, and Bengal. Marquis Welesley was at Madeira on 20 June, Colombo on 20 October, and Kedgeree on 13 December. She arrived at Calcutta on 21 February 1812. She was at Saugor on 7 May on her way to Bencoolen, which she arrived at on 9 July. She was back at Diamond Harbour on 12 September. Homeward bound, she was at Saugor 15 December and Madras on 27 January 1813. Either on her way to Madras or after, Marquis Wellesley sustained damages that led Captain Le Blanc to sail to Bombay to effect repairs. She arrived at Bombay on 22 March.

== Fate ==
On 16 April 1813 Marquis Wellesley, Le Blanc, master, struck a rock in Bombay Harbour and became a total loss. As she was coming out of dock at Bombay after having received repairs she struck a rock near the pier head and foundered. By 24 April she was a complete wreck. The EIC put a value of £5,210 on its cargo on her.
