= Earl St Vincent (1799 EIC ship) =

British East India Company ship

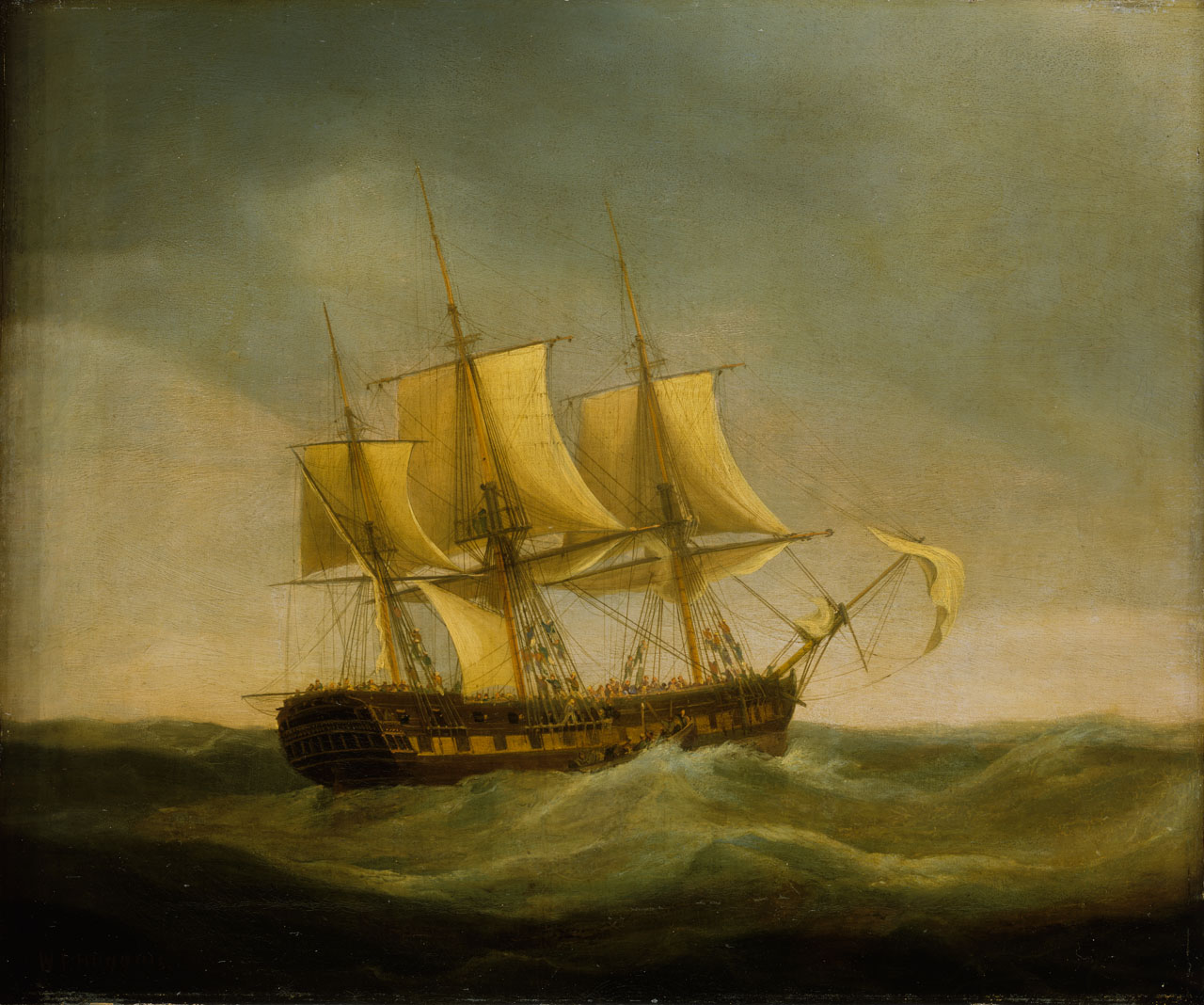
- The East Indiaman Saint Vincent saving the crew of the East Indiaman Ganges, 29 May 1807, William John Huggins, National Maritime Museum, Greenwich

History
- Name: Earl St. Vincent
- Namesake: John Jervis, 1st Earl of St Vincent
- Owner: John Pascall Larkins
- Builder: Barnard, Deptford
- Launched: 13 December 1799
- Fate: Sold 1813 for breaking up

General characteristics
- Tons burthen: 808, or 81865/94, or 860, or 868 (bm)
- Length: 146 ft 1 in (44.5 m) (overall); 118 ft 7 1/2 in (36.2 m) (keel)
- Beam: 36 ft 0 1/4 in (11.0 m)
- Depth of hold: 14 ft 9 in (4.5 m)
- Propulsion: Sail
- Complement: 1800:100; 1804:100; 1806:105; 1808:105; 1810:90
- Armament: 1800:26 × 12&6-pounder guns; 1804:26 × 18&9-pounder guns; 1806:26 × 18&9-pounder guns; 1808:26 × 18&9-pounder guns; 1810:26 × 12&6-pounder guns
- Notes: Three decks

Earl St Vincent was launched on the Thames in 1799. Between 1800 and 1813 she made seven voyages for the British East India Company (EIC), primarily to India, though on one voyage she reached Canton. In 1813 she was sold for breaking up.

== Career ==
=== EIC voyage #1 (1800-1801) ===
Captain John Brook Samson acquired a letter of marque on 14 January 1800. He sailed from Portsmouth on 17 March 1800, bound for Madras and China. Earl St Vincent reached Madras on 17 July and Penang on 29 August, and arrived at Whampoa Anchorage on 3 November. Homeward bound, she crossed the Second Bar on 14 January 1801, reached St Helena on 15 April, and arrived at Long Reach on 17 June.

=== EIC voyage #2 (1802-1803) ===
Captain Samson sailed from Portsmouth on 13 April 1802, bound for Bombay, which she reached on 13 August. On 3 October she was at Anjengo, before returning to Bombay on 12 November. Homeward bound, she reached 10 Jan 1803 Tellicherry on 10 January 1803 and St Helena on 19 March, before arriving at Long Reach on 1 June.

=== EIC voyage #3 (1804-1805) ===
Captain Samson acquired a letter of marque on 9 March 1804. He sailed from Portsmouth on 8 May 1804, bound for Bombay, which he reached on 14 September. Earl St Vincent then visited several ports in the region, stopping at Cannanore on 30 October, Severndroog on 7 December, and Bancoot on 12 December, before returning to Bombay on 17 December. Homeward bound she was at Tellicherry on 22 February 1805, Anjengo on 6 March, and St Helena on 27 June. She arrived at Northfleet on 15 September.

=== EIC voyage #4 (1806-1807) ===
Captain Charles Jones acquired a letter of marque on 28 January 1806. He sailed from Portsmouth on 30 March 1806, bound for Bombay. Earl St Vincent reached Bombay on 19 August. She was at Goa on 2 December, and Bombay again on 15 December. Homeward bound, she was at Tellicherry 7 February and Anjengo on 28 February, before deviating to Point de Galle on 7 March.

On 29 May 1807 Ganges was off the Cape of Good Hope when she sprang a leak. She sank at 38°22′S 19°50′E, almost due south of Cape Agulhas. Fortunately there was no loss of life. Earl St Vincent, which was in company, managed to get all 203 or 209 persons on board Ganges off, including a number of soldiers from the 77th regiment of Foot. When Captain Harrington finally left Ganges in the last boats from Earl St Vincent Ganges had ten feet of water in the well and was wholly ungovernable by the helm. She foundered at noon the following day.

Earl St Vincent reached St Helena on 16 June, and arrived at Long Reach on 9 September.

=== EIC voyage #5 (1808-1809) ===
Captain John B. Samson acquired a letter of marque on 11.3. March 1808. He sailed from Portsmouth on 8 May 1808, bound for Bombay. Earl St Vincent reached Madeira on 30 May, and arrived at Bombay on 18 September. On 19 November she was at Goa, but returned to Bombay on 25 November. Homeward bound she was at Pointe de Galle on 8 February 1809. On 15 February she sailed from Point de Galle as part of a fleet of 15 East Indiamen under escort by HMS Culloden and HMS Terpsichore.

On 14 March, off Mauritius, a gale developed. Four of the ships, Bengal, Calcutta, Jane, Duchess of Gordon, and Lady Jane Dundas, parted company with the main convoy. They were never heard of again. Huddart was the last to vessel to see Bengal and Calcutta; Hugh Inglis was the last vessel to see Jane, Duchess of Gordon and Lady Jane Dundas. The hull of one of the four missing vessels was sighted overturned off Mauritius the following October, but sank before it could be identified.

Earl St Vincent was at the Cape of Good Hope on 10 April, and St Helena on 30 April. She arrived at Long Reach on 17 July.

=== EIC voyage #6 (1810-1811) ===
Captain Samson sailed from Portsmouth on 11 May 1810, bound for Madras, Ceylon, and Bengal. Earl St Vincent was at Madeira on 17 May, and reached Madras on 12 October. She was at Trincomalee on 24 October and Colombo on 5 November, before arriving at Kedgeree on 7 December. Homeward bound she was at Saugor on 26 January 1811 and Colombo again on 7 March. She reached St Helena on 30 May and arrived at Long Reach on 14 August.

=== EIC voyage #7 (1812-18139) ===
Capt William Larkins Pascall acquired a letter of marque on 4 January 1812. He sailed from Portsmouth on 10 March 1812, bound for Madras and Bengal. Earl st Vincent reached Madras on 13 July, and arrived at Diamond Harbour 28 July. Homeward bound, she was at Saugor on 14 September, Vizagapatam on 1 October, and Coninga on 6 October. She was again at Madras on 12 October, the Cape on 25 December, and the St Helena on 26 January 1813. She arrived at Blackwall on 21 May.

== Fate ==
In 1813 her owners sold Earl St Vincent for breaking up.
