= Northumberland (1805 EIC ship) =

History

United Kingdom
- Name: Northumberland
- Owner: Voyage #1: Henry Joseph Hounsom; Voyages #2-3: William Masson; Voyages #4-6: William Sims.
- Builder: Francis Thomas Hurry, Newcastle-upon-Tyne, or Brent
- Launched: 2 February 1805
- Fate: 1819 sold for breaking up

General characteristics
- Type: East Indiaman
- Tons burthen: 637, or 673, or 67324/94 (bm)
- Length: 135 ft 6 1/2 in (41.3 m) (overall); 109 ft 10 in (33.5 m) (keel)
- Beam: 33 ft 0 1/2 in (10.1 m)
- Depth of hold: 14 ft 9 in (4.5 m)
- Sail plan: Full-rigged ship
- Complement: 1805:50; 1808:70
- Armament: 1805:14 × 9&18-pounder guns; 1808:18 × 12-pounder guns
- Notes: Three decks

Northumberland was launched in 1805. She made six voyages as an extra ship of the British East India Company (EIC), between 1805 and 1818. In 1810 and 1811 she served as a transport in the British invasions of Mauritius and Java. She was sold for breaking up in 1819.

== Voyages ==
On 9 April 1805 Thomas Hardy received a contract for six voyages from the EIC. The freight rate was £15 9s per registered ton peacetime rate, plus £12 10s per ton for wartime contingencies as of the first voyage.

=== EIC voyage #1 (1805–1807) ===
Captain George Raincock acquired a letter of marque on 20 June 1805. He sailed from Cork on 31 August, bound for St Helena and Bengal. Northumberland reached Madeira on 29 September and St Helena on 13 December. There a passenger, the future explorer and naturalist William John Burchell left her. She was at the Cape of Good Hope on 27 February 1806, and Penang on 29 May. She parted from Euphrates off the Andaman Islands on 15 July. Although Euphrates arrived at Calcutta on 18 July, Northumberland did not arrive at Calcutta on until 4 August.

Northumberland was at Saugor on 13 September. She was again at Calcutta on 25 September. Homeward bound, albeit indirectly, she was at Saugor on 21 November, and Madras on 11 January 1807. By 20 February she was at Bombay. She reached Point de Galle on 5 April, the Cape on 5 June, and St Helena on 9 July. She arrived back at the Downs on 26 September.

=== EIC voyage #2 (1808–1809) ===
Captain John Robinson Francklin (or Franklin) acquired a letter of marque on 11 March 1808. He sailed from Portsmouth on 15 April 1808, bound for Madras and Bengal. Northumberland was at Madeira on 1 May, and arrived at Madras on 19 September. On 5 November she was at Calcutta. Homeward bound, she was at Saugor on 29 December and Point de Galle on 7 February 1809.

On 15 February she sailed from Point de Galle as part of a fleet of 15 East Indiamen under escort by HMS Culloden and HMS Terpsichore.

On 14 March 1809, off Mauritius, a gale developed. Four of the ships, Bengal, Calcutta, Jane, Duchess of Gordon, and Lady Jane Dundas, parted company with the main convoy. They were never heard of again. Huddart was the last to vessel to see Bengal and Calcutta; Hugh Inglis was the last vessel to see Jane, Duchess of Gordon and Lady Jane Dundas. The hull of one of the four missing vessels was sighted overturned off Mauritius the following October, but sank before it could be identified.

Northumberland reached St Helena on 29 April. She arrived at the Downs on 13 July.

=== EIC voyage #3 (1810–1812) ===
Captain Franklin left Portsmouth on 14 March 1810, bound for Madras and Bengal. She reached Madras on 8 July and arrived at Diamond Harbour 29 July. Outward bound, she was at Saugor at 30 August, and Mauritius on 29 November. She may have been transporting troops or material to support the British invasion of Mauritius. She then returned to Diamond Harbor on 23 February 1811.

Next, she sailed in support of the British invasion of Java. She was at Saugor on 17 March and Malacca on 4 May. Northumberland was in the fourth division, which left Malacca on 17 June.

On 4 August she was at Batavia. She returned to Calcutta on 23 October. Finally homeward bound, she was at Saugor on 26 January 1812, Madras on 4 February, and St Helena on 11 May. She arrived at the Downs on 21 July.

=== EIC voyage #4 (1813–1814) ===
Captain Franklin sailed from Portsmouth on 2 June 1813, bound for Bengal. Northumberland was at Madeira on 22 June Madeira and arrived at Diamond Harbour on 8 November. She was at Calcutta on 25 December. Homeward bound, she was at Saugor on 29 January 1814, the Cape on 25 April, and St Helena on 19 May. She arrived at Woolwich on 12 June.

=== EIC voyage #5 (1815–1816) ===
Captain Franklin sailed from the Downs on 3 April 1815, bound for Madras and Bengal. Northumberland reached Madeira on 18 April and Madras on 6 August. She arrived at Calcutta on 5 September. Homeward bound, she was at Saugor on 25 November, Madras on 29 December, Bencoolen on 1 February 1816, and St Helena on 10 May. She arrived at the Downs on 13 July.

=== EIC voyage #6 (1817–1818) ===
Captain William Mitchell sailed from the Downs on 6 May 1817, bound for Bengal and Bencoolen. Northumberland reached Madeira on 21 May, and arrived at Diamond Harbour on 28 September. On 17 December she was at New Anchorage (Calcutta, near Diamond Harbour and Kedgeree.) On 27 February 1818 she was at Bencoolen. She reached St Helena on 3 July, and arrived at the Downs on 29 August.

== Fate ==
Northumberland was sold in 1819 for breaking up.
