= Harriet (1802 EIC ship) =

British East India Company ship 1802–1812

History

British East India Company
- Name: Harriet
- Owner: EIC voyages #1-2: John Woolmore; EIC voyages #3-6: Charles H Turner
- Builder: Perry, Blackwall
- Launched: 12 October 1802
- Fate: Burnt 14 October 1812

General characteristics
- Type: Ship
- Tons burthen: 540, or 549, or 550, or 5502/94, or 589 (bm)
- Length: Overall:125 ft 3 in (38.2 m); Keel:100 ft 2 1/2 in (30.5 m)
- Beam: 32 ft 1 1/2 in (9.8 m)
- Depth of hold: 16 ft 10 in (5.1 m)
- Propulsion: Sail
- Complement: 60
- Armament: 16 × 12-pounder guns
- Notes: Two decks

Harriet was a two-decker East Indiaman launched in 1802. She made five complete voyages for the British East India Company (EIC), as an "extra ship" i.e., under charter, and accidentally burnt as she was preparing to return to England from her sixth voyage.

== Career ==
=== 1st EIC voyage (1803–1804) ===
Captain William Lynch sailed from the Downs on 30 January 1803, bound for Madras and Calcutta. Harriet reached Madras on 21 May and arrived at Calcutta on 17 June. Shortly after she had sailed war with France resumed and Captain Lynch received a letter of marque on 25 July, while at Calcutta. Homeward bound, Harriet was at Kedgeree on 23 August, and Saugor on 23 September. She reached St Helena on 15 February 1804 and arrived at Long Reach on 1 May.

=== 2nd EIC voyage (1804–1805) ===
Captain Lynch sold from Portsmouth 4 September 1804, bound for Madras and Calcutta. She was at Madeira on 27 September, reached Madras on 17 February 1805, and arrived at Calcutta on 22 March. Homeward bound she was at Diamond Harbour on 6 May and Saugor on 3 June. She reached St Helena on 22 October and arrived at the Downs on 23 December.

=== 3rd EIC voyage (1806–1807) ===
3) 1805/6 Bengal. Captain Lynch sailed from on Portsmouth 10 June 1806, bound for Calcutta, which he reached on 21 November. Homeward bound, Harriet was at Saugor on 31 January 1807 Saugor and Point de Galle on 15 March. She reached St Helena on 15 June and arrived back at the Downs on 6 September.

=== 4th EIC voyage (1808–1809) ===
Captain Lynch sailed from Portsmouth on 8 May 1808, bound for Madras and Calcutta. Harriet was at Madeira on 30 May, reached Madras on 27 September, and arrived at Calcutta on 1 November. Homeward bound, she was at Saugor on 24 December and Point de Galle on 7 February 1809.

On 15 February she sailed from Point de Galle as part of a fleet of 15 East Indiamen (eight regular and seven extra ships), under escort by HMS Culloden and HMS Terpsichore.

On 14 March 1809, Lady Jane Dundas, Calcutta, Bengal, and Jane, Duchess of Gordon parted company with the main convoy off Mauritius in a gale. They were never heard of again. The hull of one of the four missing vessels was sighted overturned off Mauritius the following October, but sank before it could be identified.

Harriet reached St Helena on 29 April and arrived back at the Downs on 13 July.

=== 5th EIC voyage (1810–1811) ===
Captain Lynch sailed from Portsmouth on 11 May 1810, bound for Madras and Calcutta. Harriet was at Madeira on 27 May, reached Madras on 12 October, and arrived at Calcutta on 9 November. Homeward bound, she was at Saugor on 21 December. She stopped at Vizagapatam on 31 January 1811 and Madras on 26 February. She reached St Helena on 17 June and arrived back at the Downs on 30 August.

== Fate ==
Captain Lynch sailed from Portsmouth on 8 April 1812, bound for Madras and Calcutta. Harriet reached Madras on 8 August and arrived at Calcutta on 28 August. She burnt at Calcutta on 14 October while receiving cargo for homeward journey. Her crew were saved. She had burnt to the water's edge and the hulk was sold on 19 October for sicca rupees 6200. The only cargo aboard was saltpetre and a number of bales of hemp. The EIC put a value of £2,635 on the cargo that it had lost.
