= Sir William Bensley (1802 Indiaman) =

History

United Kingdom
- Name: Sir William Bensley
- Namesake: Sir William Bensley
- Owner: EIC voyages 1–2: John Woolmore; EIC voyages 3–6: Robert Burrowes; 1813:St Barbe & Co.
- Builder: William Bayley, Ipswich
- Launched: 22 March 1802
- Fate: 1813 sold for a transport

United Kingdom
- Name: Sir William Bensley
- Acquired: 1813 by purchase
- Fate: Wrecked 18 October 1841

General characteristics
- Tons burthen: 547, or 54791/94 or 575, (bm)
- Length: 124 ft 10 1/2 in (38.1 m) (overall); 100 ft 1 in (30.5 m) (keel)
- Beam: 32 ft 1 in (9.8 m)
- Depth of hold: 15 ft 0 in (4.6 m)
- Complement: 1803:60; 1806:100; 1812:70; 1813:28 men + 6 boys
- Armament: 16 × 12-pounder guns
- Notes: Two decks

Sir William Bensley was launched in 1802 as an East Indiaman for the British East India Company (EIC). Between 1802 and 1813 she made six voyages for the EIC. Her owners sold her and she became a transport. During this time she repelled an American privateer in a single-ship action. She made one voyage transporting convicts to New South Wales (1816–1817). She continued to trade until 1841 when she wrecked at Nova Scotia.

== East Indiaman ==
=== EIC Voyage #1 (1802–1803) ===
Captain Robert Rhode sailed Sir William Bensley from the Downs on 30 May 1802, bound for Bengal. She reached the Cape of Good Hope on 2 September and arrived at Calcutta on 27 November. Homeward bound, she passed Kedgeree on 27 January 1803, reached St Helena on 19 May, and the River Shannon on 25 July. She arrived at the Downs on 23 August.

Captain Rhode received a letter of marque on 25 July 1803, i.e., shortly before he returned to England.

=== EIC Voyage #2 (1804–1805) ===
Rhode sailed from Plymouth on 26 February 1804 for Madras and Bengal. She reached Madeira on 29 March, and Madras on 27 July. She arrived at Calcutta on 3 September. Homeward bound she passed Kedgeree on 11 December and arrived at Madras on 12 February 1805. She reached St Helena on 20 June, and arrived at her moorings on 11 September.

=== EIC Voyage #3 (1806–1807) ===
Captain George Hooper received a letter of marque on 21 January 1806. He sailed from Portsmouth on 4 March, bound for Madras and Bengal. She reached Madras on 27 June and arrived at Calcutta on 12 July. Homeward bound, she was at Culpee on 13 December, but did not pass Saugor until 10 January 1807. She reached St Helena on 19 April and arrived at the Downs on 2 July.

=== EIC Voyage #4 (1808–1809) ===
Captain Hooper sailed from Portsmouth on 15 April, bound for Madras and Bengal. Sir William Bensley reached Madras on 22 August and arrived at Calcutta on 14 September. Homeward bound she was at Culpee on 25 December, reached Point de Galle on 7 February 1809 and St Helena on 29 April, before arriving at the Downs on 13 July.

On her return voyage Sir William Bensley was part of a convoy of seven regular ships of the EIC and eight extra ships under Royal Navy escort. Near Mauritius on 14 March the convoy ran into a hurricane and ultimately four EIC regular ships were lost: Calcutta, Bengal, Jane, Duchess of Gordon, and Lady Jane Dundas (Note: All four were of about 820 tons (bm), so larger than Sir William Bensley. The EIC valued the cargoes lost, in order, at: £121,262, £124,452, £86,089, and £38,808. A later report could find no common cause except that the four separated together from the rest of the convoy and might have encountered a second gale.) The hull of one was sighted in October but it sank before the name could be identified. Sir William Bensley had to throw 12 of her guns overboard in order to stay afloat.

=== EIC Voyage #5 (1810–1811) ===
Captain Hooper sailed from Portsmouth on 13 April 1810, bound for Madras and Bengal. Sir William Bensley reached Madeira on 19 May and Madras on 12 October, and arrived at Calcutta on 12 November. She was at Saugor on 27 December. She reached Vizagaptam on 31 January 1811, Masulipatam on 18 February, and Madras on 26 February. She reached St Helena on 16 June, and arrived at the Downs on 30 August.

=== EIC Voyage #6 (1812–1813) ===
Captain Albert Gladstanes (or Gledstanes) received a letter of marque on 6 February 1812. He sailed from Portsmouth on 8 April, bound for Madras and Bengal. On 30 April Sir William Bensley, Sovereign, Harriet, and City of London were at 25°40′N 23°5′W and under escort by HMS Hotspur, which parted from them and returned to England.

Sir William Bensley reached Madras on 2 August and arrived at Calcutta on 11 September. She was at Saugor on 2 November, reached St Helena on 13 February 1813, and arrived at the Downs on 14 May.

== Merchantman ==
On her return to England, Burrowes sold Sir William Bensley to St Barbe & Co. for use as a London-based transport.

On 2 December 1813 Sir William Bensley, Wilkins, master, rescued the crew of George. The two vessels had left Quebec City in company, bound for London, when George when lost her rudder and sprang a leak, forcing her crew to abandon her. George's crew consisted of her master, Horie, and 21 men.

On 14 December an American privateer of 20 guns approached and engaged for 40 minutes, but then sheared off.

About a week later the rescued men were able seriously to assist Sir William Bensley. She and Captain Marmaduke Wilkins were at 35°5′N 48°46′W when an American privateer schooner of 20 guns attacked them at about 1:10pm. An action ensued that lasted until about 3:40pm during which George's crew assisted fully in manning the ship and guns, helping Sir William Bensley to repel the attack. She suffered only one casualty, a man slightly wounded by a splinter of grapeshot. After the privateer left, damage assessment showed substantial damage to her rigging, some shot between wind and water, and damage to her copper plates.

=== Convict transport (1816–1817) ===
In 1816 Sir William Bensley received a new master, Williams, and sailed for Botany Bay. She received the lowest per ton charter rate of 1816, £4 19s 6d. Captain Lew E. Williams left Portsmouth on 9 October and arrived at Port Jackson on 10 March 1817. She had embarked 200 male convicts and she lost only one en route. One officer and 32 other ranks from the 46th Regiment of Foot provided the guard. One passenger was William Sorell, who became the third Lieutenant-Governor of Van Diemen's Land. Sir William Bensley left Port Jackson on 8 May bound for Bengal.

=== Merchantman ===
In 1821 St Barbe sold Sir William Bensley to her captain, and her trade changed from London—India to London—Quebec. The next year her captain sold Sir William Bensley to Tindall & Co., London.

== Fate ==
Sir William Bensley wrecked on 18 October 1841 at Sandy Cove, Digby, Nova Scotia, British North America.
