= Transport vessels for the invasion of Java (1811) =

For the invasion of Java (1811), under the auspices of Lord Minto, the British government hired a number of transport vessels. Most of the transports were "country ships". Country ships were vessels that were registered in ports of British India such as Bombay and Calcutta, and that traded around India, with Southeast Asia, and China, but that did not sail to England without special authorization from the EIC. In addition, some of the transports for the invasion were "regular ships" of the British East India Company (EIC), and some were "extra ships". Regular ships were on a long-term contract with the EIC, and extra ships were vessels the EIC had chartered for one or more voyages.

The data in the table below comes primarily from two sources. An 1814 report from a Select Committee of the House of Commons of the British Parliament provided the data only on country ships, giving the names of a large number of vessels, and their burthen (bm). Then the Naval Chronicle published a list of vessels than had assembled at Malacca in May–June 1811 and then sailed for Java. The list in the Naval Chronicle also included the names of British Royal Navy warships, EIC warships, and other EIC vessels, particularly regular and extra ships. A number of transports in the Select Committee report do not show up as having sailed from Malacca. Equally, a number of transports in the Naval Chronicle list are not in the Select Committee report. Transports without burthen data are in the Naval Chronicle but not in the Select Committee report.

Names of vessels that appear in both lists do not always agree. Some vessels in the Select Committee report that have compound names such as "Bombay Anna" or "Arab Mary" appear in the Naval Chronicle as Bombay and Anna, and as Arab and Mary. Also, transliteration of non-English names shows no consistency across sources, making it extremely difficult to try to find more information about the vessels in question.

Many of the transports gathered at Malacca and then left in four divisions on the following days:

- 1st division: 7 June 1811
- 2nd division: 11 June
- 3rd division: 14 June
- 4th division: 17 June

Name	Burthen	Division	Notes
Alexander	750	3	Lost on the Bill of Portland 1815
Ann	403	4	Built at Pegu?
Bombay Anna	955	2	Lost at sea 1815-16
Anne	405	4	Possibly victualer
Antipodes	70		
Asia	992	3	
Asia Felix	324	3	
Batavia	600	1	EIC extra ship
Betsey	330	4	Hired transport
Betsey	175	3	Hired brig
Borneo	365	4	Possibly a victualer; lost at Madagascar 1814
Britannia	170	1	
Cawdry		4	
Charles Baillie	200		
Charlotte	248	4	Foundered in Madras Roads October 1818
Cornwallis	653	2	
Countess of Harcourt	501	1	
Derie Beggi / Derea Beggye	500	4	Foundered 1838
Duncan	400	3	Built at Beypour in 1803
Estambool / Estaenboole	310	4	
Fattahoul Khyer / Footahoolkeer	368	4	
Fifeshire	501		
Fleetwood	350	1	ex-Jessy (Calcutta; 1802); broken up at Calcutta in 1815.
Fort William	1160	1	
Friendship	872	3	Lost on the Nicobars, 1819
Futteh Almoneen	490		
Harmoody	415	2	
Harriot / Harriet?	488		Built at Pegu?
Huddart	565	2	EIC regular ship
Hugh Inglis	821	2	EIC regular ship
James Drummond	669	3	Built at Demaun 1800 as Adam Smith; broken up at Calcutta, 1823.
Kheeleel / Keleel	310	4	
Lord Eldon	571	3	EIC extra ship
Lowjee Family	926	3	Destroyed by fire in Bombay Harbour, 1849
Macauley	264	4	
Marchioness Wellesley / Marchioness of Wellesley	510 / 581		Broken up 1821, or 1824
Margaret and Francis	305	1	
Mary	250	4	Lost on the John and Margaretta Shoal 1823.
Mary	400		
Arab Mary	350	2	
Matilda	762	2	Wrecked March 1822
Mentor	400		
Minerva brig	160		
Minto	190	4	EIC-hired agent vessel
Mornington	770	4	Built at Calcutta
Mysore	831 / 900	2	Built Pegu 1795: Lost off Pulo Sapata on 7 December 1818
Nadir Shah	518		
Northumberland	600	4	EIC extra ship
Olive (or hired brig Olivia)	420	4	Captured 1806; returned to British hands
Perseverance	280	4	
Phoenix	336		
Phoenix	818	3	EIC regular ship
Preston	671	4	EIC regular ship
Resource	400	3	Captured 1807; (Note: The French frigate Piémontaise captured Resource on 9 October 1807. She was carrying toile and 7,500 sacks of rice. The value of the prize was 215,930.24 francs.) Returned to British ownership; registered at Calcutta prior to January 1811
Substitute		4	
Sullimany, or Solimany	689	3	Launched at Demaun
Sullimany	350		
Sultana	300	3	
Sundany	430	1	
Thomas Henchman	517		Burnt 1811 at Malacca on the expedition to Java
Troubridge	800	2	
Venus	250	2	Captured by USS Peacock in 1815; later returned to British ownership
Wellesley		3	
William Pitt	819	1	EIC regular ship
Windham	833	1	Wrecked September 1815
