= Transport vessels for the British invasions of Isle Bourbon and Isle de France =

British authorities hired several transport vessels for the invasions of Isle Bonaparte and Isle de France in 1810. Most of the hired vessels were "country ships", British merchantmen which were registered in British Indian ports such as Bombay and Calcutta and traded in the East Indies but did not sail to Europe without special authorisation from the East India Company (EIC). The rest consisted of a mixture of EIC East Indiamen and "extra ships"; East Indiamen were on a long-term contract with the EIC, and extra ships were vessels the EIC had chartered for one or more voyages.

The data in the table below comes primarily from an 1814 report from a Select Committee of the House of Commons of the British Parliament, which provided the data only on country ships, giving the names of a large number of vessels, and their burthen (bm). Also, transliteration of non-English names shows no consistency across sources, making it extremely difficult to try to find more information about the vessels in question. The British government chartered some nine of these vessels as cartels to carry back to France the French troops that they had captured in these campaigns. An asterisk after the name in the table below designates the vessels.

== Country ships ==
| Name | Burthen | Where built | Notes |
|---|---|---|---|
| Anna* | 684 | Calcutta | "Bengal Anna"; lost 1811 |
| Bheemoolah | 500/520 | Calcutta | |
| Borneo | 365/382/400 | Built at Pegu; | Lost on Madagascar in 1814 |
| Cape of Good Hope / Good Hope* | 388 | Calcutta, 1806 | Aboukir, captured in 1808, of Calcutta again in 1809. Later renamed. |
| Castlereagh (or Lord Castlereagh*) | 750 | Cochin, 1803 | |
| Charlotte | 248 | | Foundered in Madras Roads October 1818 |
| Coromandel | 500 | Built at Chittagong; | Foundered 1821 |
| Cornwall | 802/795 | Howrah (Calcutta), 1810 | |
| Emma* | 440 | Calcutta | Serving as a "Government armed ship", Captain Street. |
| Hamoody / Harmoody | 415 | | |
| Helen* | 300 | Pegu, 1807 | Lost at Fultah, 1817 |
| General Wellesley | 430 | Calcutta, 1803 | Captured December 1814 and sank January 1815 |
| Lady Barlow* | 420/450 | Pegu/Rangoon, | Broken up at Calcutta, 1822 |
| Marian | 350 | Calcutta, 1800 | |
| Palmer | 184 / 200 | Chittagong, 1810 | Lost 1812 |
| Portsea* | 320 | Calcutta | Last listed 1844 |
| Sir William Burroughs* | 500 / 620 | Calcutta, 1803 | Captured 1808; (Note: The privateer captain Robert Surcouf, in Revenant, had captured the 10-gun Sir William Burroughs on 18 December 1807.) William Burroughs of "1000 tons" (bm) was recaptured at Île de France on 3 December 1810. |
| Troubridge | 804 | | |
| Union | 300 | Possibly the French privateer that HMS Culloden captured on 5 July 1808 off Ceylon. | |
| Upton Castle* | 627 | Bombay | Burnt 1817 |
| Venus | 250 / 350 | Chittagong | Captured by USS Peacock in 1815; later returned to British ownership |

The report in Lloyd's List of the cartel ships states that there was another vessel of unknown name that had also arrived at Morlaix as a cartel. The vessel was probably the transport Ranger, which the French had captured on 23 August and the Royal Navy had recaptured on 4 September. On 17 June 1811, Ranger had arrived at Plymouth. She had come as a cartel from Mauritius and Morlaix.

== East Indiamen ==
| Name | Burthen | Master | Notes |
|---|---|---|---|
| City of London | 820 | Joseph Yates | Yates died on shore on the first day of the invasion |
| Euphrates | 596 | Philip Herbert | Sailed to Bengal, then back to Madras and Mauritius, and then to England |
| Hugh Inglis | 821 | John Wood | Returned to India and then participated in the invasion of Java (1811) |
| Huddart | 547 | William Nesbitt | Returned to India and then participated in the invasion of Java (1811) |
| Phoenix | 861 | John Ramsden | Returned to India and then participated in the invasion of Java (1811) |
| Preston | 671 | Henry Sturrock | Returned to India and then participated in the invasion of Java (1811) |
| Sir Stephen Lushington | 608 | Captain James Hay | Returned to Madras and then resumed journey to Britain |

== Non-European vessels ==
- Futteh Romer
- Grab Naseery
- Solomunshaw

== Precedent ==
In 1794 the British government had contemplated an invasion of Mauritius but had cancelled the plan in May. It had intended to use East Indiamen about to sail from England to India and China. One suspects that the logistics of such an operation proved too daunting.
