= City of London (disambiguation) =

The City of London is the historic centre and main financial district of London, England. It is nicknamed "the Square Mile" due to its size.

City of London may also refer to:

== Places and organizations ==
=== United Kingdom ===
- City of London (London County Council constituency), 1889–1949
- City of London (Parliament of England constituency), 1298–1707
- City of London (UK Parliament constituency), 1707–1950
- City of London Corporation, the governing body of the City of London, England
- London, the capital city of England and the United Kingdom

=== Elsewhere ===
- London, Ontario, Canada
- London, Arkansas, US
- London, Kentucky, US
- London, Ohio, US

== Ships ==
- City of London (ship), several ships, including:
  - City of London (1800 Indiaman), a merchant ship
  - City of London (1801 ship), a West Indiaman
  - SS City of London, a passenger steamship 1863–1881

== See also ==
- London City (disambiguation)
- London (disambiguation)
- City of London Academy (disambiguation), four academies established in inner London
