= Borneo (ship) =

Several vessels, mercantile and naval, have been named Borneo for the island of Borneo:

== Merchant ==
- Borneo (1713 ship), was launched on the Thames and made two voyages (1713–1716, and 1718–1720), for the British East India Company to Borneo and Bencoolen before transferring to the West Indies trade.
- Borneo, of 350, 382, or 400 tons (bm), was a country ship, probably launched at Pegu after 1809, that served as a transport for the British invasions of Mauritius (1810) and Java (1811). She appeared, with Benjamin Ferguson, master, on a list of vessels registered at Calcutta in January 1811. She was lost at Madagascar in 1814.
- Borneo (1817 ship) was a merchant ship built in Borneo that undertook one voyage transporting convicts to Van Diemen's Land in 1828. She was wrecked in 1832 on her first whaling voyage.
- Borneo, of 223 tons (bm), left Boston in December 1817 on a fur hunting voyage. A gale wrecked her on 28 January 1819 at Cape Muzon, Alaska; crew saved.
- Borneo, of 297 tons (bm) was launched at Salem, Massachusetts, in 1831; her crew abandoned her in the North Atlantic on 1 January 1854.
- Borneo, of 3,685 GRT, was a cargo steamship launched in Scotland in 1900, renamed Kerkenna in 1917, renamed Mount Summit in 1921, and scrapped in 1963.

== Naval ==
- HNLMS Borneo, gunboat of the Royal Netherlands Navy, launched 1892
- HMT Borneo (FY 1809), was a trawler launched in 1905 for Grant & Robinson, Grimsby, (GY115). The British Royal Navy requisitioned her in November 1914. She struck a naval mine off Beachy Head on 18 June 1917 that SM UC-17 had laid earlier that day. Borneo was lost with 11 of her 14 crew.
