= Windham (ship) =

At least two vessels have been named Windham (or Wyndham):

- Windham was launched in 1800 and made six voyages for the British East India Company before the Chilean Navy purchased her in 1818. The Chileans sold her in 1828.
- Windham (1808 ship) was a country ship built at Demaun. In 1815 she wrecked on Brunswick Rock.
