= City of London Academy =

The City of London Academy is the name given to six academy schools established in inner London with the support of the City of London Corporation (CLC):

- City of London Academy Highbury Grove
- City of London Academy Highgate Hill
- City of London Academy Islington
- City of London Academy, Shoreditch Park
- City of London Academy, Southwark
- City of London Primary Academy, Islington

== See also ==
- City Academy, Hackney
- Newham Collegiate Sixth Form Centre
