= Jean-Chrysostôme Bruneteau de Sainte-Suzanne =

- Born: 4 March 1773; Poivres
- Died: 2 August 1830 (aged 57); Clermont-Ferrand
- Cause of death: Suicide
- Relatives: Gilles Joseph Martin Bruneteau (brother)

Baron Jean-Chrysostôme Bruneteau de Sainte-Suzanne (French pronunciation: [ʒɑ̃ kʁizɔstom bʁynto də sɛ̃t syzan]; 4 March 1773, Poivres – 2 August 1830 Clermont-Ferrand) was a French Empire baron and general.

== Biography ==
Jean-Chrysostôme Bruneteau de Sainte-Suzanne was born into a family of officers of the low nobility. He is the brother of Gilles Joseph Martin Bruneteau.

=== First Republic ===
He joined the Army on 10 July 1789 in the Anjou infantry regiment. He was promoted to sous-lieutenant on 16 September 1791, and to lieutenant on 12 October. Serving the Armée du Rhin, he took part with Custine in the capture of Speyer and Mainz in 1792. He rose to captain on 18 October 1793, taking part in the sieges of Dunkirk and Maubeuge, and in several skirmishes in the region.

Bruneteau was relieved of duty on 14 February 1794, during the Reign of Terror, for being nobility. He was reinstated at the Thermidorian Reaction.

In 1796, he joined the Army of Italy, taking part in the Battle of the Bridge of Arcole and in the Battle of Rivoli.

In 1798, he was transferred to the Army of the West, before returning to Italy. He took part in the Battle of Cassano and in the Battle of Novi on 15 August 1799, where he received a battlefield promotion to chef de bataillon (major). The rank was confirmed on 2 May 1800. He was then transferred to the Army of the Rhine, where he took part in several skirmishes.

In 1802, he took part in several skirmishes with the flotilla of Boulogne.

On 28 February 1803, he departed for India, arriving at Île de France in August. From 1803 to 1805, he headed the infantry of the expeditionary corps in India.

=== First Empire ===
On 24 August 1805, he was promoted to colonel. He was made governor of Île Bonaparte on 9 October 1809, a position he held until the Invasion of Île Bonaparte on 8 July 1810. Bruneteau fought the 7000 men of the invasion force with 300 line infantrymen and 300 mobile National guards, the militia being dispersed over the island. He surrendered after Saint-Denis was half under the control of the British.

Bruneteau returned to France in November 1810. An enquiry deemed the capitulation of Île Bonaparte to be "most honourable", and he received the command of an infantry regiment.

In 1812, he took part in the French invasion of Russia, notably fighting at Smolensk and at the Battle of Berezina, where he was captured by the Russians. He was back in France on 26 June 1814, having been made a Baron of Empire on 8 April 1813.

=== Restauration ===
After the Bourbon Restauration, on 6 September 1814, he was promoted to maréchal de camp, and he received the command of the fortress of Landau, a position which he held from 11 December 1814 to 30 March 1815.

During the Hundred Days, Bruneteau rallied to Napoleon, and was promoted to brigade general in the imperial decree of 10 June 1815. He took command of the fortress of Sélestat on 4 May, with a 4000-strong garrison. He was besieged by 9000 men during two months. Refusing to surrender to foreign troops, he repelled two direct assaults, and managed to conquer the headquarters of the besiegers, before surrendering to Louis XVIII on 1 October.

At the second Restauration, Bruneteau was suspended from the Army. He headed the department of Corrèze, from 26 June to 18 August 1816, and again from 25 December 1816 to 12 November 1817. He then headed the subdivisions of the 19th military division.

Bruneteau committed suicide by pistol shot to the head on 2 August 1830, after the July Revolution.

== In fiction ==
Saint-Suzanne's role as governor of Île Bonaparte when the British took over in 1810 is part of The Mauritius Command by Patrick O'Brian, where he is called Colonel Saint-Susanne

== Honours ==
- Knight of the Legion of Honour on 19 December 1811
- Officier of the Legion of Honour on 4 December 1816
- Commander of the Legion of Honour on 29 October 1826
- Knight of the Order of Saint Louis on 26 October 1814

== Sources and references ==
- (in French) Dictionnaire historique et biographique des généraux français, depuis le onzième siècle jusqu'en 1821

p.304

- (in French) BRUNETEAU DE SAINTE-SUZANNE (Jean Chrysostôme)
- (in French) Chrysostome Bruneteau de SAINTE-SUZANNE
