= Marchioness Wellesley (ship) =

Several vessels have been named Marchioness Wellesley (or Marchioness of Wellesley) for one of the wives of the Marquess of Wellesley:

- Marchioness Wellesley (1805 ship) was launched at Calcutta. She initially sailed as a country ship, i.e., only trading east of the Cape of Good Hope. She participated in the 1811 British military expedition to Java. In 1815 she sailed to England and then sailed between England and India under a license from the British East India Company (EIC). She was broken up in 1821 or 1824.
- Marchioness Wellesley (1826 ship) was a steam packet launched for the Dublin and Wexford Steam Co. She grounded in 1827 but was salvaged. She was last listed in 1838.
