= Borno =

Borno may refer to:

== Places ==
=== Italy ===
- Borno, Lombardy, a municipality in the Province of Brescia

=== Africa ===
- Bornu (historical region)
- Kanem–Bornu Empire, a former empire in modern Chad and Nigeria
- Borno Emirate, a traditional Nigerian state formed at the start of the 20th century
- Borno, Nigeria, a state in northeast Nigeria
- Borno, Chad, a canton of the department of Dababa, Chad

== People ==
- Davor Borno, Croatian musician, pop singer and songwriter
- Louis Borno (1865–1942), Haitian politician who served as President of Haiti from 1922 to 1930
- Maurice Borno (1917–1955), Haitian painter
- Trygve Bornø (born 1942). Norwegian international footballer

== Other uses ==
- Borno people, on the list of ethnic groups in Chad
- Borno Youth Movement, a Nigerian political party founded in 1954

== See also ==
- Borneo (disambiguation)
