= Huddart (1803 EIC ship) =

UK merchant ship (1803–1821)

United Kingdom
- Name: Huddart
- Namesake: Joseph Huddart
- Owner: EIC voyages 1&2: John Woolmore; EIC voyages 3-8: Robert Burrowes; 1818:J. Taylor
- Builder: Perry, Wells & Green, Blackwall
- Launched: 8 January 1803
- Fate: Wrecked 1821

General characteristics
- Tons burthen: 547, or 547 74/94, or 565, (bm)
- Length: Overall:124 ft 10 in (38.0 m); Keel:99 ft 9 1/2 in (30.4 m)
- Beam: 32 ft 1 1/2 in (9.8 m)
- Depth of hold: 16 ft 2 in (4.9 m)
- Complement: 1803:60; 1804:55; 1806:50; 1808:60
- Armament: 1803: 12 × 12-pounder guns; 1804: 12 × 12-pounder guns; 1808: 12 × 12-pounder guns; 1810: 12 × 12-pounder guns
- Notes: Two decks

Huddart was launched in 1803 as an East Indiaman. She made eight voyages for the British East India Company (EIC), between 1803 and 1818. In 1810-1811 she participated as a transport in two British military campaigns. In 1818 new owners deployed her in sailing to Canada. She was wrecked there in 1821.

== EIC career ==
On 28 August 1801 John Woolmore and the EIC agreed a contract for Huddart, which was at best still building, for eight voyages at £13 10s per ton as a peacetime freight. (This was without kentledge.)

EIC voyage #1 (1803-1804): Captain Thomas Gabriel Bayliff sailed from The Downs on 21 March 1803, bound for St Helena and Bombay. Huddart reached St Helena on 6 June. Bayliff acquired a letter of marque on 25 July, i.e., in absentia. On 29 August Huddart arrived at Bombay. She visited Mangalore on 24 October, before returning to Bombay on 16 November. Homeward bound, she reached St Helena on 3 March 1804 and arrived in The Downs on 10 May.

EIC voyage #2 (1804-1805): Captain William John Eastfield acquired a letter of marque on 28 July 1804. He sailed from Portsmouth on 4 September 1804, bound for Madras and Bengal. Huddart reached Madeira on 27 September and arrived at Madras on 17 February 1805. She then arrived at Diamond Harbour on 17 March. Homeward bound, she was at Saugor 3 June, reached St Helena on 22 October, and arrived at The Downs on 23 December.

EIC voyage #3 (1806-1807): Captain Thomas Gabriel Bayliff acquired a letter of marque on 14 April 1806. He sailed from Portsmouth on 10 June 1806, bound for Madeira and Bombay. Huddart was at Madeira on 27 June, but did not reach the Cape until 3 October; she arrived at Bombay on 11 January 1807. Homeward bound, she was at 14 Mar Point de Galle or 14 March, reached St Helena on 14 May, and arrived at The Downs on 6 September.

EIC voyage #4 (1808-1809): Captain William Nesbitt acquired a letter of marque on 14 March 1808. He sailed from Portsmouth on 7 May 1808, bound for Bombay. Huddart arrived at Bombay on 19 September. Homeward bound, she was at Point de Galle on 8 February 1809.

On 15 February she sailed from Point de Galle as part of a fleet of 15 East Indiamen under escort by HMS Culloden and HMS Terpsichore.

On 14 March, off Mauritius, a gale developed. Four of the ships, Bengal, Calcutta, Jane, Duchess of Gordon, and Lady Jane Dundas, parted company with the main convoy. They were never heard of again. Huddart was the last vessel to see Bengal and Calcutta; Hugh Inglis was the last vessel to see Jane, Duchess of Gordon and Lady Jane Dundas. The hull of one of the four missing vessels was sighted overturned off Mauritius the following October, but sank before it could be identified.

Huddart reached St Helena on 29 April, and arrived at The Downs on 13 July September.

EIC voyage #5 (1810-1812): Captain Nesbit sailed from Portsmouth on 14 March 1810, in a convoy bound for Madras and Bengal. Huddart reached Madras on 8 July, and arrived at Kedgeree on 27 July. The British government then hired her as a transport for the British Île de France (Mauritius).

On 30 November Huddart was at Mauritius.

Nesbit landed with the invasion force, bringing many of his crew with him, as did Captain Joseph Yates of City of London. The seamen contributed in the "laborious duty of hauling the cannon".

Huddart sailed from Mauritius on 10 December, and arrived at Calcutta on 16 February 1811. There the British government again hired her, this time for the invasion of Java.

Huddart arrived at Malacca on 24 April. She sailed for Java on 11 June as part of the second division of transports. She was at Batavia on 4 August, and returned to Calcutta on 16 October.

Homeward bound, she was at Kedgeree on 3 January 1812, reached St Helena on 12 May, and arrived at The Downs on 22 July.

EIC voyage #6 (1813-1814): Captain Nesbitt sailed from Portsmouth on 14 April 1813, bound for Madras and Bengal. Huddart reached Madras on 9 August and arrived at Calcutta on 19 September. Homeward bound, she was at Saugor on 2 November and Point de Galle on 29 December. She reached the Cape on 1 March 1814 and St Helena on 18 March, and arrived at The Downs on 1 June.

EIC voyage #7 (1815-1816): Captain Charles Weller sailed from The Downs on 2 April 1815, bound for Madras and Bengal. Huddart was at Madeira on 18 April and Madras on 6 August before arriving at Calcutta on 3 September. Homeward bound, albeit indirectly, she was at Saugor on 20 December and Madras again on 14 January 1816. She stopped at Benkulen on 18 February and Batavia on 4 March. She reached St Helena on 18 May and arrived at The Downs on 12 July.

EIC voyage #8 (1817-1818): Captain Weller sailed from The Downs on 16 May 1817, bound for Bombay. Huddart was at Madeira on 1 June Madeira and arrived at Bombay on 30 September. Homeward bound, she was at Tellicherry on 17 December, reached St Helena on 17 March 1818, and arrived at the Downs on 9 June.

== Subsequent career and loss ==
New owners in 1818 employed Huddart in the trade between England and Canada. Lloyd's Register for 1819 shows Huddart's master as F. Oakes, her owner as J. Taylor, and her trade as London–Quebec. The volume for 1821 shows her master as Appleton.

Lloyd's List reported on 16 October 1821 that a gale wind had driven Huddart, Appleton, master, on to the rocks near Wolf’s Cove. Huddart, which had been sailing for London, was apparently a total loss and would be sold, though her cargo would be taken out. On 7 December Lloyd's List reported that Huddart and part of her cargo had been sold.
