= City of London (ship) =

Several vessels have been named City of London for the City of London:

- City of London (1800 Indiaman) was launched as an East Indiaman. She made six voyages for the British East India Company (EIC) between 1800 and 1814 when she was taken up as a troopship for one voyage. She made one more voyage to India under a license from the EIC and then was broken up circa 1817.
- City of London (1801 ship) was launched in Newcastle. She spent most of her career sailing as a West Indiaman. A French privateer captured her in January or February 1806.
- SS City of London (1863), 2,560 GRT, launched in Glasgow in 1863 and lost in 1881.
- SS City of London (1907), 8,956 GRT, a civilian liner completed in 1907 and scrapped in 1946. She was the Armed Merchant Cruiser HMS City of London from 1916 to 1919.

In World War I the Royal Navy also used three other vessels named City of London: a Fishery Reserve vessel, a hired drifter, and a hired trawler.
