= HMS Hotspur (1810) =

Frigate of the Royal Navy

History

United Kingdom
- Name: HMS Hotspur
- Builder: Parsons
- Launched: 13 October 1810
- Fate: Broken-up in January 1821

General characteristics
- Class & type: Fifth-rate 36-gun frigate
- Tons burthen: 952 bm
- Length: 145 ft 0 in (44.2 m)
- Beam: 38 ft 6 in (11.7 m)
- Sail plan: Full-rigged ship

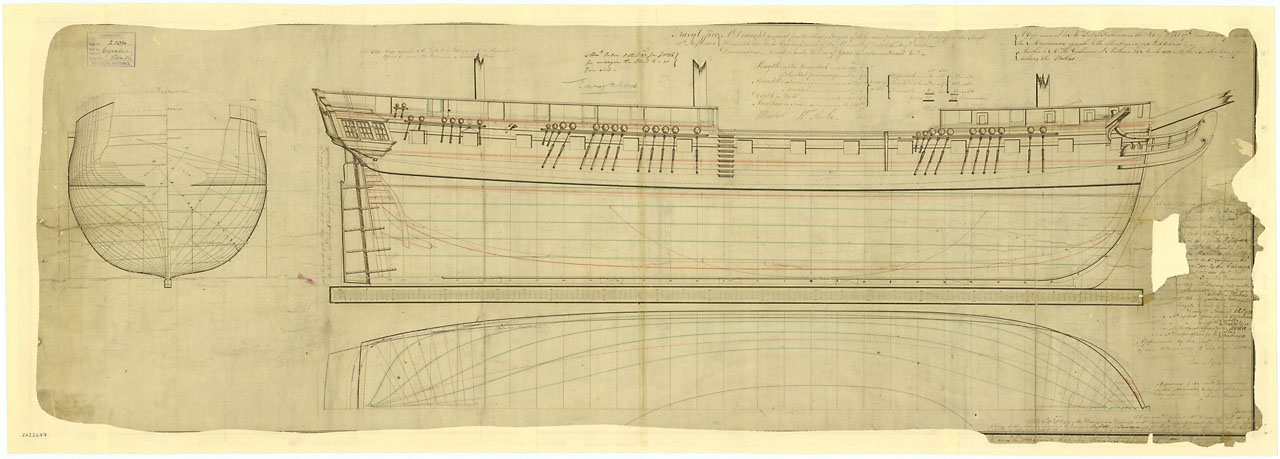
Plan of an Apollo-class frigate dated 1803

HMS Hotspur was a 36-gun Fifth-rate Apollo-class frigate of the Royal Navy, built by Parsons of Warsash and launched on 13 October 1810.

== Career ==
On 25 August 1811, Hotspur and Barbadoes captured Eseperance, of Havre de Grace, and Guillaume Chorede (or Guillaume Chere), from Cherbourg, both laden with timber. The captured vessels arrived in Portsmouth.

On 30 April 1812 Sir William Bensley, Sovereign, Harriet, and City of London were at 25°40′N 23°5′W and under escort by Hotspur, which parted from them and returned to England. The East Indiamen had left England and were on their way to the East Indies.

In 1813 Hotspur was in Buenos Aires under the command of Captain Josceline Percy, the younger son of the Duke of Northumberland. Here George Pegler, an English boy of about 14 joined the crew, having escaped from the crew of a merchant ship. Leaving Buenos Aires, Horatio anchored for a while off the coast of Montevideo, near Isla de Flores, which the crew named Seal Island for the vast numbers of South American fur seals. Parties of 100 or more sailors from Horatio would land on the island every day to hunt the seals. After this, the frigate sailed for Rio de Janeiro and Portsmouth.

On 26 October 1813, Hotspur and Pyramus captured the 225-ton (bm) American letter of marque Chesapeake off Nantes. Captain Joseph Richardson had sailed Chesapeake from America to France and she left Nantes on 18 October 1813. (Note: She had been commissioned at Baltimore on 7 July 1813. She had a crew of 33 and was armed with one 18-pounder gun and four 12-pounder carronades.)

On 25 November the French frigate Sultane and another frigate in company captured Little Catherine as she was sailing from Passages. The French took off Little Catherine's crew and abandoned her. On 28 November Hotspur picked her up at sea. (Note: A first-class share of the salvage money was worth £46 10s 9½d; a sixth-class share, that of an ordinary seaman, was worth £9 6s 2d.)

== Fate ==
Hotspur was broken up in January 1821.
