= Hugh Inglis (1799 EIC ship) =

British Indiaman (ship) 1799–1817

Great Britain
- Name: Hugh Inglis
- Namesake: Hugh Inglis
- Owner: Launched by the Executors of William Cleverley, Gravesend, for Matthew White; EIC voyages #1-2: Matthew White; EIC voyages #3-7: Henry Bonham
- Builder: Cleverly
- Launched: 12 December 1799
- Fate: Sold for breaking up in 1817

General characteristics
- Tons burthen: 820, or 821, or 821 23/94, or 868, (bm)
- Length: Overall:146 ft 1 in (44.5 m); Keel:118 ft 7 in (36.1 m)
- Beam: 36 ft 1 in (11.0 m)
- Depth of hold: 14 ft 8 in (4.5 m)
- Complement: 1800: 99; 1806: 102; 1810: 102; 1813: 105
- Armament: 1800: 26 × 18-pounder guns; 1806: 30 × 18-pounder guns; 1810: 30 × 18-pounder guns; 1813: 30 × 18-pounder guns
- Notes: Three decks

Hugh Inglis was launched in 1799 as an East Indiaman. She made seven voyages for the British East India Company (EIC), between 1800 and 1817. In 1810 and 1811 she participated as a transport in two British military campaigns. She was sold for breaking up in 1817.

== EIC career ==
On 8 August 1798 Matthew White and the EIC agreed a contract for Hugh Inglis, which was at best still building, with a permanent peace freight of £19 17s 6d per ton with kentledge. Without kentledge the freight was £20 7s 6d per ton. There was also a "Surplus" of £10 per ton.

EIC voyage #1 (1800–1801): Captain William Fairfax acquired a letter of marque on 15 February 1800. He sailed from Torbay on 3 May 1800, bound for St Helena and China. Hugh Inglis reached St Helena on 14 August and arrived at Whampoa Anchorage on 22 January 1801. Homeward bound, she crossed the Second Bar on 27 February, reached St Helena on 21 September, and arrived at The Downs on 4 December.

EIC voyage #2 (1803–1805): Captain Fairfax sailed from Portsmouth on 12 March 1803, bound for Madras and Bengal. Hugh Inglis reached Madras on 18 August and arrived at Diamond Harbour on 5 September. Homeward bound, she was at Saugor on 8 March 1804. She parted from the ships from Bengal, heading for Pulo Penang in a leaky state. She was at Penang on 26 April. She left Penang on 10 August in company with Maria and Woodford. She reached St Helena until 15 November and arrived at The Downs on 7 February 1805.

EIC voyage #3 (1806–1807): Captain William Fairfax acquired a letter of marque on 8 February 1806. He sailed from Portsmouth on 4 March 1806, bound for Madras and Bengal. Hugh Inglis reached Madras on 28 June and arrived at Diamond Harbour on 10 July. She was at Saugor on 10 September, stopped at Penang on 17 October, and was back at Kedgeree on 13 December. Homeward bound, she was at Saugor on 23 January 1807, Point de Galle on 15 March, and St Helena on 13 June. She arrived at The Downs on 6 September.

EIC voyage #4 (1808–1809): Captain John Wood acquired a letter of marque on 20 February 1810. He sailed from Portsmouth on 5 March 1808, bound for Madras and Bengal. She was at Simon's Bay on 31 May and Madras on 3 August, and arrived at Diamond Harbour on 22 August, and Calcutta on 24 September. Homeward bound, she was at Diamond Harbour on 23 November and Point de Galle on 7 February 1809.

On 15 February she sailed from Point de Galle as part of a fleet of 15 East Indiamen under escort by HMS Culloden and HMS Terpsichore.

On 14 March 1809, off Mauritius, a gale developed. Four of the ships, Bengal, Calcutta, Jane, Duchess of Gordon, and Lady Jane Dundas, parted company with the main convoy. They were never heard of again. Hugh Inglis was the last vessel to see Jane, Duchess of Gordon and Lady Jane Dundas; Huddart was the last vessel to see Bengal and Calcutta. The hull of one of the four missing vessels was sighted overturned off Mauritius the following October, but sank before it could be identified.

Hugh Inglis reached the Cape on 10 April and St Helena on 30 April; she arrived at The Downs on 13 July.

EIC voyage #5 (1810–1812): Captain Wood sailed from Portsmouth on 14 March 1810, bound for Madras and Bengal. Hugh Inglis reached Madras on 9 July and arrived at Diamond Harbour on 28 July.

There the British government hired her as a transport for the Île de France (Mauritius).

Hugh Inglis was at Saugor on 4 September and Mauritius on 29 November. By 10 February 1811 she was back at Diamond Harbour. There the government again hired her, this time for the invasion of Java.

Hugh Inglis arrived at Malacca on 4 May. She was part of the Second Division of transports and left on 11 June. She was at "Rendezvous Island", Borneo, on 12 July, and Batavia on 10 August. She returned to Calcutta on 31 October. Homeward bound she was at Saugor on 28 December, and on 4 April 1812 "towards England".

Hugh Inglis returned to The Downs in mid-summer 1812. She brought with her two Mauritian slaves, originally from Madagascar, who had stowed away to escape slavery. Once they had been discovered the crew accepted them and named them John and Florrie. When the ship arrived in England they had a little money in their pockets and they disappeared into the Docklands.

EIC voyage #6 (1813–1814): Captain "James" Fairfax acquired a letter of marque on 19 February 1813. Captain William Fairfax sailed from Torbay on 24 March 1813, bound for Madras and Bengal. Hugh Inglis was at Tenerife on 11 April, Johanna on 13 July, Madras on 9 August, and Vizagapatam on 29 August. She arrived at Diamond Harbour on 8 September. Homeward bound, she was at Saugor on 14 December, Madras again on 25 January 1814, Colombo on 14 February, and the Cape on 24 April. She reached St Helena on 19 May and arrived at The Downs on 6 August.

EIC voyage #7 (1816–1817): Captain William Fairfax sailed from The Downs on 17 April 1816, bound for China. Hugh Inglis arrived at Whampoa on 6 September. Homeward bound, she crossed the Second Bar on 21 December, reached St Helena on 20 March 1817, and arrived at The Downs on 29 May.

== Fate ==
On her return in 1817, her owners sold Hugh Inglis for breaking up.
