= Matilda (1803 ship) =

History

United Kingdom
- Name: Matilda
- Owner: 1803:Hogg, Davidson & Co.; 1819:David Ibbister
- Builder: Calcutta, India
- Launched: 24 September 1803
- Fate: Wrecked 5 March 1822

General characteristics
- Tons burthen: 762, or 76250/94, or 774, or 77410/94(bm)
- Length: 131 ft 10 in (40.2 m)
- Beam: 37 ft 1 in (11.3 m)
- Propulsion: Sail
- Complement: 75
- Armament: 12 guns
- Notes: Teak-built three-decker

Matilda was launched at Calcutta in 1803. She spent most of her career in private trade in India or in trading between England and India. She participated in the British invasion of Java (1811) and made one voyage for the British East India Company (EIC). She grounded and was wrecked in March 1822.

== Career ==
Matilda at least twice underwent repairs in England and fitting out for the return voyage to India. In 1804 the cost was £10,085 and in 1806 it was £9,654. Matilda was admitted to the Registry of Great Britain on 2 January 1806. However, she does not appear in the Register of Shipping until 1809.

Matilda appeared for the first time in the Register of Shipping in 1810. Her master was P. Scott, and her owner Bruce & Co.

Matilda, Hogue, Davidson, & Co., owners, appeared in a list of vessels registered at Calcutta in January 1811.

Matilda was one of the transport vessels for the British invasion of Java (1811), conducted under the auspices of Lord Minto. She was in the first division, which left Malacca on 8 June 1811.

In March 1812 a British squadron, consisting of Bucephalus, Cornelia, and Procris, as well as the EIC's warships Mercury and Teignnmouth, and its gunboats Wellington and Young Barracouta, as well as the transports Sandany, Minerva, Matilda, and Mary Ann, sailed from Batavia on a punitive expedition to Palembang, on Sumatra, after the Sultan there massacred Dutch and Malays at the Dutch factory there earlier in the month. The British brought with them detachments from the 59th and 89th Regiments of Foot, the Madras horse artillery and hussars (dismounted), Bengal artillery, two battalions of sepoys, and an Ambonese contingent.

Matilda also appears in the Register of Shipping in 1819 with Hamilton as master and owner.

EIC voyage (1819–1820): Captain William Hamilton sailed from Portsmouth 22 April 1819, bound for China. Matilda arrived at Whampoa Anchorage on 12 September. Homeward bound, she crossed the Second Bar on 23 November, reached Saint Helena on 6 February 1820, and arrived at the Downs on 7 April. She then returned to private trade to India, sailing under a licence from the EIC.

== Fate ==
Matilda left London on 4 August 1821 for Bengal. She was at the Cape of Good Hope on 24 December.

Matilda wrecked on Saugor Sand, River Ganges, on 5 March 1822. The Bengal Pilot Service vessel Guide, Mr. Thomas Yong, master, rescued the passengers and crew. Guide carried them to Kedgeree, arriving there on 7 March.
