= Borneo (disambiguation) =

Borneo is the largest island in Asia.

Borneo may also refer to:

- Borneo (ship), several mercantile and naval ships
- Borneo, Nova Scotia, Canada, a community
- Borneo FC Samarinda, an Indonesian football club
- Borneo, a 1937 documentary film by Martin and Osa Johnson
- "Borneo", a song by Wolfgang Gartner and Aero Chord from the compilation album Monstercat Uncaged Vol. 1, 2017
