= City Academy, Hackney =

The City Academy Hackney
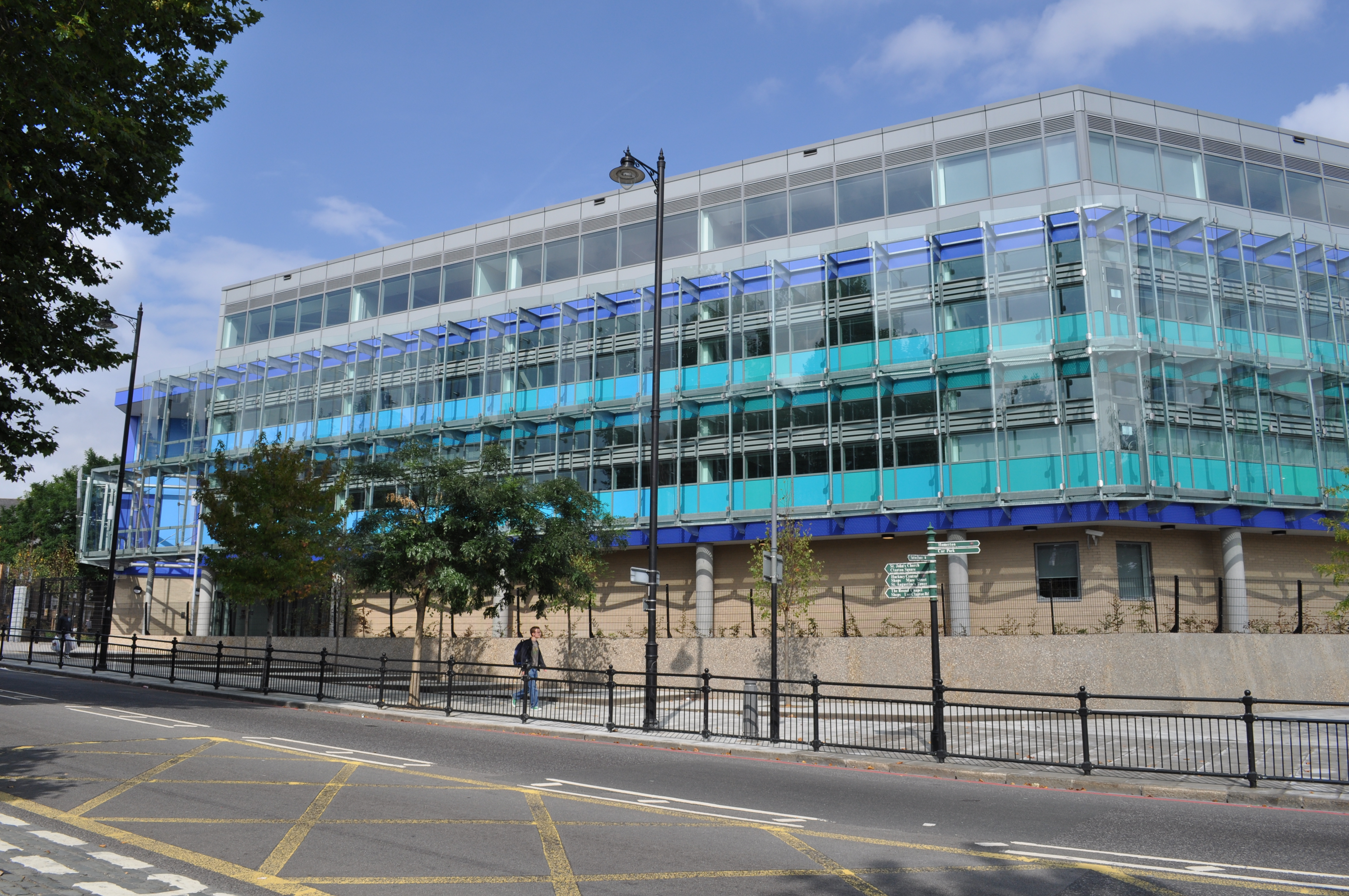

Location
- Homerton Row; Homerton, London, E9 6EA; England; 51.5487°N 0.0493°W

Information
- Type: Academy
- Motto: "Values, Success"
- Established: 2009
- Department for Education URN: 135835 Tables
- Ofsted: Reports
- Principal: Anna Sarchet (2022 - )
- Gender: Coeducational
- Age: 11 to 19
- Houses: Moorgate, Newgate, Aldgate and Ludgate
- Colour: Red Blue 🟥 🟦
- Website: https://www.thecityacademyhackney.org/ /

The City Academy, Hackney is a coeducational secondary school and sixth form with academy status, located in the Homerton area of the London Borough of Hackney, England.

The school was first opened in 2009 in a new building. The school is sponsored by the City of London Corporation and KPMG. Anna Sarchet is the current Academy Principal. The City of London Corporation also sponsors City of London Academy Islington and City of London Academy, Southwark.

City Academy, Hackney has a specialism in business and financial services, but includes the full range of subjects that are found in any state school.

The houses within the school represent that of the doors to the City Of London.

== Standards ==
The school was assessed as “Good” in a 2023 Ofsted inspection.
