= City of London Academy, Southwark =

Secondary school in Bermondsey, London, England

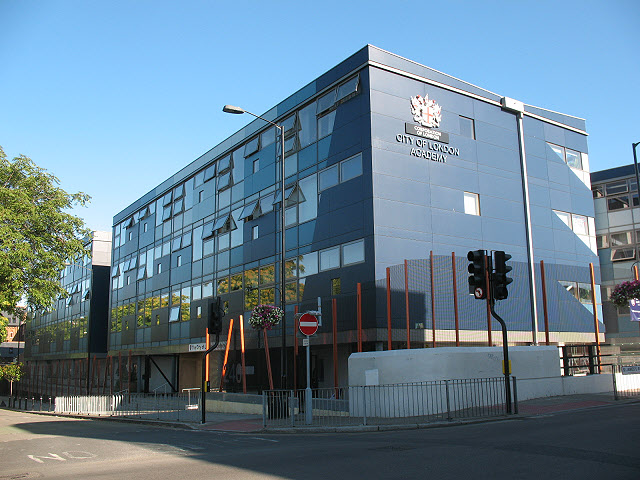

Location
- 240 Lynton Road; Bermondsey, London, SE1 5LA; England
- Coordinates: 51.4892°N 0.0647°W

Information
- Type: Academy
- Established: 2003; 23 years ago
- Department for Education URN: 134222 Tables
- Ofsted: Reports
- Head teacher: Michael Baxter
- Gender: Coeducational
- Age: 11 to 19
- Website: www.cityacademy.co.uk

City of London Academy, Southwark is a co-educational secondary school and sixth form with academy status, located in the Bermondsey area of the London Borough of Southwark, England.

The school was first opened in 2003 and moved to a new building in 2005. The building was designed by Studio E Architects and built by Willmott Dixon. The school is sponsored by the City of London Corporation, along with City Academy, Hackney and City of London Academy Islington.

The school has specialisms in Business and Enterprise and in Sport, and the school teaches the non-curricular subject Business Studies, designed to help pupils become entrepreneurs.

== Catchment area ==
All pupils living in the City of London or Southwark are eligible to attend the school. Some students can board the city bus to the school if they live outside the area.

== Standards ==
A short 2016 Ofsted inspection rated the school as "Good".
