= Newham Collegiate Sixth Form Centre =

Coordinates: 51.5329°N 0.0563°E

Newham Collegiate Sixth Form Centre (The NCS)

Location
- 326 Barking Road; East Ham; London, E6 2BB; England

Information
- Type: Free school sixth form
- Established: 2014
- Local authority: Newham
- Trust: City of London Academies Trust
- Principal: Anita Lomax
- Gender: Co-educational
- Age: 16 to 19
- Capacity: 600
- Website: https://sixthform.london

Newham Collegiate Sixth Form Centre, also known as The NCS, is a free school sixth form college located in East Ham, London, England. Administered by the City of London Academies Trust, it was opened in 2014. The college is coeducational and is affiliated with University College London who is a strategic partner. It was rated “Outstanding” by Ofsted in 2021. It has an ALPS 1 score for value added.

== Curriculum ==
The NCS specializes in the teaching of Maths and the Sciences with nine laboratories for studying the sciences. The centre offers the following A Level courses: Biology, Chemistry, Economics, English Literature, Maths, Further Maths, Geography, Government and Politics, History, Physics, Psychology, and Religious Studies. NCS also provides a "super curriculum" aimed at extending knowledge beyond the A Level syllabus and introducing students to topics they might not otherwise engage with.

== Campus ==
The college is located in a Grade II listed former council building. Surrounding their buildings on the same campus is East Ham Leisure Centre and Library.

== Partnerships and programmes ==
Working with Newham Council, the NCS is the academic A Level centre of a group of partner secondary schools in the borough. These schools are Cumberland, Kingsford, Lister, Little Ilford, Plashet, Rokeby, Royal Docks, Sarah Bonnell, and Stratford School Academy.

On 12 November 2014 UCL announced a strategic partnership with Newham Collegiate Sixth Form Centre. The partnership aligns with the aims of UCL 2034, reflecting UCL’s commitment to being a publicly engaged institution with an interest in the education of London students.

Guest speakers have included Natalie Bennett, Owen Jones, Ed Miliband, Sir Win Bischoff, Gina Miller, Dr Aziz Aboobaker, Annabel Port, Stephen Timms MP, Dr Kenneth Tong, Dr George McGavin, Simon Singh, Shami Chakrabarti, Lord Mervyn King, Robert Winston, Venki Ramakrishnan, Evan Davis and Sir Robin Wales.
