= Brunswick Rock =

Brunswick Rock is a 19th-century name for an obstruction in the Pearl River a little above the First Bar. It received its name after the East Indiaman Brunswick grounded there in 1798. Later other vessels, such as Alfred and Princess Amelia also grounded there. All were refloated. Then in September 1815 the country ship Windham was wrecked on the Brunswick Rock; her crew were rescued. At the time she was on a voyage from Bengal, India to China.

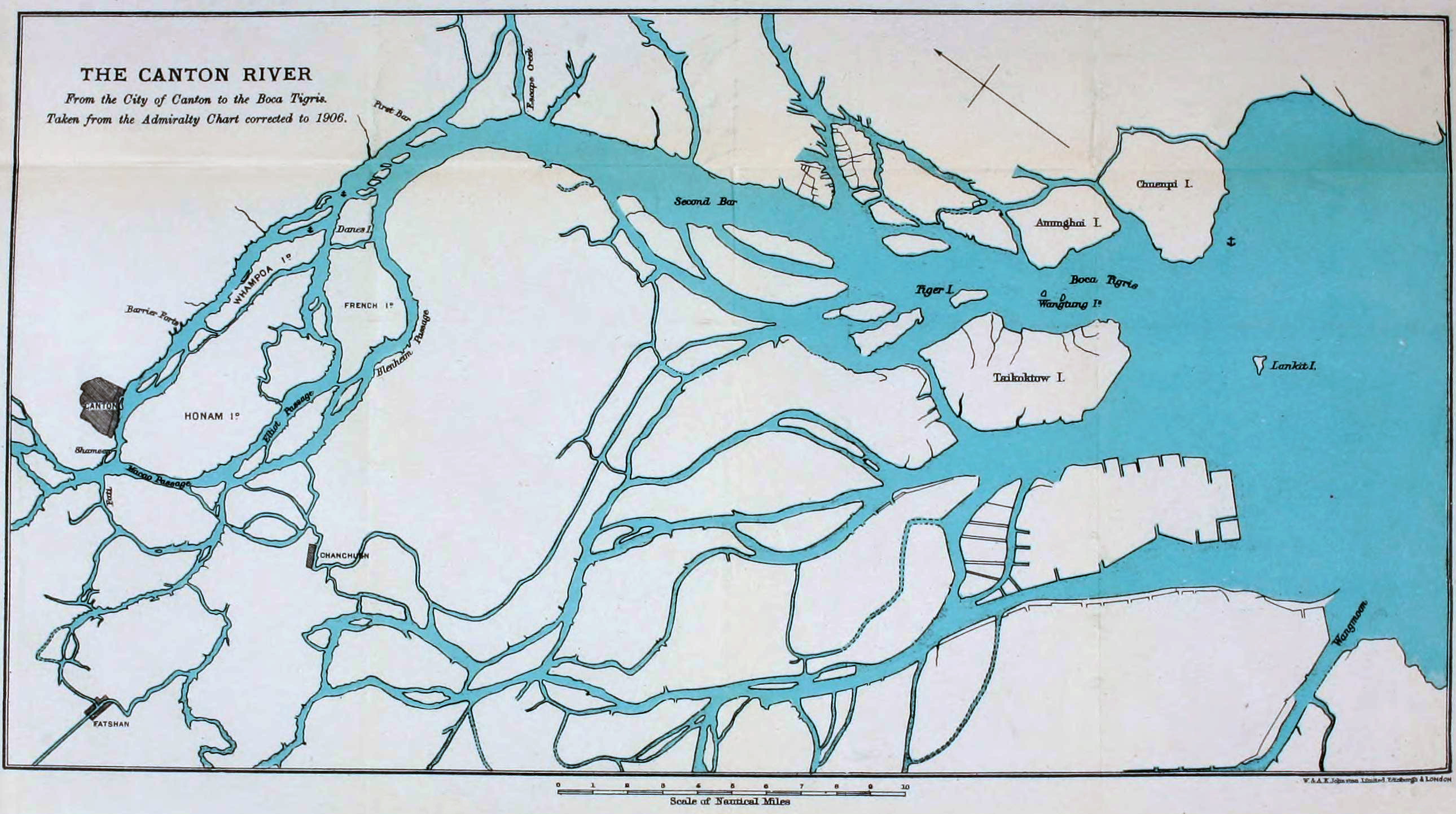
Map of the Pearl River, showing First Bar

During the First Opium War, the British Royal Navy defeated the Qing dynasty Imperial Chinese Navy in the Battle of First Bar in the vicinity.
