= Poivres =

Commune in Grand Est, France

- Commune
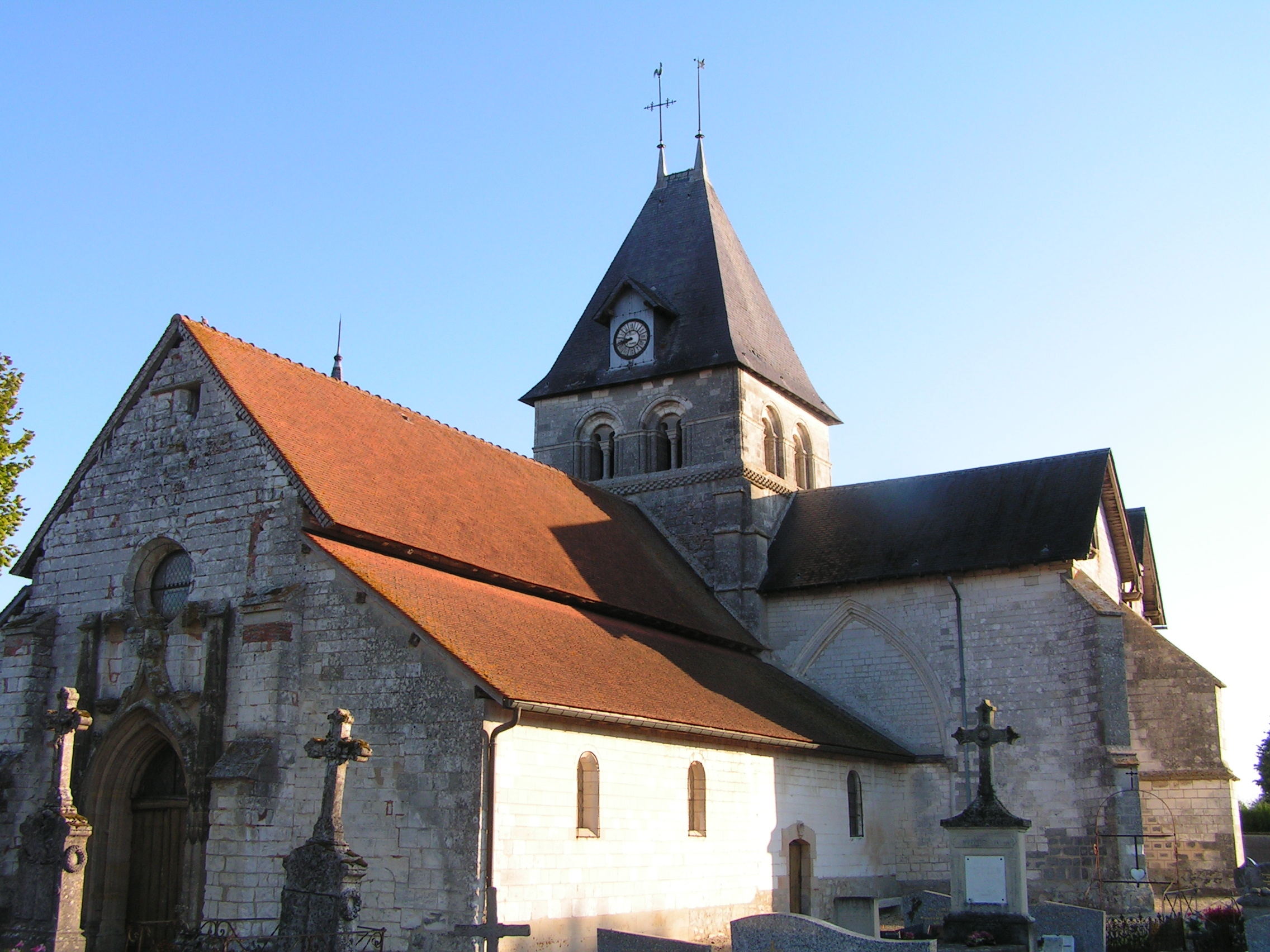
- The church in Poivres
- Location of Poivres
- Location within France Location within Grand Est
- Coordinates: 48°41′03″N 4°15′29″E
- Country: France
- Region: Grand Est
- Department: Aube
- Arrondissement: Troyes
- Canton: Arcis-sur-Aube

Government
  - Mayor (2020–2026): Michel Garcia
- Area^{1}: 42.51 km^{2} (16.41 sq mi)
- Elevation: 140 m (460 ft)
- Population (2023): 154
  - Density: 3.62/km^{2} (9.38/sq mi)
- Time zone: UTC+01:00 (CET)
  - Summer (DST): UTC+02:00 (CEST)
- INSEE/Postal code: 10293 /10700
- ^{1} French Land Register data, which excludes lakes, ponds, glaciers > 1 km^{2} (0.386 sq mi or 247 acres) and river estuaries.

Poivres (French pronunciation: [pwavʁ]) is a commune in the Aube department in north-central France.

== Population ==
Historical population
Year	Pop.	±% p.a.
1968	194	—
1975	183	−0.83%
1982	182	−0.08%
1990	185	+0.20%
1999	155	−1.95%
2007	164	+0.71%
2012	149	−1.90%
2017	159	+1.31%
2023	154	−0.53%
Source: INSEE

== See also ==
- Communes of the Aube department
