= London City =

The term London City may refer to:

- London City Airport, in east London, England
  - London City Airport DLR station
- London City Soccer Club, in London, Ontario
- London City Lionesses, English women's football team
- London City Royals, English basketball team, now defunct

== See also ==
- London, the capital city of England and the UK
  - City of London, a district in central London
- London, Ontario, Canada
  - London City Council, governs London, Ontario
