= Borneo (1713 ship) =

Great Britain
- Name: Borneo
- Namesake: Borneo
- Owner: 1713:Samuel Jones; c.1716:Hugh Raymond
- Launched: August 1713

General characteristics
- Tons burthen: 180/200(bm)
- Complement: 30-40
- Armament: 12 guns
- Notes: There is an earlier Borneo, of 300 tons (bm), that made one voyage for the EIC. The British Library records conflate that vessel and the vessel of this article.

Borneo was launched in 1713 on the River Thames and made two voyages for the British East India Company (EIC) to Banjarmasin, Bencoolen, and Borneo. She then became a West Indiaman.

EIC voyage #1 (1713–1716): Captain Thomas Lewis sailed from The Downs on 2 October 1713, bound for Banjarmasin and Bencoolen. Borneo was at the Cape of Good Hope on 30 January 1714 and reached Batavia on 7 May. She was at Banjarmasin on 1 July and Bencoolen on 26 December. She was then at Bantal on 23 January 1715 before returning to Bencoolen on 9 February. (Note: Bantal (2°45′49.1″S 101°20′01.7″E) is on the west coast of Sumatra in the Moco Moco district, 20 miles SE of Moco Moco and 17 miles NW of Ipuh (2.999301°S 101.484517°E).) She returned to Bantal on 4 March and Bencoolen on 29 March. She then was at Batavia on 13 June and Bencoolen yet again on 24 August. She stopped at Madras on 21 February 1716, and visited Bencoolen for the last time on 30 May. Her voyage ended on 1 August 1717.

EIC voyage #1 (1718–1720): Captain John Riccard (or Ricards) left Plymouth on 24 December 1718, bound for Borneo. Borneo returned to Deptford on 28 September 1720.
