= Marchioness Wellesley (1805 ship) =

1805 ship

History

United Kingdom
- Name: Marchioness Wellesley
- Builder: Thomas Hawkins, Calcutta
- Launched: 5 January 1805
- Fate: Broken up in 1821 or 1824

General characteristics
- Tons burthen: 510, or 538, or 5556/94, or 556, or 581 (bm)
- Length: 118 ft 3 in (36.0 m)
- Beam: 33 ft 0 in (10.1 m)
- Notes: Teak-built

Marchioness Wellesley (or Marchioness of Wellesley) was launched at Calcutta in 1805. She initially sailed as a country ship, i.e., trading east of the Cape of Good Hope. She participated in the 1811 British military expedition to Java. In 1815 she sailed to England and then sailed between England and India under a license from the British East India Company (EIC). She was broken up in 1821 or 1824.

== Career ==
Marchioness Wellesley initially sailed as a country ship, remaining east of the Cape of Good Hope.

Marchioness Wellesley, Gibson, master, left China on 25 March 1807 and arrived at Calcutta on 27 June. In August she left Calcutta with a cargo of cotton. As she sailed between Kedgeree and Saugor a gale caught her and she lost a rudder. Then, as a pilot schooner was towing her to Diamond Harbour to effect repairs she wrecked between Channel Creek and Culpee, where her crew abandoned her. Vessels were sent down to assist. The initial report, in the India Gazette of 13 August stated that it was hoped that a good part of her cargo could be saved, as well as some of her materials and stores. Though there is no follow-up announcement, clearly Marchioness Wellseley was recovered.

In May 1809 Marchioness Wellesley, R. Dickie, delivered to Madras some army officers that she had carried from Bombay. As a token of their appreciation for his care, they gave Dickie a silver cup worth 100 star pagodas.

Marchioness Wellesley was one of the transport vessels supporting the British invasion of Java.

In 1813 the EIC lost its monopoly on the trade between India and Britain. British ships were then free to sail to India or the Indian Ocean under a license from the EIC. Marchioness Wellesley then sailed to England and started sailing between England and India.

When Marchioness Wellesley, John Richards, master, reached Gravesend, the Resident Surgeon visited her. On 11 December 1814 he issued a report to the EIC reporting on the health of the lascars on five recent arrivals, including her. He reported that she had had 102 lascars, one of whom had died and one of whom had deserted. Fifteen arrived sick. The illnesses were all due to the length of the voyage as she had left Bengal on 7 June. The Surgeon pointed out that she had stopped at Île de France for only a few days [leaving on 29 August] and had not acquired much fresh food. She then stopped at Saint Helena [n 6 October] for 36 hours where she only took on water. He described the lascars' accommodations, beds, and bedding as sufficient, though their clothes were worn.

Marchioness Wellesley first appeared in Lloyd's Register (LR) in 1815 with J.Barker, master, Hunter & Co., owner, and trade London–Fort William, India.

On 4 April 1815, Captain J.Barker sailed Marchioness Wellesley to Bengal. Then on 2 April 1816 Captain Maxwell sailed Marchioness Wellesley to Bombay.

| Year | Master | Owner | Trade | Source |
|---|---|---|---|---|
| 1816 | J.Barker; Maxwell | P. Hunter & Co. | London–Fort William | LR |

Lloyd's List (LL) reported in November 1817 that Marchioness Wellesley, Maxwell, master, had run ashore in the Bengal River and had had to put back to repair damages.

| Year | Master | Owner | Trade | Source |
|---|---|---|---|---|
| 1820 | Maxwell | Maxwell | London–Fort William | LR |
| 1823 | T.Baker | D. Hunter & Co. | London–India | Register of Shipping |
| 1823 | Maxwell | Maxwell | London–Fort William | LR |

== Fate ==
Marchioness Wellesley was broken up at Fort Gloster in 1821, or 1824. She was last listed in the registers in 1823, but with discrepant information.
