= City of London (1800 Indiaman) =

Ship

History

Great Britain
- Name: City of London
- Owner: EIC voyages #1-5: Sir William Curtis; EIC voyage #6: Thomas Garland Murray.
- Builder: Randall, Rotherhithe
- Launched: 25 January 1800
- Fate: Last listed c.1817; broken up

General characteristics
- Tons burthen: 820, or 82050/94 or 868 (bm)
- Length: Overall: 146 ft 0 in (44.5 m); Keel:118 ft 5 3/4 in (36.1 m)
- Beam: 36 ft 1 in (11.0 m)
- Depth of hold: 14 ft 11 in (4.5 m)
- Sail plan: Full-rigged ship
- Complement: 1800:102; 1805:110; 1807:105; 1812:100
- Armament: 1800:28 × 18-pounder guns; 1805:8 × 18-pounder guns; 1807:26 × 18-pounder guns; 1812:26 × 18-pounder guns
- Notes: Three decks

City of London was launched in 1800 as an East Indiaman. She made six voyages for the British East India Company (EIC) between 1800 and 1814 when she was taken up as a troopship for one voyage. She made one more voyage to India under a license from the EIC and then was broken up circa 1817.

== Career ==
EIC voyage #1 (1800–1801): Captain Abraham Green acquired a letter of marque on 14 April 1804. He sailed from Torbay on 27 May, bound for Bengal and Madras. City of London was at the Nicobars on 14 November and arrived at Calcutta on 6 December. Homeward bound, she was at Kedgeree on 4 January 1801 and Madras on 13 March and Colombo on 6 April. She reached St Helena on 6 August and arrived at Long Reach on 9 November.

EIC voyage #2 (1803–1804): Captain Samuel London sailed from The Downs on 31 January 1803, bound for St Helena and Bengal. City of London was at St Helena on 3 April, the Cape of Good Hope on 22 May, and Madras on 11 July. She reached Diamond Harbour on 23 July. She was at Saugor on 8 December and left on 10 March 1804. She reached St Helena on 29 June and arrived at Long Reach on 15 October.

EIC voyage #3 (1805–1806): War with France had resumed and so Captain London acquired a letter of marque on 14 April 1805. He sailed from Portsmouth on 25 April 1805, bound for Bombay. City of London arrived at Bombay on 11 August. She left on 8 February 1806 on 14 February stopped at Tellicherry. On 2 March she was at Quillon. She reached St Helena on 14 May and arrived at Long Reach on 22 July.

EIC voyage #4 (1807–1808): Captain Joseph Yates acquired a letter of marque on 24 January 1807. He sailed from Portsmouth on 4 March 1807, bound for Madras and Bengal. City of London reached Madras on 5 July. She arrived at Diamond Harbour on 20 July, and Calcutta on 23 August. Homeward bound, she was at Diamond Harbour again on 24 November and Saugor on 23 December. She reached Point de Galle on 7 March 1808 and St Helena on 8 June. She arrived at Long Reach on 17 August.

EIC voyage #5 (1809–1811): Captain Yates sailed from Portsmouth on 28 April 1809, bound for Madras and Bengal. City of London was at Madeira on 8 May, reached Madras on 15 September, and arrived at Diamond Harbour on 22 October. She then traded in the region. She was at Saugor on 13 December, Vizagapatam on 31 December, Masulipatam on 9 January 1810, Madras on 13 January, Benkulen on 20 March, Kidderpore on 24 June, and Saugor on 9 September. The voyage ended on ended on 2 October 1811.

What happened was that the British government hired a number of transport vessels for the invasions of Île Bourbon and Île de France (Mauritius). Most of the transports were "country ships". Country ships were vessels that were registered in ports of British India such as Bombay and Calcutta, and that traded around India, with Southeast Asia, and China, but that did not sail to England without special authorization from the EIC. In addition, some of the vessels the Government hired were EIC ships such as City of London.

Yates landed with the invasion force, bringing many of his crew with him, as did Captain William Nesbit of Huddart. The seamen contributed in the "laborious duty of hauling the cannon". However, Yates died of exhaustion on shore on the first day of the invasion.

City of London arrived back at Gravesend on 1 October 1811, "From Bengal".

EIC voyage #6 (1812–1813 ): Captain Thomas Jenkins acquired a letter of marque on 8 April 1812. He sailed from Portsmouth on 8 April 1812, bound for Madras and Bengal. On 30 April City of London, Sovereign, Harriet, and Sir William Bensley were at 25°40′N 23°5′W and under escort by HMS Hotspur, which parted from them and returned to England. City of London reached Madras on 1 August and arrived at Diamond Harbour on 8 September. On 6 October she was at Kidderpore and on 4 November Calcutta. Homeward bound, on 10 December she was at Saugor. She was Vizagapatam on 17 January 1813 and Masulipatam on 27 January. She was again at Madras on 3 February. She was at Colombo on 3 March, reached St Helena on 8 June, and arrived at Purfleet on 13 August.

== Licensed ship ==
In 1814 the Government took her up for one voyage as a troopship. On 23 June City of London, Hammond, master, sailed from Portsmouth for Madeira.

Hackman states that at the end of that contract she was sold for breaking up. However, she was not.

A list of ships sailing under a license from the EIC shows City of London, Jenkins, master, sailing from London on 18 May 1815, bound for Île de France, Madras, and Bengal. She arrived at Bengal on 11 November. She was also reported to have sailed from Bengal on 27 January 1816 for Madras and London. On 11 July she was at Deal, having sailed from Bengal (29 January) via Madras (26 February), the Cape (4 May), and St. Helena (17 May). On 14 July City of London arrived at Gravesend.

Jenkins may have intended to sail from London for Île de France, Madras, and Bengal on 15 November. However, there is no sign of any such voyage in the Lloyd's List SAD data.

== Fate ==
City of London was last listed in Lloyd's Register in 1817. She continued to be listed in the Register of Shipping for a few more years.
