= Invasion of Isle Bonaparte =

1810 battle of the Mauritius campaign of 1809–1811

- Part of the Mauritius campaign of 1809–1811
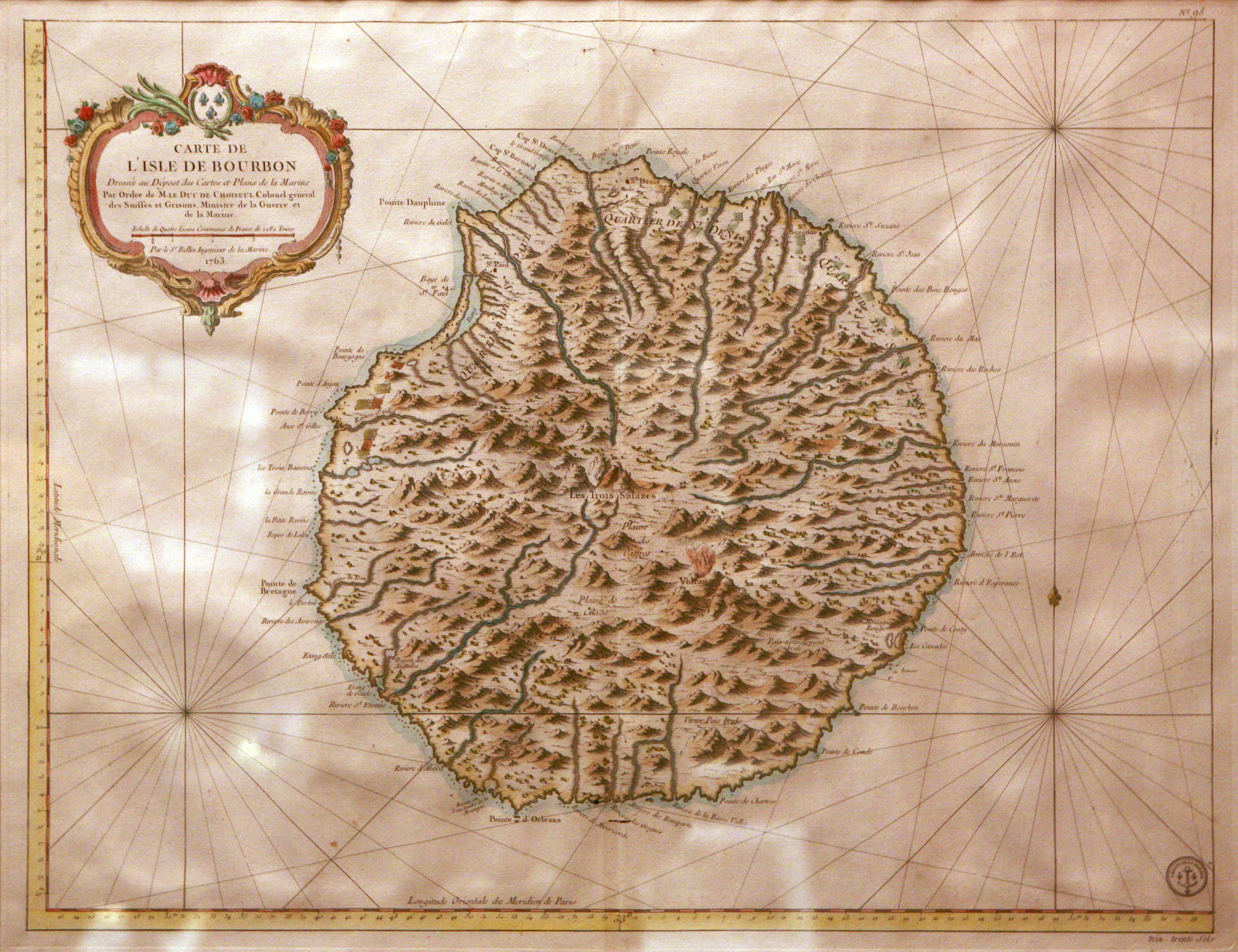
- 1763 map of Isle Bonaparte
| Date | 7–9 July 1810 |
| Location | Isle Bonaparte, Mascarene Islands |
| Result | British victory |
| Territorial changes | British occupation of Isle Bonaparte |

Belligerents
| United Kingdom; East India Company | France |

Commanders and leaders
| Josias Rowley; Henry Sheehy Keating | Chrysostôme de Sainte-Suzanne (surrendered) |

Strength
| 3,650 regulars 5 frigates | 576 regulars 2,717 militia |

Casualties and losses
| 22 killed 79 wounded | Unknown |

The invasion of Isle Bonaparte was an amphibious operation in 1810 that formed an important part of the British campaign to blockade and capture the French Indian Ocean colonies of Isle Bonaparte and Isle de France during the Napoleonic Wars. These islands formed a fortified base for a French frigate squadron under Commodore Jacques Hamelin to raid British convoys of East Indiamen travelling between Britain and British India. Hamelin's ships had destroyed two convoys the previous year despite the attention of a squadron of Royal Navy ships under Commodore Josias Rowley. Rowley had responded by raiding the fortified anchorage of Saint Paul on Isle Bonaparte, capturing one of Hamelin's frigates and recapturing two British East Indiamen.

The raid had an unforeseen consequence, when the commander of Isle Bonaparte General Nicolas Des Bruslys, committed suicide rather than lead the garrison against the British landing parties. This encouraged Rowley to consider a larger operation to seize the whole island. Using the small British-held island of Rodriguez as a base, Rowley and his British Army counterpart Lieutenant-Colonel Henry Sheehy Keating planned to land two forces either side of the island's capital Saint Denis and force the governor to capitulate before the island's militia could be mobilised against them.

The plan was launched on 7 July 1810 as two combined forces of British sailors, soldiers, sepoys and Royal Marines landed at separate beaches. Although a number of men were drowned in the heavy surf, the majority of the invasion force reached the beaches safely and marched inland, attacking French outposts as they approached the capital. Recognising that his demoralised garrison would be unable to defend Saint Denis and that the militia would take too long to mobilise, the French commander Colonel Chrysostôme de Sainte-Suzanne surrendered the island, its garrison and its stores to Rowley.

== Background ==
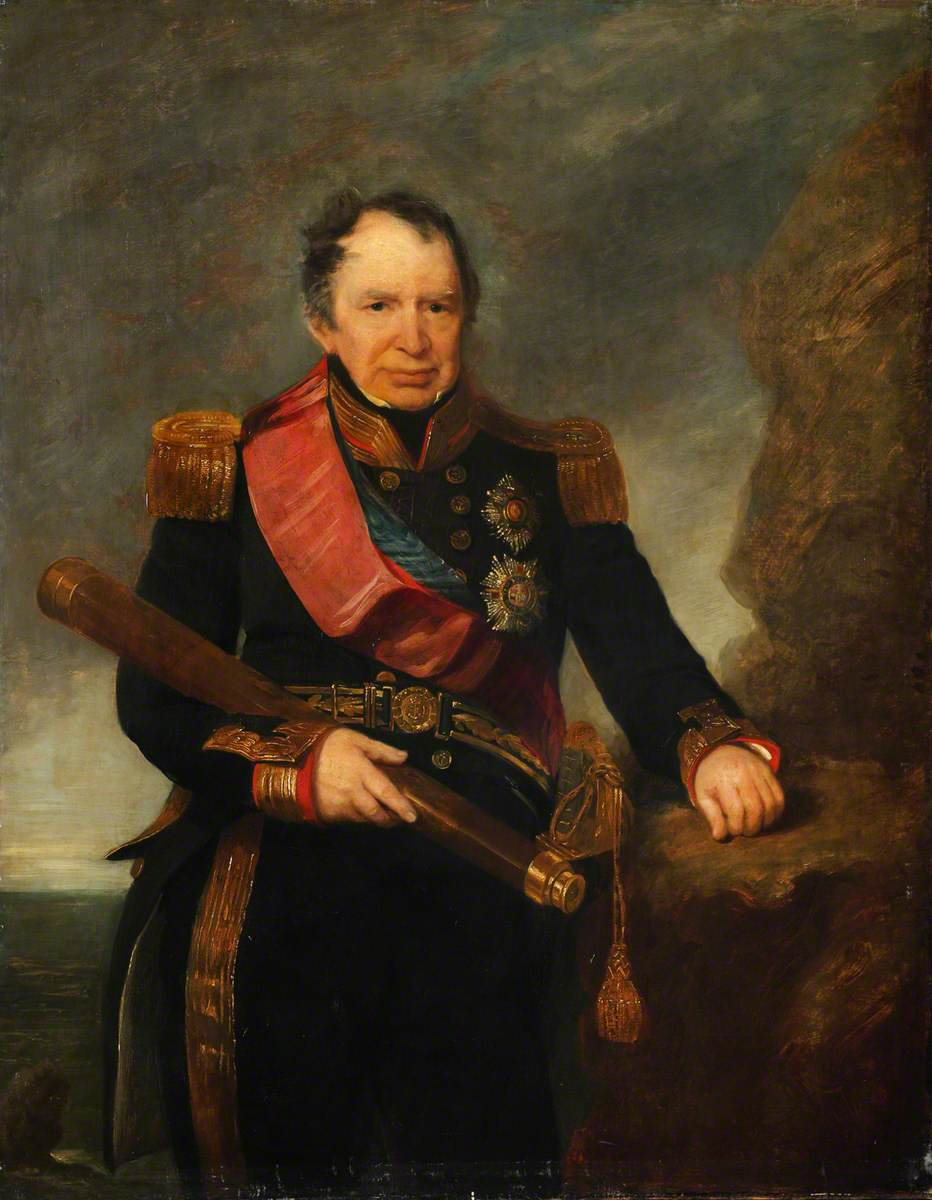
Josias Rowley, the commander of the invasion force's naval contingent

France's Indian Ocean colonies of Isle Bonaparte and Isle de France had provided a secure base for French privateers and French Navy frigates to operate against British shipping in the region for the entire French Revolutionary and Napoleonic Wars. In 1808, determined to capitalise on this poorly defended region of British trade, the French government ordered Commodore Jacques Hamelin in Vénus to sail to Isle de France where he would be joined by three other large and powerful frigates with specific orders to target British trade. Dispersing his frigates into the Bay of Bengal, Hamelin had some success during 1809: Caroline capturing two East Indiamen at the action of 31 May 1809 and Hamelin himself seizing three at the action of 18 November 1809. The French squadron also captured a number of smaller British warships and the large Portuguese frigate Minerve.

To counteract Hamelin's ships, the British commander in the region Admiral Albemarle Bertie had ordered Commodore Josias Rowley to operate off the islands with a squadron of Royal Navy frigates, with instructions to disrupt French movements and prepare for future invasion attempts. Rowley's ships had some successes: one of the East Indiamen captured by Hamelin was retaken by a blockading frigate in December 1809, but he was largely powerless to prevent the large French ships leaving their fortified anchorages at will. Rowley's first action to address this problem was to request a British Army force from the government in Madras. This force, made up of British soldiers and Honourable East India Company (HEIC) sepoys, was used to capture the tiny island of Rodriguez.

Rodriguez provided a secure harbour, at which Rowley's ships could collect supplies and repair minor damage within a short sailing distance of the French islands: previously the British ships had been forced to return to Madras or the Cape of Good Hope, decreasing the time available for operations against the islands. Rodriguez also provided Rowley with a staging post from which he could prepare the planned invasions and, in September 1809, he led an amphibious operation against the defences of the harbour of Saint Paul on Isle Bonaparte.

The Raid on Saint Paul was an important demonstration of Rowley's ability to strike at the French anchorages directly. Landing men at unwatched beaches, the British soldiers, sailors and Royal Marines of the landing party were able to storm the defences from the landward side and rout the defenders. This allowed Rowley's squadron to enter the harbour and capture Caroline and a number of smaller ships that were docked there. The attack caused consternation on the island and its commander, Nicolas Des Bruslys, committed suicide rather than order his troops to attack the British positions. Unopposed, Rowley was able to destroy the defences and public works in the town before leaving with large quantities of captured supplies and ships. Colonel Chrysostome Sainte-Suzanne replaced Des Bruslys but was unable to effectively defend the island with the remaining garrison in the event of a concerted invasion.

=== Preparation ===
In early 1810, as the cyclone season came to an end, Hamelin ordered a squadron of frigates under Captain Guy-Victor Duperré to attack British convoys in the Bay of Bengal. Duperré was initially unsuccessful, but after sailing to Madagascar for a brief refit he encountered and defeated a convoy in the action of 3 July 1810. The British response to the French depredations was already in progress: in late June, Rowley sailed with two frigates to Rodriguez, leaving Captain Samuel Pym off Isle de France with the remainder. On Rodriguez, Rowley and Lieutenant Colonel Henry Keating conferred on the best method of invading and rapidly subduing the island, determining that the best plan was to land soldiers either side of the island's capital Saint Denis and defeat the garrison outside the town, forcing the new governor to surrender.

The government in Madras had augmented the garrison of Rodriguez over the previous year, so that by June 1810 it stood at over 3,650 men: 1,800 British Army regulars and 1,850 HEIC Army sepoys under Keating's overall command. To transport these troops, Rowley called up his own frigate HMS Boadicea and HMS Nereide under Captain Nesbit Willoughby, a veteran of the raid on Saint Paul who was still recovering from an accidental explosion two months before that had inflicted severe facial injuries. Among the passengers on Boadicea was Robert Townsend Farquhar, a diplomat and trader with the HEIC who had been sent from London to assume governorship of the islands once they had been captured. On 6 July, Rowley's force rendezvoused with the squadron under Pym, consisting of his frigate HMS Sirius, HMS Iphigenia under Captain Henry Lambert and HMS Magicienne under Captain Lucius Curtis.

== Invasion ==
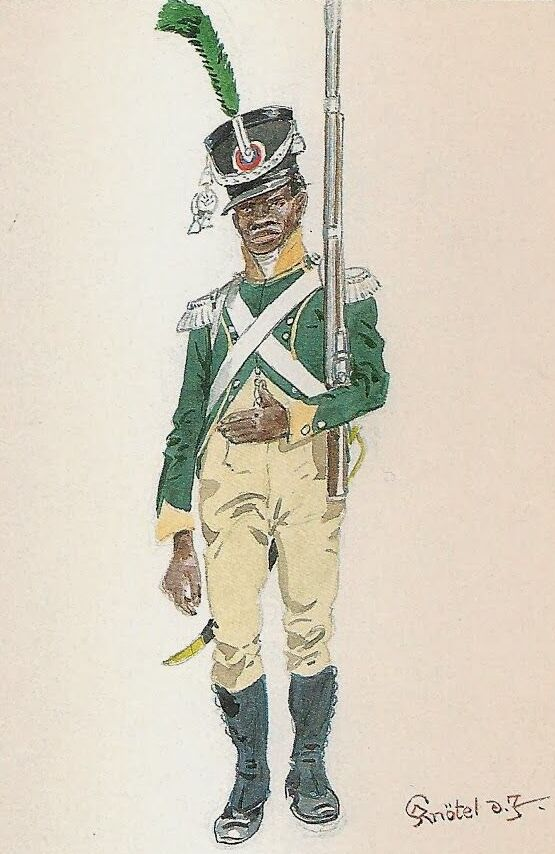
A private of the Chasseurs de la Reunion, which resisted the invasion

Rowley's squadron and a number of supporting transport ships reached Isle Bonaparte on 7 July. The main body, under Rowley, approached Sainte-Marie at 14:00, to draw French forces away from Grande Chaloupe, where Sirius was secretly landing the first "brigade" under Lieutenant Colonel Frazier. This force of 950 soldiers, a small battery of howitzers and the supplies needed for the campaign was landed without loss under the direction of Navy Lieutenant John Wyatt Watling, who had landed first and secured the beach with a party of seamen, distributing the soldiers and supplies as they came ashore. Advancing rapidly to seize the heights over the beach, Frazier drove off French outposts and snipers and cut the main road between Saint Denis and Saint Paul, hampering French communications and the movement of reinforcements.

To the east, on the other side of Saint Denis, Rowley ordered his forces to land. The first ashore was intended to be Nesbit Willoughby in a schooner named Estafette, to secure the beach and organise the landing forces. However, as this boat approached the beach the wind strengthened and built up a powerful surf, which smashed the schooner ashore with enough force to break it apart: four of the 150-strong landing party were drowned. (Note: Estafette was a French naval 4-gun schooner that Willoughby and Nereide's boats had captured in a raid on 1 May at Jacotet on the Isle de France.) Realising that the smaller transports would be similarly overwhelmed by the waves, Keating ordered a small brig named Ulney driven on shore as a breakwater. This allowed a number of additional boats safely to reach the beach but did not provide enough cover for a full landing before nightfall.

By the morning of 8 July, the French had still failed to concentrate their forces, which consisted of 576 regular French Army soldiers and 2,717 militia dispersed across the island. Seeing that a landing on the beach at Grande Chaloupe was still practical, Captains Rowley and Lambert successfully landed their contingents, providing Keating with sufficient force to march on Saint Denis. While Keating was landing, Frazier had advanced on the capital from the west, storming a French barricade on the road from Saint Paul and routing its defenders with minimal casualties. Brushing aside French resistance in a series of minor skirmishes, Keating and Frazier's forces closed on Saint Denis. The advancing British were met at 18:00 by representatives of Sainte-Suzanne, who later signed a capitulation that surrendered the entire island to Rowley, Keating and Farquhar with its garrison and supplies.

Offshore, Sirius had blockaded Saint Paul after landing her soldiers and, on 9 July, observed a ship attempting to break out of the harbour after hearing news of the surrender. Sirius sent her barge, under the command of Lieutenant George Norman, to pursue the fugitive. In an exhausting twelve-hour chase, Norman was able to catch and board the ship, revealed to be a privateer named Edward carrying four guns and 30 men. Norman was able to defeat the crew in a brief struggle in which three men were wounded, and discovered that she was carrying despatches from the French government for the authorities on Isle de France, all of which fell into British hands.

== Aftermath ==
The invasion cost the British a combined total of 22 dead and 79 wounded, including those drowned in the wreck of Estafette. Most of the other casualties had been incurred in the skirmishes on the road to Saint Denis and French casualties, although not known, were probably of a similar number. The French failed to put up a meaningful resistance to the British force, which rapidly established beachheads and carried French outposts without facing significant opposition. The island reverted to its pre-Revolutionary name of Bourbon following the invasion, and Farquhar briefly assumed the governorship before moving to Isle de France upon that island's capture in December 1810. Keating replaced him in command and remained in the position until 1814, when the island was restored to France at the end of the Napoleonic Wars.

The success allowed British forces to concentrate against the one remaining French colony in the Indian Ocean, Isle de France. Bourbon provided a number of secure anchorages and plentiful supplies for the British frigate squadron, becoming Rowley and Keating's new headquarters. With a safe harbour only a short journey away, Rowley was able to despatch his frigates against French ports on Isle de France more frequently and more aggressively, developing a plan to seize small offshore islands near the main harbours on Isle de France to disrupt the passage of shipping and the ability of French frigates to use these ports as raiding bases. This plan ultimately led to the disastrous attempt to seize the shipping in Grand Port in which four frigates of Rowley's squadron were lost.

== Monuments ==
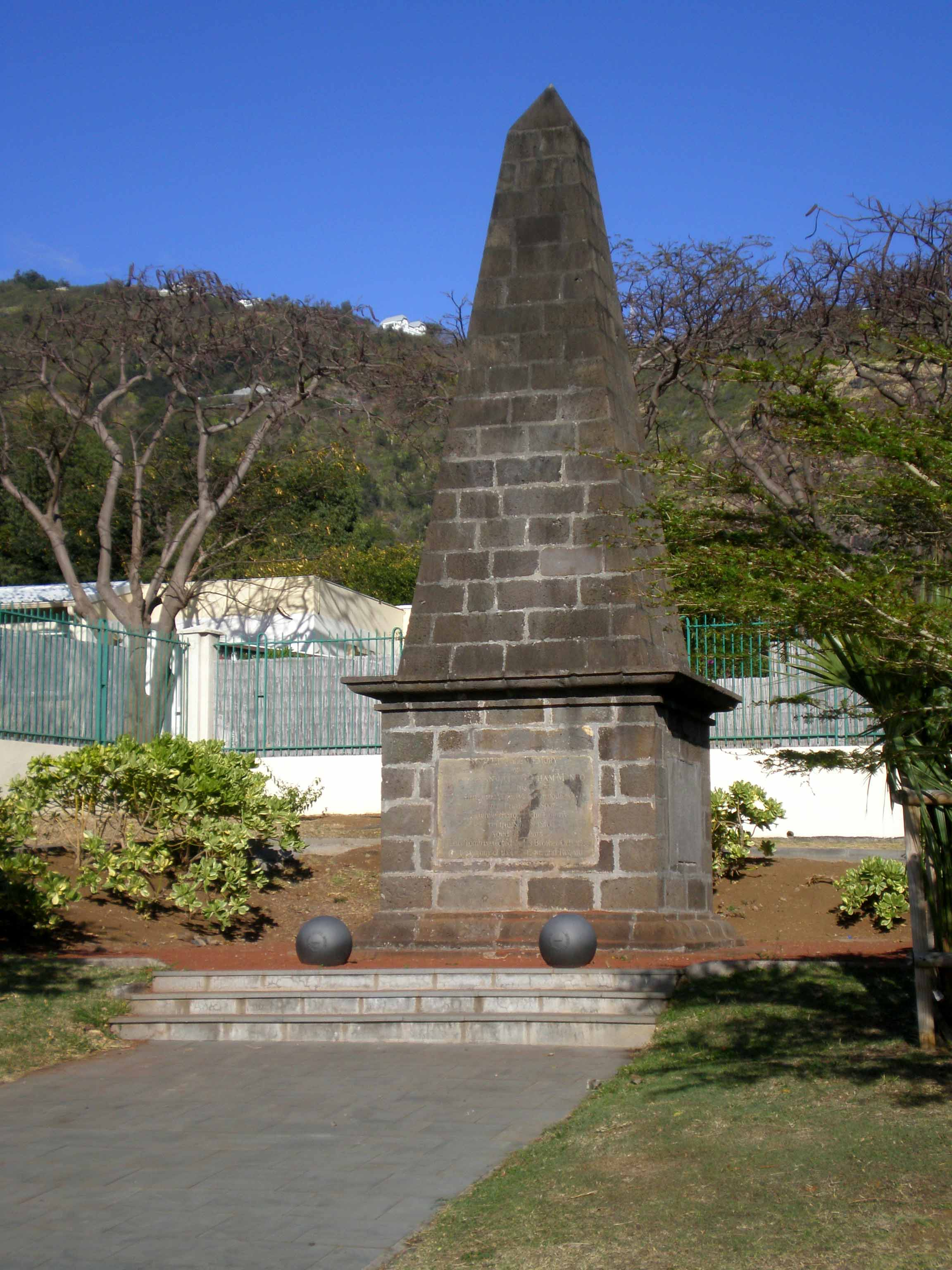
Commemorative obelisk honouring the British

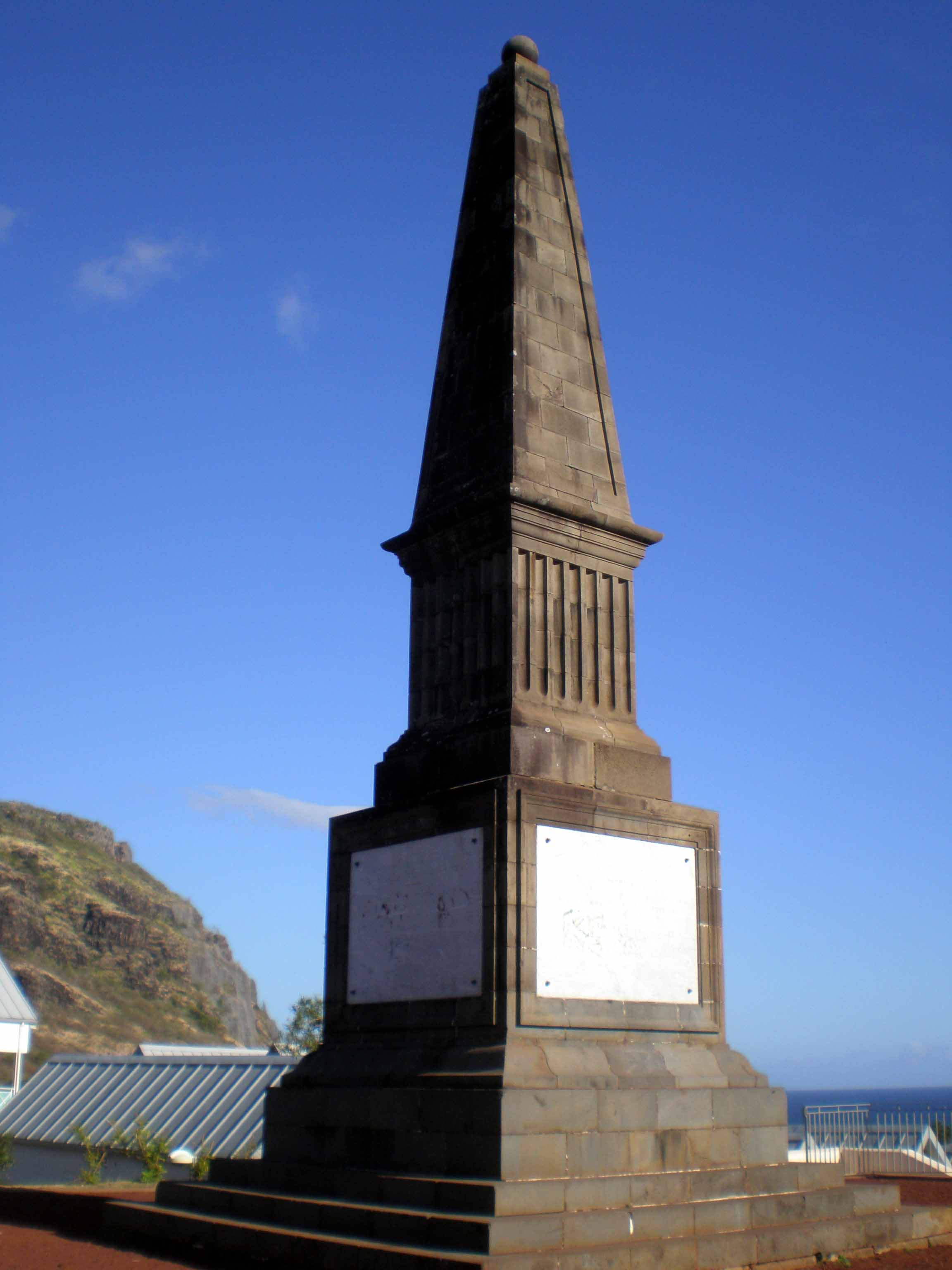
Commemorative obelisk honouring the French

== Bibliography ==
- Brenton, Edward Pelham (1825). The Naval History of Great Britain, Vol. IV. C. Rice. "edward pelham brenton."
- Clowes, William (2003) [1900]. The Royal Navy, A History from the Earliest Times to 1900, v.5. Chatham Publishing. ISBN 1-86176-014-0.
- Gardiner, Robert (2001) [1998]. The Victory of Seapower. Caxton Editions. ISBN 1-84067-359-1.
- James, William (2002) [1827]. The Naval History of Great Britain, Volume 5, 1808–1811. Conway Maritime Press. ISBN 0-85177-909-3.
- Woodman, Richard (2001). The Sea Warriors. Constable Publishers. ISBN 1-84119-183-3.
