= Windham (1808 ship) =

British ship

History

United Kingdom
- Name: Windham
- Launched: 1808, (Note: As she was already sailing in 1808, the report that she was launched in 1808 and of 800 tons (bm), see below, appears to be more accurate than the report that she was launched in 1809 and of 500 tons (bm).)
- Fate: Wrecked 20 September 1820

General characteristics
- Tons burthen: 500, or 800, or 833 (bm)

Windham was a country ship, i.e., a British vessel that, in compliance with the British East India Company's monopoly on the British trade between Britain and the Far East, traded only east of the Cape of Good Hope. She was built at Demaun in 1808.

The "Windham transport", of 833 tons (bm), participated in the British invasion of Java in August–September 1811. The East India Company provided the services of several of their ships, led by Malabar under Commodore John Hayes. These were Ariel, Aurora, Mornington, Nautilus, Psyche, Thetis, and Vestal. This is in addition to the transport vessels. The "Windham transport" carried the 3rd volunteer battalion to Cheribon.

An American letter of marque captured Windham off China later in 1814, but gave her up after taking part of her cargo.

On 20 September 1815 Windham, Nichols, master, sailing from Bengal to China, wrecked on Brunswick Rock. Her crew was saved.
