= Lady Jane Dundas (1800 EIC ship) =

History
- Name: Lady Jane Dundas
- Namesake: Lady Jane Dundas
- Owner: Sir Robert Wigram
- Builder: Executors of William Cleverley, Gravesend
- Launched: 13 March 1800
- Fate: Foundered 1809

General characteristics
- Type: Ship
- Tons burthen: 826, 875, or 87543/94 (bm)
- Length: Overall:146 ft 2 in (44.6 m); Keel:118 ft 3 in (36.0 m) (keel)
- Beam: 36 ft 3 in (11.0 m)
- Depth of hold: 14 ft 9 1/2 in (4.5 m)
- Propulsion: Sail
- Complement: 1800:102; 1804:101; 1808:100
- Armament: 1800:26 × 12&6-pounder guns; 1804:30 × 18-pounder guns; 1808:30 × 18-pounder guns
- Notes: Three decks

Lady Jane Dundas was launched in 1800 as an East Indiaman. She made four voyages for the British East India Company (EIC) and was lost in 1809 on the homeward-bound leg of her fifth voyage. She and three other Indiamen parted from the homeward-bound convoy during a gale on 18 March 1809 and were never seen again.

== Career ==
=== EIC voyage #1 (1800–1801) ===
Captain the Hon. Hugh Lindsay acquired a letter of marque on 10 April 1800. He sailed from Torbay on 27 May 1800, bound for Bengal. Lady Jane Dundas reached Acheh on 4 November and arrived at Kedgeree on 6 December. Homeward bound, she was at Saugor on 24 January 1801, reached St Helena on 21 May and Cork on 24 July, and arrived at The Downs on 11 August.

=== EIC voyage #2 (1802–1803) ===
Captain Lindsay sailed from Portsmouth on 27 February 1802, bound for Madras and Bengal. Lady Jane Dundas reached Madras on 25 June and arrived at Diamond Harbour on 13 July. Homeward bound, she was at Saugor on 22 October. She and Walthamstow left Bengal on 28 December and reached St Helena together. They reached St Helena on 3 March 1803, and arrived at The Downs on 5 May.

=== EIC voyage #3 (1804–1805) ===
War with France had resumed in 1803 and Captain Lindsay acquired a letter of marque on 26 January 1804. He sailed from Portsmouth on 20 March 1804, bound for Madras and Bengal in a convoy under the escort of HMS Lapwing The other East Indiamen in the convoy were Marchioness of Exeter, Canton, Princess Charlotte, Marquis of Ely, Marquis Wellesley, Lord Nelson, and Brunswick.

Lady Jane Dundas reached Madras on 18 July and arrived at Diamond Harbour on 13 August. She was at Kidderpore on 23 September. Homeward bound, she was at Saugor on 22 November and Madrasa again on 12 February 1805. She reached St Helena on 20 June, and arrived at The Downs on 10 September.

=== EIC voyage #4 (1806–1807) ===
Captain Lindsay sailed from Portsmouth on 4 March 1806, bound for Madras and Bengal. Lady Jane Dundas reached Madras on 28 June and arrived at Diamond Harbour on 10 July. She was at Saugor on 12 September, visited Penang on 18 October and returned to Bengal, arriving at Kedgeree on 13 December. Homeward bound, she was at Saugor on 30 January 1807, reached St Helena on 13 June, and arrived at The Downs on 6 September.

== Loss ==
Captain John Eckford acquired a letter of marque on 12 February 1808. He sailed from Portsmouth on 8 May 1808, bound for Madras and Bengal.

On 14 March 1809, Lady Jane Dundas, Calcutta, Bengal, and Jane, Duchess of Gordon parted company with the main convoy of homeward-bound East Indiamen off Mauritius in a gale. Hugh Inglis was the last vessel to see Jane, Duchess of Gordon and Lady Jane Dundas; Huddart was the last vessel to see Bengal and Calcutta. They were never heard of again. The hull of one of the four missing vessels was sighted overturned off Mauritius the following October, but sank before it could be identified.

The EIC valued the cargo it lost on Lady Jane Dundas at £36,808.
