= Bengal (1799 EIC ship) =

British East India Company ship lost in 1809

History

British East India Company
- Name: Bengal
- Owner: Gabriel Guillett (or Gillett)
- Builder: Perry, Wells & Green, Blackwall
- Launched: 13 November 1799
- Fate: Foundered 1809

General characteristics
- Type: Ship
- Tons burthen: 818, or 81988/94, or 868 (bm)
- Length: Overall:146 ft 0 in (44.5 m); Keel:118 ft 0 1/2 in (36.0 m)
- Beam: 36 ft 8 in (11.2 m)
- Depth of hold: 14 ft 9 in (4.5 m)
- Propulsion: Sail
- Complement: 1800:97; 1804:110; 1808:110
- Armament: 1800:20 × 18-pounder guns + 6 × 18-pounder carronades; 1804:32 × 18-pounder guns; 1808:32 × 18-pounder guns
- Notes: Three decks

Bengal was launched in 1799 as an East Indiaman for the British East India Company (EIC). She made four complete voyages but foundered in 1809 with no trace while homeward bound from the fifth.

== Career ==
=== EIC voyage #1 (1800–1801) ===
Captain Adam Cumine acquired a letter of marque on 6 February 1800. He sailed from Torbay on 27 May 1800, bound for Bengal. Bengal arrived at Kedgeree on 6 December. Homeward bound, she was at Saugor on 25 January 1801. She left Bengal on 25 February, and reached St Helena on 21 May. She left St Helena on 2 June, and reached Cork on 24 July; she arrived at Long Reach on 14 August.

=== EIC voyage #2 (1802–1803) ===
Captain Cumine sailed from The Downs on 14 March 1802, bound for Madras and Bengal. Bengal reached Madras on 24 June and arrived at Diamond Harbour on 4 July. Homeward bound she was at Saugor on 17 September, Madras on 7 October, and Colombo on 10 November. She reached St Helena on 27 January 1803, and left on 19 February together with some other Indiamen and under escort by HMS Romney. Bengal arrived at Gravesend on 24 April.

=== EIC voyage #3 (1804–1805) ===
Captain Adam Cumine acquired a new letter of marque on 27 February 1804. He sailed from Portsmouth on 8 May 1804, bound for Madras and Bengal. Bengal reached Madras on 3 September and arrived at Diamond Harbour on 26 September. Homeward bound she was at Saugor on 9 December. She reached St Helena on 29 June 1804and arrived at Long Reach on 14 September.

=== EIC voyage #4 (1806–1807) ===
Captain Cumine sailed from Portsmouth on 4 March 1806, bound for Madras and Bengal. Bengal reached Madras on 27 June and arrived at Diamond Harbour on 9 July. She then was at Saugor on 6 September, Penang on 17 October, and back at Kedgeree on 13 December. Homeward bound, she was at Saugor on 23 January 1807, Madras on 23 February, and Colombo on 19 March. She reached St Helena on 13 June and arrived at Long Reach on 10 September.

=== EIC voyage #5 (1808–Loss) ===
Captain Richard Harper Sharpe acquired a letter of marque on 24 February 1808. He had been Chief Mate on her previous voyage. He sailed from Portsmouth on 8 May 1808, bound for Ceylon and Bengal.

On 14 March 1809, Bengal, Calcutta, Jane, Duchess of Gordon, and Lady Jane Dundas parted company with the main convoy of homeward-bound East Indiamen off Mauritius in a gale. They were never heard of again. The hull of one of them was sighted overturned off Mauritius the following October, but sank before it could be identified.

The EIC valued the cargo it lost on Bengal at £121,162.
