= Jane, Duchess of Gordon (1805 EIC ship) =

History
- Name: Jane, Duchess of Gordon
- Namesake: Jane Gordon, Duchess of Gordon
- Owner: Charles Christie
- Builder: Dudman, Deptford
- Launched: 14 April 1805
- Fate: Foundered 1809

General characteristics
- Type: Ship
- Tons burthen: 820, or 822, or 82258/94, or 868 (bm)
- Length: Overall: 143 ft 10 in (43.8 m); Keel: 116 ft 1 in (35.4 m) (keel)
- Beam: 36 ft 6 in (11.1 m)
- Depth of hold: 14 ft 10 in (4.5 m)
- Propulsion: Sail
- Complement: 110
- Armament: 2 × 18-pounder guns + 28 × 18-pounder carronades
- Notes: Three decks

Jane, Duchess of Gordon was launched in 1805 as an East Indiaman for the British East India Company (EIC). She made one complete voyage for the EIC and then foundered while homeward bound on the second.

== History ==
=== First voyage (1805–1807) ===
Captain John Cameron acquired a letter of marque on 18 March 1805. He sailed from Portsmouth on 10 August 1805, bound for Madras and Bengal. Jane, Duchess of Gordon was at Cork on 14 August, Madeira on 29 September, and St. Salvadore on 10 November.

Jane, Duchess of Gordon was one of the EIC vessels that were part of the expedition under General Sir David Baird and Admiral Sir Home Riggs Popham that would in 1806 capture the Dutch Cape Colony. They would carry supplies and troops to the Cape, and then continue on their voyages.

Jane, Duchess of Gordon arrived at the Cape of Good Hope on 4 January 1806.

After Dutch Governor Jansens signed a capitulation on 18 January 1806, and the British established control of the Cape Colony, Belliqueux escorted William Pitt, Jane, Duchess of Gordon, Sir William Pulteney, and Comet to Madras. The convoy included Northampton, Streatham, Europe, Union, Glory, and Sarah Christiana.

Jane, Duchess of Gordon reached Madras on 17 April.

At Madras, the captains of the eight East Indiamen in the convoy joined together to present Captain George Byng, of Belliqueux, a piece of silver plate worth £100 as a token of appreciation for his conduct while they were under his orders. Byng wrote his thank you letter to them on 24 April.

Jane, Duchess of Gordon arrived at Diamond Harbour on 21 June. Homeward bound, she was at Saugor on 4 September, Madras on 9 October, and the Cape on 30 December. She reached St Helena on 23 January 1807 and arrived at The Downs on 12 April.

=== Second voyage (1808–09 and loss) ===
Captain Cameron sailed from Portsmouth on 8 May 1808, bound for Ceylon and Bengal. Leopard provided the escort for the convoy of East Indiamen. Leopard left the convoy on 28 July at 35°S 7°E.

On 14 March 1809 Jane, Duchess of Gordon, Calcutta, Bengal, and Lady Jane Dundas parted company with the main convoy of East Indiamen off Mauritius in a gale. They were never heard of again. The hull of one of them was sighted overturned off Mauritius the following October, but sank before it could be identified.

The EIC valued the cargo it lost on Jane, Duchess of Gordon at £86,089.
