= Calcutta (1798 EIC ship) =

History

Great Britain
- Name: Calcutta
- Namesake: Calcutta
- Owner: EIC voyages 1-2:Robert Charnock; EIC voyages 3-5:Henry Bonham
- Operator: British East India Company
- Builder: Wells, Deptford
- Launched: 31 March 1798
- Fate: Foundered 1809

General characteristics
- Type: East Indiaman
- Tons burthen: 819, 81952/94, or 850 (bm)
- Length: 146 ft 2 1/4 in (44.6 m) (overall); 118 ft 9 in (36.2 m) (keel)
- Beam: 36 ft 2 1/4 in (11.0 m)
- Depth of hold: 14 ft 9 1/4 in (4.5 m)
- Propulsion: Sail
- Complement: 1797:100; 1803:99; 1805:125
- Armament: 1797:20 × 12-pounder guns + 8 × 18-pounder carronades; 1803:20 × 12-pounder guns + 8 × 18-pounder carronades; 1805:8 × 18-pounder guns
- Notes: Three decks

Calcutta was launched in 1798 as an East Indiaman. She made four voyages for the British East India Company (EIC), and disappeared while homeward bound from Bengal on her fifth voyage.

On 5 April 1797 the EIC accepted a tender by Michael Humble for Calcutta. The terms were that the EIC would engage her for six voyages to ports in India or China at a rate of £20 10s per ton for 819 tons. The EIC required that Calcutta be built on the Thames.

== EIC voyage #1 (1798–1800) ==
Captain William Maxwell acquired a letter of marque on 1 May 1798. He sailed from Portsmouth on 8 June 1798, bound for St Helena, Bengal, Bombay, and Madras. Calcutta reached St Helena on 19 August and arrived at Diamond Harbour on 21 December. She was at Saugor on 28 January 1799, Cannanore on 7 March, Bombay on 26 April, and Madras on 4 July. She returned to Diamond Harbour on 18 August. Homeward bound, she was at Saugor on 23 September and Madras again on 21 October and the Cape of Good Hope on 31 December. She reached St Helena on 27 January 1800 and arrived at Long Reach on 2 June.

== EIC voyage #2 (1801–1802) ==
Captain Maxwell sailed from Portsmouth on 31 March 1801, bound for Madras and Bengal. Calcutta reached Madras on 26 July and arrived at Diamond Harbour on 20 August. Homeward bound, she was at Saugor on 13 January 1802 and Madras on 7 February. She reached St Helena on 14 May and arrived at Long Reach on 19 July.

== EIC voyage #3 (1803–1804) ==
Captain Maxwell sailed from Portsmouth on 12 April 1803, bound for Madras and Bengal. The Peace of Amiens had failed and war with France had resumed. Maxwell received a letter of marque on 2 July.

Calcutta reached Madras on 4 August and Vizagapatam on 22 August before she arrived at Diamond Harbour on 29 August. She was at Kedgeree on 24 September and Saugor on 14 October, before returning Kedgeree on 24 December. Homeward bound, she was at Saugor on 22 January 1804, reached St Helena on 28 June, and arrived at Long Reach on 16 October.

== EIC voyage #4 (1805–1807) ==
Captain John Reddie acquired a letter of marque on 9 February 1805. He sailed from Portsmouth on 8 March 1805, bound for St Helena, Bengal and Madras. Calcutta reached St Helena on 5 June and arrived at Diamond Harbour on 27 September. She was at Saugor on 29 October and Bencoolen on 22 December before she returned to Diamond Harbour on 13 May 1806 and Calcutta on 18 June.

As Calcutta was leaving Bengal in July, she grounded. It was expected that she would have to return to the dock to repair.

Homeward bound, she was at Saugor on 30 August, Madras on 7 October, Trincomalee on 18 October, and the Cape on 30 December. She reached St Helena on 23 January 1807 and arrived at Long Reach on 15 April.

== EIC voyage #5 (1808) ==
Captain William Maxwell sailed from Portsmouth on 5 March 1808, bound for Madras and Bengal.

== Fate ==
On 14 March 1809 Calcutta, Bengal, Jane, Duchess of Gordon, and Lady Jane Dundas, parted company with the main homeward bound convoy of East Indiamen off Mauritius in a gale. Lloyd's List reported on 26 September 1809 that they had not been heard of since parting from the fleet.

The four ships were never heard of again. The hull of one of them was sighted overturned off Mauritius the following October, but sank before it could be identified. The EIC valued the cargo that it lost on Calcutta at £124,452.
