= HMS Culloden (1783) =

Ship of the line of the Royal Navy

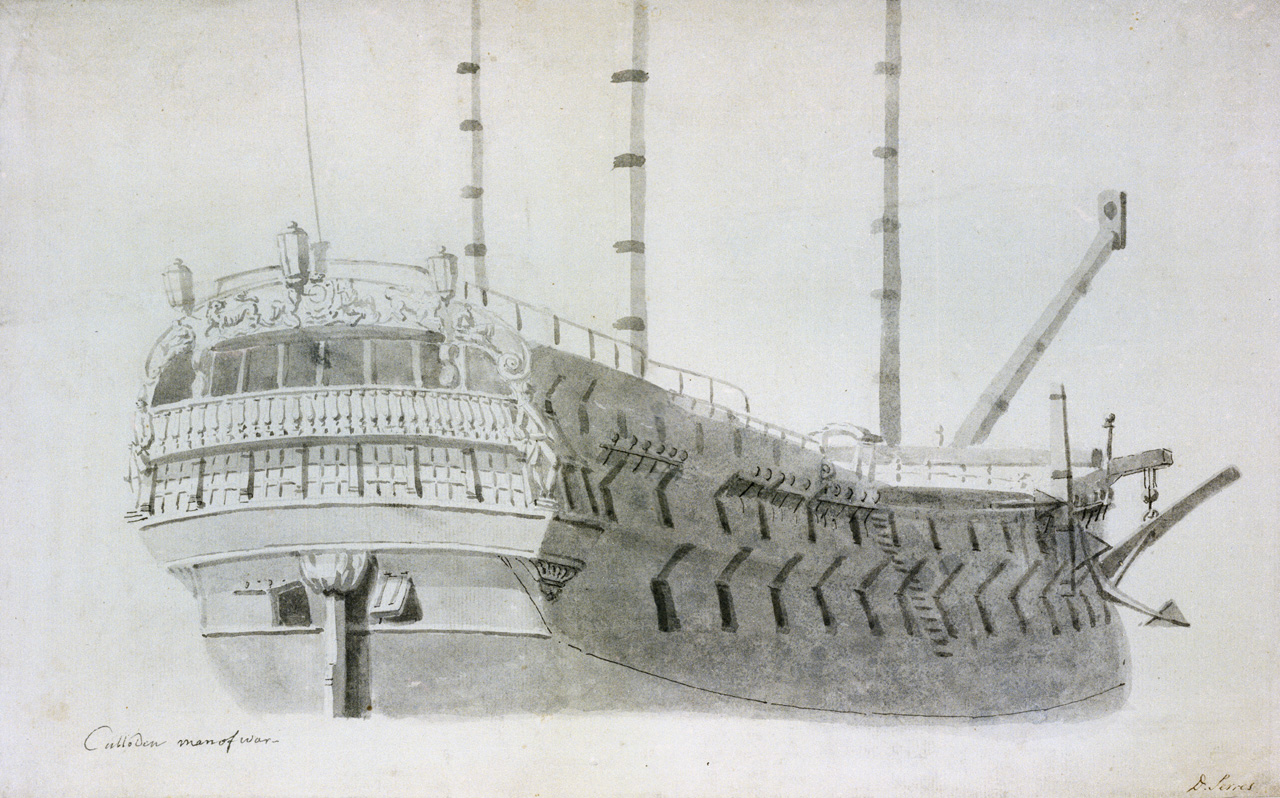
- c. 1785 illustration of Culloden by Dominic Serres

History

Great Britain
- Name: HMS Culloden
- Ordered: 12 July 1779
- Builder: Randall, Rotherhithe
- Laid down: January 1782
- Launched: 16 June 1783
- Honours and awards: Participated in: Glorious First of June; Battle of Cape St Vincent; Battle of Santa Cruz de Tenerife; Battle of the Nile
- Fate: Broken up, February 1813

General characteristics
- Class & type: Ganges-class ship of the line
- Tons burthen: 1683 (bm)
- Length: 169 ft 6 in (51.7 m) (gundeck)
- Beam: 47 ft 8 1/2 in (14.5 m)
- Depth of hold: 20 ft 3 in (6.2 m)
- Propulsion: Sails
- Sail plan: Full-rigged ship
- Armament: Gundeck: 28 × 32-pounder guns; Upper gundeck: 28 × 18-pounder guns; QD: 14 × 9-pounder guns; Fc: 4 × 9-pounder guns

HMS Culloden was a 74-gun third rate ship of the line of the Royal Navy, launched on 16 June 1783 at Rotherhithe. She took part in some of the most famous battles of the French Revolutionary Wars and the Napoleonic Wars before she was broken up in 1813.

== French Revolutionary Wars ==
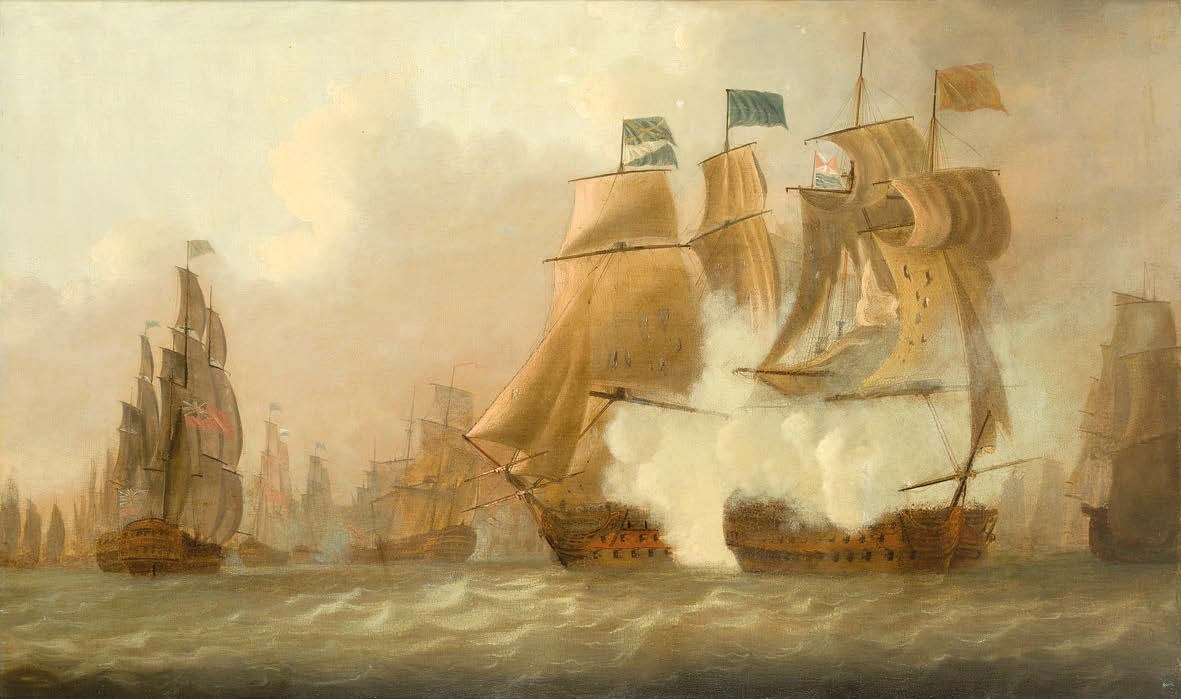
Painting of Culloden at the Battle of Cape St. Vincent attributed to William Elliot

One of her first engagements was the Glorious First of June, where she was commanded by Captain Isaac Schomberg. She was captained by Sir Thomas Troubridge at the 1797 Battle of Cape St. Vincent, in which he led the British line of battle; Culloden suffered 10 men killed and 47 wounded. Culloden later took part in the Battle of Santa Cruz de Tenerife in the same year. She participated in the Battle of the Nile in 1798, but ran aground on shoals before being able to engage the French fleet. She managed to refloat herself due to assistance from HMS Mutine.

== Napoleonic Wars ==
Culloden, Captain Christopher Cole, captured the French privateer Émilien on 26 September 1806 after a chase that lasted two days and a night. He described her as a ship corvette of 18 guns and 150 men. When the British took possession of Emilien at 2a.m. on the 25th, close off the shoals of Point Guadaveri they found out that they had driven her ashore the night before. She had had to jettison 12 guns, her anchors, and her boats, to enable her to be refloated. (Note: Between 1793 and 1816, the French colony of Yanam, which sits on the Godavari River, was under British control.) Cole noted that Émilien was "formerly His Majesty's Sloop Trincomalee". He further noted that she was copper fastened, and that under the name of Gloire had "annoyed our Trade". However, on this cruise she was two months out of Île de France without having made any captures. Lloyd's List reported that Culloden had captured a large French privateer named Ameleon in the Indian Sea and taken her into Madras. The Royal Navy took Émilien into service as HMS Emilien, but sold her in 1808 and it is not clear that she ever saw active service.

On 5 July 1808 Culloden captured the French privateer Union off Ceylon. Union had been at sea for 27 days, having sailed from Mauritius, when she encountered Culloden, but had not captured anything. Union was armed with eight guns and had a crew of 60 Europeans and 20 lascars.

== Fate ==
Culloden was finally broken up in February 1813.
