= Transport vessels for the cancelled British invasion of Isle de France =

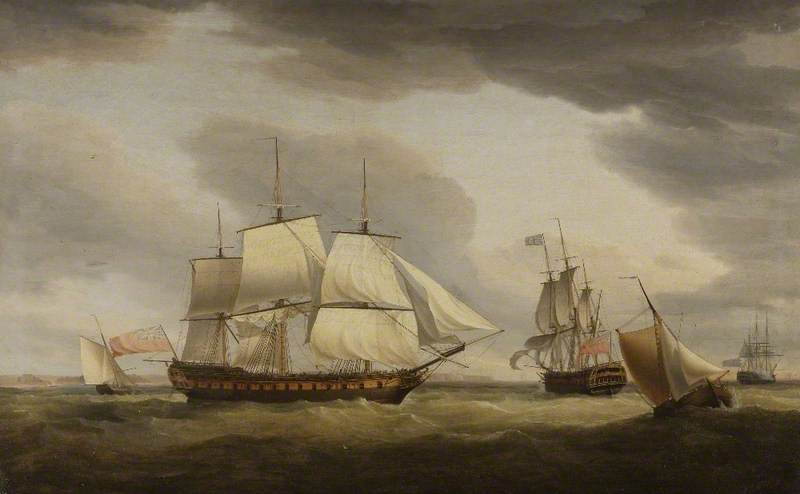
Taunton Castle, one of the ships British authorities planned to use for the invasion

In early 1794, after France declared war on Great Britain during the War of the First Coalition, the British government made plans for an invasion of the French colony of Isle de France. As part of preparations for the invasion, British authorities detained several of the East India Company's (EIC) East Indiamen at Portsmouth to serve as transport vessels. In May 1794, the British government cancelled the invasion and released the detained ships, paying demurrage to the EIC for having delayed their voyages to the East Indies. British forces carried out a successful invasion of Isle de France in 1810, using transport vessels which were mostly hired "country ships", British merchantmen registered in Indian ports such as Bombay and Calcutta, along with small number of EIC vessels that had arrived at Madras or Calcutta.

Vessel	Demurrage (Days)	Demurrage (£sd)
Airly Castle	72	£1,500
Albion	71	£1,479 3s 4d
Alfred	9	£241 17s 6d
Asia	72	£1,500
Boddam	71	£1,479 3s 4d
Bridgewater	71	£1,479 3s 4d
Busbridge	72	£1,365 12s
Carnatic	129	£3,440
Contractor	1	£18 19s 4d
Dublin	72	£1,500
Duke of Montrose	62	£1,291 13s 4d
Dutton	129	£2,687 10s
Earl of Wycombe	62	£1,087 1s 4d
Essex	72	£1,500
Europa	42	£875
Ganges	22	£458 6s 8d
General Eliott	71	£1,346 12s 8d
General Goddard	71	£1,479 3s 4d
King George	22	£458 6s 8d
Lord Camden	129 days	£2,687 10s
Lord Hawkesbury	123	£2,562 10s
Lord Macartney	62	£1,291 13s 4d
Manship	123	£2,562 10s
Melville Castle	123	£2,562 10s
Middlesex	22	£458 6s 8d
Nottingham	22	£586 13s 4d
Ocean	22	£586 13s 4d
Phoenix	72	£1,500 9d
Ponsborne	39	£812 10s
Queen	71	£1,479 3s 4d
Raymond	22	£456 6s 8d
Rockingham	129	£2,687 10s
Rose	22	£456 6s 8d
Sulivan	22	£456 6s 8d
Taunton Castle	17	£456 17s 6d
True Briton	71	£1,908 2s 6d
Valentine	22	£417 5s 4d
Woodford	62	£1,666 5s
