= Ceres (1797 EIC ship) =

1797 ship owned by the British East India Company

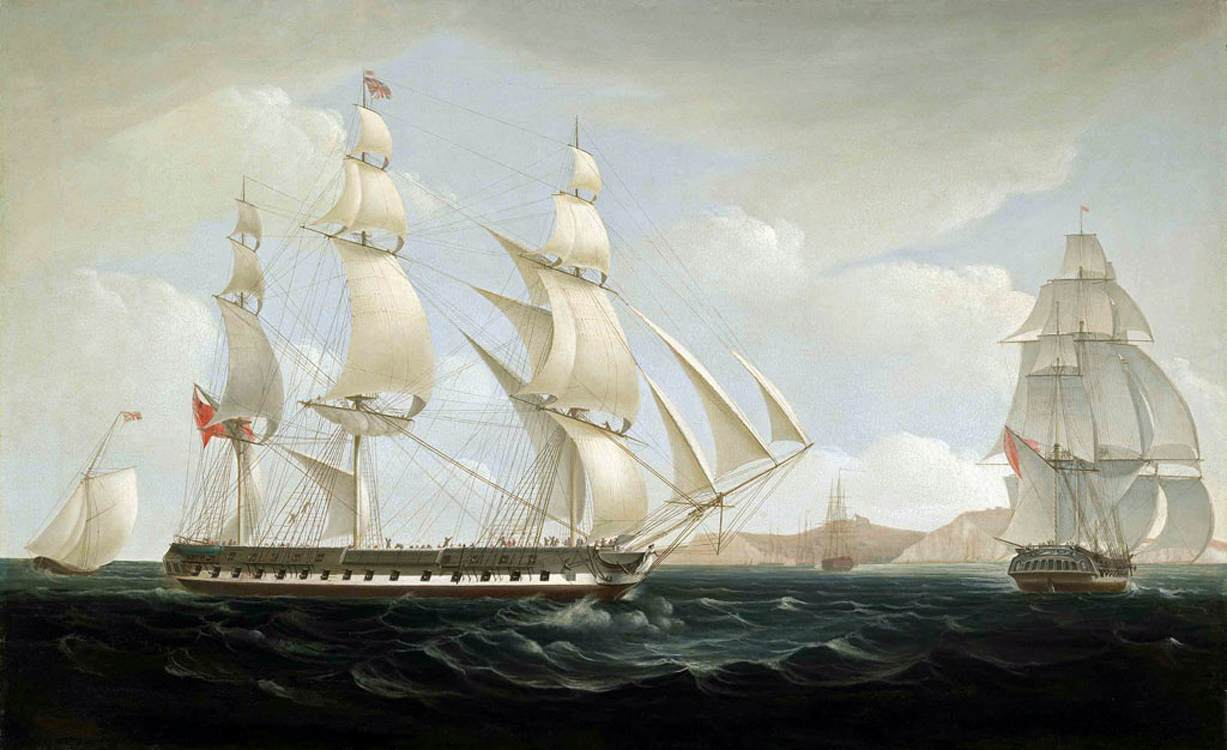
- Painting of Ceres in two positions off Saint Helena by William John Huggins

History

Great Britain
- Name: Lascelles
- Owner: EIC voyages 1-5:Thomas Newte; EIC voyage 6–9:George Stevens
- Operator: British East India Company
- Builder: Perry, Blackwall
- Launched: 28 January 1797
- Fate: Sold 1816 for hulking

General characteristics
- Tons burthen: 1430, 143091/94, or 1475 (bm)
- Length: 176 ft 7 in (53.8 m) (overall); 143 ft 11 1/2 in (43.9 m) (keel)
- Beam: 43 ft 2 3/4 in (13.2 m)
- Depth of hold: 17 ft 5 1/2 in (5.3 m)
- Propulsion: Sail
- Complement: 1804:130; 1811:130
- Armament: 1804: 36 × 18&12-pounder gun; 1811: 36 × 18&12-pounder guns
- Notes: Three decks

Ceres was launched in 1797 as an East Indiaman. She made nine voyages for the British East India Company (EIC), before she was hulked in 1816.

== Career ==
EIC voyage #1 (1797–1798): Captain George Stevens sailed from Portsmouth on 6 April 1797, bound for Madras and China. Ceres reached Madras on 27 July. The British government briefly hired her to use her as transport for an attack on Manila. A peace treaty with Spain forestalled the attack and the government released Ceres after she had spent some 59 days waiting, for which it paid £1598 in demurrage.

Ceres reached Penang on 6 September, and Malacca 15 October. She arrived at Whampoa anchorage on 22 December.

Homeward bound, Ceres crossed the Second Bar on 28 February 1798, reached St Helena on 5 August, and arrived at Long Reach on 22 October.

EIC voyage #2 (1800–1801): Captain Stevens sailed from Portsmouth on 17 March 1800, bound for Madras and China. Ceres reached Madras on 13 July and Penang on 27 August, and arrived at Whampoa on 30 October. Homeward bound, Ceres crossed the Second Bar on 14 December, reached St Helena on 15 April 1801, and arrived at Long Reach on 17 June.

EIC voyage #3 (1802–1803): Captain William Dunsford sailed from The Downs on 4 March 1802, bound for China. Ceres arrived at Whampoa on 30 July. Homeward bound, she crossed the Second Bar on 23 October, reached St Helena on 15 February 1803, and arrived at Long Reach on 26 April.

EIC voyage #4 (1804–1805): Captain Dunsford acquired a letter of marque on 7 April 1804. He sailed from Portsmouth on 9 June 1804. Ceres was part of a convoy of nine Indiamen, all bound for China: Alnwick Castle, Arniston, Cuffnells, Neptune, Perseverance, Royal Charlotte, Taunton Castle, and True Briton. HMS Athenienne provided the escort.

The fleet arrived at Rio de Janeiro around 14–18 August; Ceres arrived on 17 August. The fleet left Rio on 1 September and later passed the Cape of Good Hope. To avoid French ships reported to be in the Indian Ocean, the fleet sailed towards Western Australia, rather than to the Straits of Malacca.

The fleet sailed to Norfolk Island via Bass Strait; (Note: The fleet also had the objective to improve the charting of Bass Strait.) Norfolk Island was the next rendezvous point after Saint Paul Island, for members that had separated.

Ceres arrived at Whampoa on 13 January 1805. Homeward bound, she crossed the Second Bar on 14 February, reached Malacca on 21 March and St Helena on 30 June, and arrived at Long Reach on 15 September.

EIC voyage #5 (1806–1807): Captain Dunsford sailed from Portsmouth on 4 March 1806, bound for Bombay and China. Ceres reached Bombay on 20 June, Penang on 4 September, and Whampoa on 3 December. Homeward bound, she crossed the Second Bar on 13 December, reached Penang on 20 January 1807 and St Helena on 17 April, and arrived at Long Reach on 5 July.

EIC voyage #6 (1808–1809): Captain Dunsford sailed from Portsmouth on 5 March 1808, bound for Madras and China. Ceres reached the Cape of Good Hope on 31 May, Madras on 3 August, Penang on 21 August, Malacca on 5 September, and Whampoa on 4 October. Homeward bound, she crossed the Second Bar on 2 February 1809, reached Lintin on 2 March, Malacca on 22 March, Penang on 31 March and St Helena on 7 July. She arrived at Greenhithe on 14 September.

EIC voyage #7 (1811–1812): Captain Hugh Scott acquired a letter of marque on 25 February 1811. He sailed from Portsmouth on 8 April 1811, bound for China. Ceres reached the Cape on 13 July and Penang on 30 August; she arrived at Whampoa on 22 October. Homeward bound, she crossed the Second Bar on 18 December, reached St Helena on 21 March 1812, and arrived at Long Reach on 15 May.

EIC voyage #8 (1812–1814): Captain Scott sailed from Portsmouth on 24 December 1812, bound for China via St Helena and Bencoolen. Ceres stopped at St Helena, Bencoolen, Penang, Malacca, Whampoa, and St Helena, and arrived back at Long Reach on 10 August 1804.

EIC voyage #9 (1815–1816): Captain Scott sailed from The Downs on 3 April 1815, bound for St Helena and China. Ceres reached St Helena on 28 May, Penang on 22 August, Malacca on 9 September, and Whampoa on 13 October. Homeward bound, she crossed the Second Bar on 30 November, reached St Helena on 25 March 1812, and arrived at Long Reach on 14 May.

When Ceres arrived back at London she discharged her crew, including her Chinese sailors hired in Canton. Princess Amelia repatriated 29 to Canton, together with 351 others, leaving the Downs on 20 July 1816.

== Fate ==
In 1816 her owners sold Ceres for use as a hulk.
