= Neptune (1796 EIC ship) =

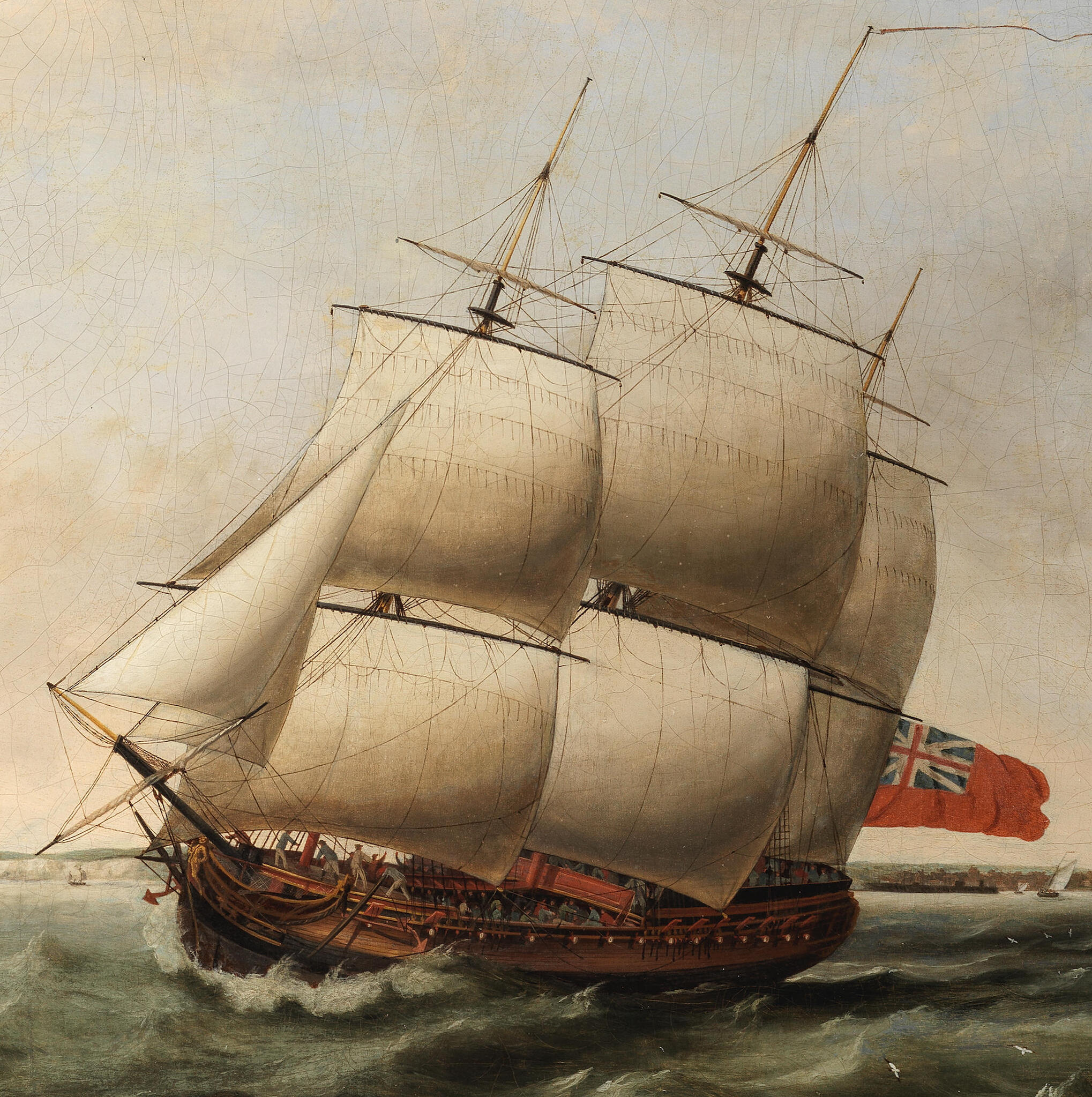
- 1817 painting of Neptune by Thomas Luny

History

Great Britain
- Name: Neptune
- Namesake: Neptune
- Owner: EIC voyages #1–6:Sir William Fraser, Bt.; EIC voyages 7 & 8:Sir Robert Wigram
- Builder: Wells, Deptford
- Launched: 30 November 1796
- Fate: Broken up 1819

General characteristics
- Tons burthen: 1468, 146865/94, or 1478 (bm)
- Length: Overall:176 ft 0 in (53.6 m); Keel:143 ft 8 1/2 in (43.8 m)
- Beam: 43 ft 10 in (13.4 m)
- Depth of hold: 17 ft 6 in (5.3 m)
- Sail plan: Full-rigged ship
- Complement: 1797:120; 1803:140; 1804:140
- Armament: 1797:32 × 12&6-pounder guns; 1803:32 × 12&6-pounder guns; 1804:26 × 12-pounder guns + 12 × 18-pounder carronades
- Notes: Three decks

Neptune was launched in 1796 as an East Indiaman. She made eight voyages for the British East India Company (EIC) before she was broken up in 1819. On her second voyage, in 1800, she was present at a notable action.

== Career ==
=== EIC voyage #1 (1797–1798) ===
Captain Nathaniel Spens acquired a letter of marque on 7 February 1797. He sailed from Portsmouth on 18 March 1797, bound for Bombay and China. Neptune reached Bombay on 7 July. Sailing for China she was at Cochin on 19 October, Anjengo on 24 October, and Malacca on 17 November. She arrived at Whampoa anchorage on 8 January 1798. Homeward bound, she crossed the Second Bar on 3 March, reached St Helena on 6 August, and arrived at The Downs on 17 October.

=== EIC voyage #2 (1800–1801) ===
Captain Spens sailed from Torbay on 27 May 1800, bound for China.

Neptune was part of a convoy that also included Dorsetshire, Exeter, Bombay Castle, and Coutts, the Botany Bay ships Royal Admiral and Anne, and the whaler Seringapatam. Their escort was the small ship of the line HMS Belliqueux.

On the morning of 4 August they encountered French squadron consisting of the frigates Concorde, Médée, and Franchise. The French commander was concerned that he had encountered a fleet of powerful warships so he turned to escape. The British commander, Captain Rowley Bulteel, immediately ordered a pursuit. To preserve the impression of warships he also ordered four of his most powerful East Indiamen to join the chase. First Belliqueux captured Concorde. Exeter and Bombay Castle set out after Médée and succeeded in coming up with her after dark and tricking her into surrendering to what Médée thought was a ship of the line.

Neptune reached Rio de Janeiro on 13 August and arrived at Whampoa on 19 February 1801. Homeward bound, she was at 9 May Lintin Island on 9 May, reached St Helena on 22 September, and arrived at The Downs on 10 December.

=== EIC voyage #3 (1802–1803) ===
Captain John Reddie sailed from The Downs on 30 April 1802, bound for China. Neptune arrived at Whampoa on 27 September. Homeward bound, she crossed the Second Bar on 9 January 1803, reached St Helena on 14 May, and arrived at The Downs on 18 July.

After Captain Reddie returned from this voyage he was one of the many captains that at the behest of the Astronomer Royal, Nevil Maskelyne, wrote a testimonial endorsing a reward to Thomas Earnshaw for his chronometer.

=== EIC voyage #4 (1804–1805) ===
Captain William Donaldson acquired a letter of marque on 23 February 1804. He sailed from Portsmouth on 9 June 1804. Neptune was part of a convoy of nine Indiamen, all bound for China: Alnwick Castle, Arniston, Ceres, Cuffnells, Perseverance, Royal Charlotte, Taunton Castle, and True Briton. HMS Athenienne provided the escort.

The fleet arrived at Rio de Janeiro around 14–18 August; Neptune arrived on 17 August. The fleet left Rio on 1 September and later passed the Cape of Good Hope. To avoid French ships reported to be in the Indian Ocean, the fleet sailed towards Western Australia, rather than to the Straits of Malacca.

The fleet sailed to Norfolk Island via Bass Strait; (Note: The fleet also had the objective to improve the charting of Bass Strait.) Norfolk Island was the next rendezvous point after Saint Paul Island, for members that had separated.

Neptune arrived at Whampoa on 13 January 1805. Homeward bound, she was at Malacca on 21 March, reached St Helena on 30 June, and arrived at The Downs on 10 September.

=== EIC voyage #5 (1806–1808) ===
Captain Thomas Buchanan sailed from Portsmouth on 14 May 1806, bound for China. Neptune was at the Cape of Good Hope on 7 August and Penang on 14 October, and arrived at Whampoa on 18 January 1807.

Homeward bound, she crossed the Second Bar on 23 February. However, while Neptune was at Canton in March, a major incident occurred. Thirty or forty seamen from Neptune scuffled with a number of Chinese and overmatching the Chinese, drove them away. The next day two to three thousand Chinese appeared opposite to the factory where Captain Buchanan was staying. They started throwing stones and brickbats, and attempted to force the closed gate. They returned on the third day, when the seamen sallied forth with walking sticks. The sailors succeeded in dispersing the crowd, but one of the Chinese, on returning home, suddenly died. The Chinese government demanded that the British deliver up the seaman who had struck the blow that proved fatal. The British replied that it was impossible to determine who that man was, and that it would be unjust to pick one seaman at random. The Chinese government was adamant and forbade the entire fleet of Indiamen from leaving. A local Chinese merchant who was acting as security merchant for Neptune was forced to sign an agreement that imperiled his life and fortune if he did not produce the guilty seaman in 10 days.

A seaman was given up as hostage and both Neptune and the other Indiamen eventually sailed. It was expected that the Chinese court would order the man expelled back to his home country.

Neptune was at Penang again on 3 July and the Cape on 19 September. She reached St Helena on 13 October and Crookhaven on 17 December, before arriving at the Downs on 17 February 1808.

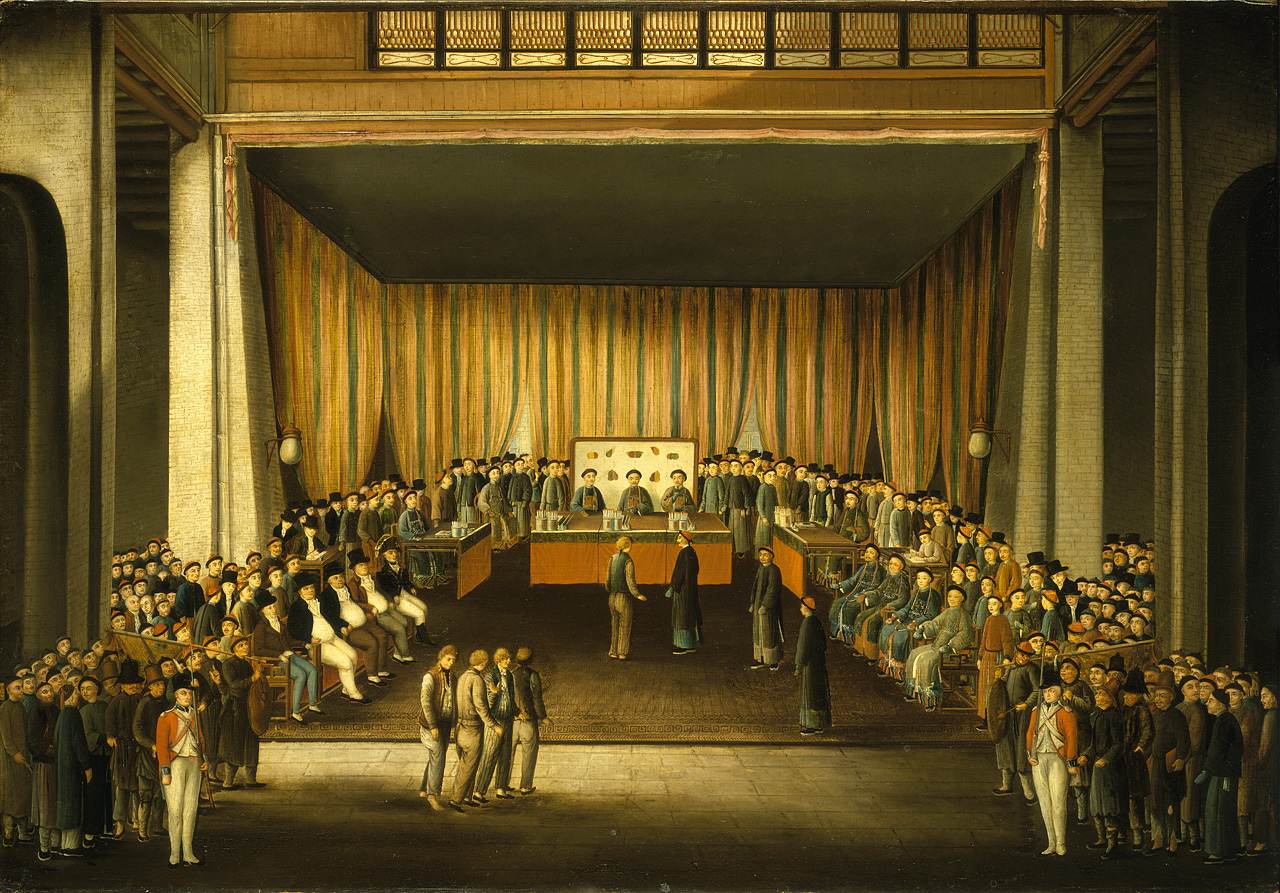
Trial of Four British Seamen at Canton, 1 October 1807

On 8 November 1807 the Mandarin of the Chinese court demanded that the hostage seaman be surrendered to the court. The British refused and the situation worsened until fortuitously HMS Modeste arrived at Macao. The Chinese government signaled that it would not pursue the matter further and the British agreed that the hostage would leave with the next fleet of Indiamen once the sentence of expulsion had been passed. Chinese officials had also received 120,000 dollars from Neptune's Chinese security merchant.

=== EIC voyage #6 (1809–1810) ===
Capt William Donaldson sailed from Portsmouth on 24 February 1809, bound for Bombay and China. Neptune reached Bombay on 25 June and Penang on 31 August, and arrived at Whampoa on 6 November. Homeward bound, she crossed the Second Bar on 22 December, reached St Helena on 21 May 1810, and arrived at The Downs on 28 July.

=== EIC voyage #7 (1812–1813) ===
Captain Donaldson sailed from Torbay on 4 January 1812, bound for Bombay and China. Neptune reached Johanna on 6 April and Bombay on 7 May. On her way to China she was at Penang on 13 July and Malacca on 25 July, before arriving at Whampoa on 22 September. Homeward bound, she crossed the Second Bar on 18 December, reached St Helena on 27 March 1813, and arrived at The Downs on 5 June.

=== EIC voyage #8 (1813–1815) ===
Captain Edward Smith Ellis sailed from Portsmouth on 31 December 1813, bound for Bombay and China. Neptune reached Bombay on 22 May 1814, and arrived at Whampoa on 30 November. Homeward bound, she was at Rajah Basah Roads on 10 February 1815, (Note: Raja Basa Roads were named for the volcano on the Sunda Strait, located at the most south-eastern point of Sumatra 05°47′00″S 105°37′30″E. The Roads are in Lampung Bay.) She reached St Helena on 19 April and arrived at The Downs on 23 June.

=== Private trade ===
By one report between 1815 and 1819 Neptune was in private trade to India as a licensed ship. However, neither Lloyd's Register nor the Register of Shipping for those years provides any corroboration.

== Fate ==
In 1819 Neptune was sold for breaking up.
