= Perseverance (1801 EIC ship) =

History

United Kingdom
- Name: Perseverance
- Owner: EIC voyages 1-6:Sir William Fraser; EIC voyage 7: Henry Templer.
- Builder: Pitcher, Northfleet
- Launched: 5 December 1801
- Fate: Scrapped 1819

General characteristics ,
- Tons burthen: 1271, or 127152/94, or 1335(bm)
- Length: 166 ft 3 in (50.7 m) (overall); 134 ft 5 in (41.0 m) (keel)
- Beam: 42 ft 2 in (12.9 m)
- Depth of hold: 17 ft 0 in (5.2 m)
- Propulsion: Sails
- Sail plan: Full-rigged ship
- Complement: 140
- Armament: 38 × 12&18-pounder guns + 2 × 12-pounder carronades

Perseverance was launched in 1801 as an East Indiaman. She made seven voyages for the British East India Company (EIC), before she was sold in 1819 for breaking up.

== EIC voyages ==
Captain James Tweedale was master of Perseverance for her first five voyages.

=== EIC voyage #1 (1802-1803) ===
Perseverance sailed from Portsmouth on 25 February 1802, bound for Madras and China. She arrived at Madras on 15 June. She reached Penang on 1 August and Malacca on 24 August, and arrived at Whampoa on 16 September. Homeward bound, she crossed the Second Bar on 22 November, reached St Helena on 25 February, and arrived at the Downs on 19 April.

=== EIC voyage #2 (1804-1805) ===
War with France had resumed in 1803 and Tweedale received a Letter of marque on 23 February 1804. Perseverance left Portsmouth on 9 June 1804 bound for China. She was part of a convoy of nine Indiamen, all bound for China: Taunton Castle, Neptune, Arniston, Ceres, Royal Charlotte, Alnwick Castle, True Briton, and Cuffnells. HMS Athenienne provided the escort.

The fleet arrived at Rio de Janeiro around 14–18 August; Perseverance arrived on 17 August. The fleet left Rio on 1 September and later passed the Cape of Good Hope. To avoid French ships reported to be in the Indian Ocean, the fleet sailed towards Western Australia, rather than to the Straits of Malacca.

The fleet sailed to Norfolk Island via Bass Strait; (Note: The fleet also had the objective to improve the charting of Bass Strait.) Norfolk Island was the next rendezvous point after Saint Paul Island, for members that had separated.

Perseverance arrived at Whampoa on 12 January 1805. Homeward bound, she crossed the Second Bar on 14 February, reached Malacca on 21 March and St Helena on 30 June, and arrived in the Downs on 10 September.

=== EIC voyage #3 (1806-1808) ===
Perseverance left Portsmouth on 4 March 1806, bound for Bencoolen and China. She reached St Helena on 21 May and Bencoolen on 16 August. At Bencoolen Perseverance gave passage to Captain Austin Forest and other surviving crew members from Sydney, which had wrecked off New Guinea on 20 May. Perseverance took the men to Penang.

Perseverance reached Penang on 25, or 27 November. She then sailed through the Gillolo Passage between Halmahera and Waigeo in company with Albion and under escort by the British Royal Navy frigate HMS Caroline, Captain Peter Rainier. (Caroline then left them and on 27 December captured the Spanish ship St Raphael (alias Pallas), in a single-ship action. St Raphael proved to be a valuable prize.) Perseverance arrived at Whampoa on 7 February 1807, about a week before Albion. Homeward bound, Perseverance crossed the Second Bar on 13 March, reached Penang on 1 July and St Helena on 13 October, and was at Crookhaven on 17 December. She finally arrived at the Downs on 2 January 1808.

=== EIC voyage #4 (1809-1810) ===
Perseverance left Portsmouth on 24 February 1809, bound for Madras and China. she reached Madeira on 8 March and Madras on 5 July On 9 July Captain William Wildey of the 19th Regiment of Foot, commander of the detachment on board Perseverance, as well as the other army officers traveling as passengers on her, wrote a joint letter of thanks to Captain Tweedale for his attention and kindness to them on the voyage to Madras.

Perseverance reached Penang on 10 August and Malacca on 3 September, before arriving at Whampoa on 4 November. Homeward bound, she crossed the second bar on 21 December, reached St Helena on 22 May 1810, and arrived at the Downs on 28 July.

=== EIC voyage #5 (1811-1812) ===
Perseverance left Portsmouth for China on 8 April 1811. She reached the Cape on 15 July, Penang on 30 August, and Malacca on 19 September. She arrived at Whampoa on 21 October. Homeward bound, she crossed the Second Bar on 14 December, reached St Helena on 21 March, and arrived at the Downs on 14 May.

=== EIC voyage #6 (1812-1814) ===
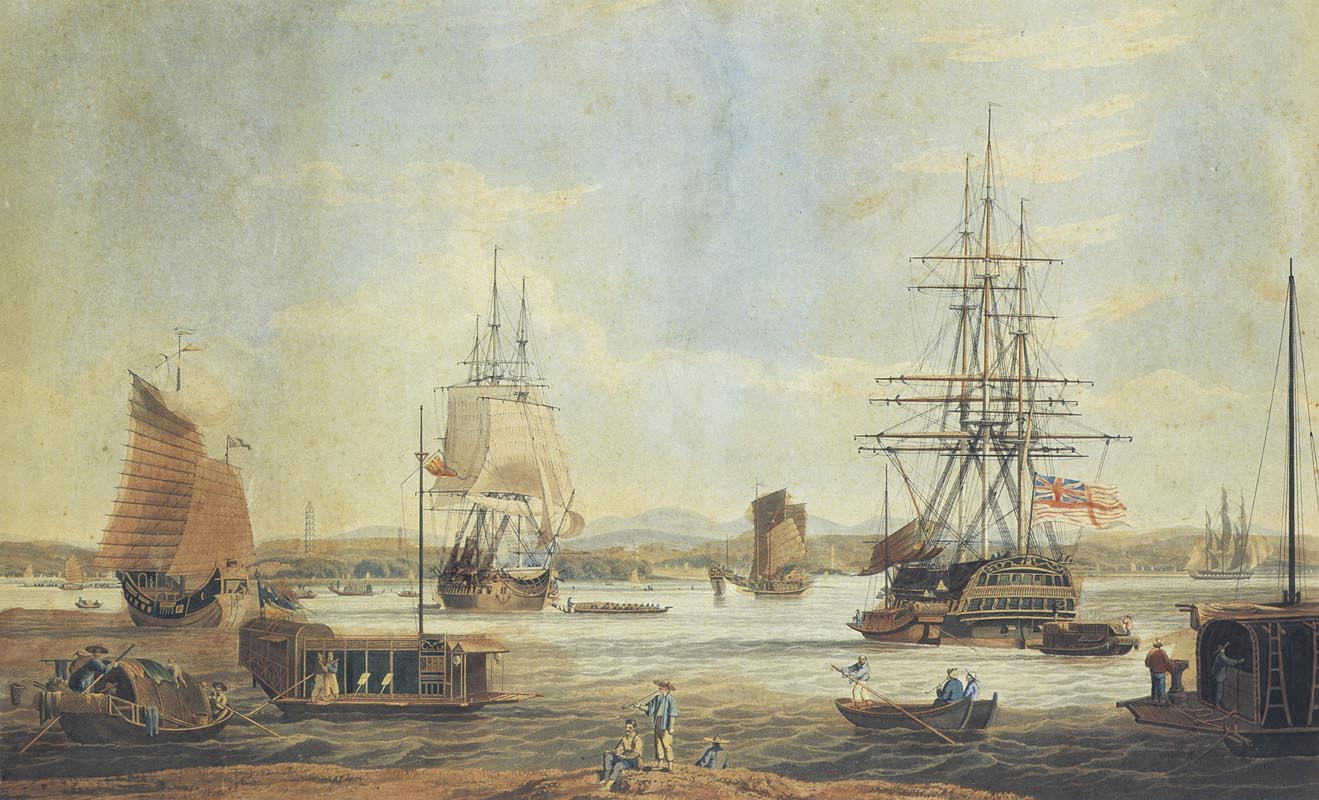
View from Dane's Island of East Indiamen, sampans, and junks at the Whampoa anchorage in the Pearl River in Canton, by William John Huggins

Captain Thomas Buchanan sailed Perseverance on her sixth voyage. He did not receive a letter of marque against the French probably because after the fall of Mauritius France was no longer a threat in the Indian Ocean.

Perseverance left Portsmouth on 24 December 1812 bound for Bombay and China, and reached Bombay on 9 May 1813. She was at Penang on 18 July and Malacca on 7 August. She arrived at Whampoa on 6 September. Homeward bound, she crossed the Second Bar on 5 January 1814, reached St Helena on 26 May, and arrived at the Downs on 6 August.

One of the ordinary seamen serving on Perseverance was William John Huggins, who sketched throughout the voyage and after it became a noted marine artist.

=== EIC voyage $7 (1818-1819) ===
Captain Henry Templer sailed Perseverance from the Downs on 21 April 1818, bound for China. She reached Penang on 1 August and put in there in a leaky state. Still, she was at Malacca on 10 September, at little over a month later, and arrived at Whampoa on 11 October. Homeward bound, she crossed the Second Bar on 12 December, reached the Cape on 21 February 1819 and St Helena on 11 March, and arrived at the Downs on 12 May,

== Fate ==
Perseverance was sold in 1819 for breaking up.
