= Arniston (ship) =

British merchant ship, 1794–1815

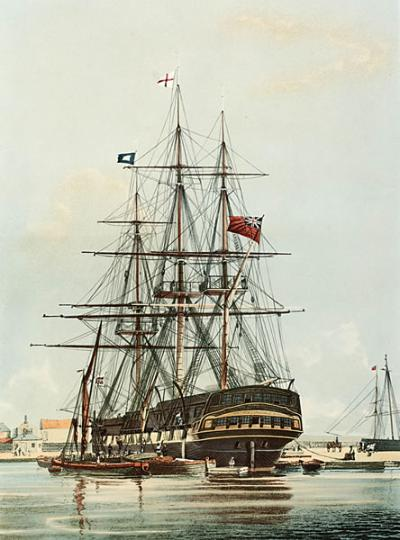
- Repulse, an East Indiaman from the same period and similar in size to Arniston

History

Great Britain
- Owner: Messrs Borradailes of London, 1794–1808: and managed by John Wedderburn; 1809–1813:Managed by Robert Hudson
- Builder: William Barnard, Deptford
- Launched: 1794
- Fate: Wrecked, 3 May 1815 at Waenhuiskrans, South Africa

General characteristics
- Type: East Indiaman
- Tons burthen: 1468, or 14338/94 (bm)
- Length: 176 ft 3 in (53.7 m) (overall); 143 ft 10 in (43.8 m) (keel)
- Beam: 43 ft 3 1/2 in (13.2 m)
- Depth of hold: 17 ft 6 in (5.3 m)
- Propulsion: Sail
- Complement: 120–140 men
- Armament: 1797: 26 × 9 & 12-pounder guns; 1799: 26 × 12-pounder guns; 1804: 28 × 12-pounder guns + 10 × 18-pounder carronades; 1811: 38 × 12-pounder guns

Arniston was a British East Indiaman that made eight voyages for the East India Company (EIC). She was wrecked on 30 May 1815 during a storm at Waenhuiskrans, near Cape Agulhas, South Africa, with the loss of 372 lives – only six on board survived. She had been chartered as a troopship and was underway from Ceylon to England on a journey to repatriate wounded soldiers from the Kandyan Wars.

Controversially, the ship did not have a marine chronometer on board, a comparatively new navigational instrument that was an "easy and cheap addition to her equipment" that would have enabled her to determine her longitude accurately. Instead, she was forced to navigate through the heavy storm and strong currents using older, less reliable navigational aids and dead reckoning. Navigational difficulties and a lack of headway led to an incorrect assumption that Cape Agulhas was Cape Point. Consequently, Arniston was wrecked when her captain headed north for St Helena, operating on the incorrect belief the ship had already passed Cape Point.

== Overview ==
East Indiamen operated under charter or licence to the Honourable East India Company, which held a monopoly granted by Queen Elizabeth I of England for all English trade between the Cape of Good Hope and Cape Horn. Arniston was built by William Barnard at Barnard's Thames Yard at Deptford on the Thames and launched in 1794. She was probably named after Lord Arniston rather than the tiny village of Arniston near Edinburgh.

Arniston was heavily armed, with her fifty-eight guns making her the equivalent of a Royal Navy fourth-rate ship of the line. A classification of "ship of the line" – a class of ship that later evolved into the battleship – meant that a ship was powerful enough to stand in a line of battle and explained why these ships of commerce were sometimes mistaken for men-o-war. The armament was necessary for the ship to protect herself and her valuable cargo from pirates and commerce raiders of other nations during long voyages between Europe and the Far East. Arniston, like other East Indiamen, was slow and unmanoeuvrable, but able to carry a large quantity of cargo.

== Voyages (1794–1812) ==
For her first five voyages she sailed under the ownership and management of John Wedderburn (probably John Wedderburn of Ballindean) and the next three EIC voyages under ownership of Robert Hudson.

Arniston sailed from Great Britain to the Far East eight times before her last voyage. On one of her homeward journeys from China, she struck an uncharted rock at 5°46′8″S 105°16′43″E, near the island of Pulo Goondy (modern day Pulau Legundi), located just south of Sumatra. She did not suffer any ill effects as a result of this incident however, which is mentioned in journals of the time only for its noteworthiness as a navigation hazard to other shipping. (Note: The date of the incident is not documented. Murray et al., primary sources.)

Apart from this and another incident in 1800, Arniston's first eight voyages were uneventful.

=== Voyage number 1: St Helena, Madras, and China (1795–1797) ===
Captain Campbell Marjoribanks:

- 3 April 1795: Portsmouth
- 14 April: Tenerife
- 2 June: St Helena
- 9 August: Cape of Good Hope
- 27 September: Madras
- 14 November: Penang
- 3 December: Malacca
- 11 March 1796: Whampoa
- 23 April: Second Bar
- 29 June: Macau
- 20 November: St Helena
- 1 March 1797: Deptford

While Arniston was at St Helena on her outward journey, she undertook to transport troops from there to join Lord Elphinstone, who was undertaking an expedition to capture Cape Colony from the Dutch. On 10 July George Vancouver arrived in HMS Discovery. Vancouver was returning to England after his four-and-a-half-year long voyage of exploration. He transferred to Arniston four field guns that he had been carrying, together with what ammunition he had left for them, for onward transmission to Elphinstone. Discovery's boats also helped in the ferrying of troops from shore to Arniston.

Arniston was to ferry nine field pieces, as well as a company of artillery and three of infantry (393 men in all), to Elphinstone.

=== Voyage number 2: China (1797–1798) ===
On this voyage Arniston sailed under a letter of marque in the name of Captain William Macnamara, and dated 13 May 1797. Her itinerary was:

- 5 June 1797: Portsmouth
- 29 August: Cape of Good Hope
- 9 December: Whampoa
- 14 February 1798: Second Bar
- 26 March: Macau
- 5 August: St Helena
- 23 October: Long Reach

=== Voyage number 3: St Helena, Benkulen, and China (1800–1801) ===
On this voyage Arniston sailed under a letter of marque in the name of Captain Campbell Marjoribanks, and dated 29 November 1799. Her itinerary was:

- 7 January 1800: Portsmouth
- 4 April: St Helena
- 27 June: Benkulen
- 29 July: Penang
- 27 August: Malacca
- 21 September: Whampoa
- 29 November: Second Bar
- 18 January 1801: Macau
- 15 April: St Helena
- 17 June: Long Reach

During this voyage Arniston had just anchored at Benkulen on 27 June 1800, when the 26-gun French privateer Confiance attacked her. Arniston cut her anchor and gave chase, firing several broadsides into the other ship, but the faster French ship was able to make an escape. On 9 October 1800, the East Indiaman Kent would be less fortunate; Confiance would capture Kent after a two-hour engagement.

=== Voyage number 4: St Helena, Benkulen, and China (1801–1803) ===
Captain Campbell Marjoribanks:

- 31 December 1801: Downs
- 9 March 1802: St Helena
- 10 June: Benkulen
- 12 July: Penang
- 31 August: Whampoa
- 24 October: Second Bar
- 11 February 1803: St Helena
- 26 April: Long Reach

=== Voyage number 5: China (1804–1805) ===
On this voyage Arniston sailed under a letter of marque in the name of Captain James Jameson, and dated 24 March 1804. Her itinerary was:

On 9 June 1804, Arniston left St Helens, Isle of Wight, as part of a convoy of nine East Indiamen of the British East India Company, all bound for China. The Indiamen were Alnwick Castle, Ceres, Cuffnells, Neptune, Perseverance, Royal Charlotte, Taunton Castle, and True Briton. HMS Athenienne provided the escort.

The fleet arrived at Rio de Janeiro around 14–18 August. It then passed the Cape of Good Hope. From here, rather than passing through the Indian Ocean and the Straits of Malacca, the fleet sailed south of Western Australia and through Bass Strait. The objectives were two-fold: to avoid French ships reported to be in the Indian Ocean, and to improve the charting of Bass Strait.

The ships then sailed to Norfolk Island, which was the next rendezvous point after Saint Paul Island, for members that had separated. Taunton Castle had separated in the South Atlantic and although she arrived at Norfolk Island three days after the fleet had sailed on, did not rejoin the rest of the fleet until she arrived at Haerlem Bay, in China.

The arrival of Athenienne and the East Indiamen at Norfolk Island sowed panic among the colonists there who feared that a French flotilla had arrived.

The fleet arrived at Whampoa in mid-January 1805. The fleet then returned to England via the Straits of Malacca. Arniston, for example, crossed the second Bar on 14 February, reached Malacca on 21 March and St Helena on 30 June, and arrived at Long Reach on 15 September.

=== Voyage number 6: China (1806–1807) ===
On this voyage Arniston sailed under a letter of marque in the name of Captain Peter Wedderburn dated 20 March 1806. (Note: Wedderburn was perhaps not a notable individual in his own right, but he was part of a wealthy and well-connected family. For example, his brother was Andrew Colville, and his uncle, John Wedderburn of Ballendean, led the family business.) Her itinerary was:

- 14 May 1806: Portsmouth
- 7 August: Cape of Good Hope
- 10 October: Penang
- 21 January 1807: Whampoa
- 4 May: off Lintin Island
- 1 July: Penang
- 17 July: Acheh
- 19 September: Cape of Good Hope
- 13 October: St Helena
- 6 January 1808: Lower Hope

=== Voyage number 7: Bombay and China (1810–1811) ===
Captain Samuel Landon:

- 21 January 1810: Portsmouth
- 9 April: Cape of Good Hope
- 26 May: Bombay
- 1 September: Penang
- 12 October: Whampoa
- 29 December: Second Bar
- 28 May 1811: St Helena
- 13 August: Long Reach

=== Voyage number 8: Bombay and China (1812–1813) ===
On this voyage Arniston sailed under a letter of marque in the name of Captain Walter Campbell. Her itinerary was:

- 4 January 1812: Torbay
- 5 April: Johanna
- 7 May: Bombay
- 11 September: Whampoa
- 4 January 1813: Macau
- 27 March: St Helena
- 7 June: Long Reach

The British government then chartered Arniston as a troop transport to the Cape and India.

=== Voyage number 9: Madeira, Cape, and Ceylon (1814–1815) ===
Captain George Simpson left England on 8 June 1814. At Ceylon, Arniston embarked soldiers of the 73rd Regiment, who were wounded in the Kandyan Wars in Ceylon, to repatriate them to England.

== Wreck (1815) ==
Western Cape, South Africa

Critically, the ship did not have a chronometer—a comparatively new navigational instrument that was an "easy and cheap addition to her equipment" at the time—for this voyage. Captain George Simpson could not afford the 60–100 guineas for one, and the ship's owners were also unwilling to purchase one, even threatening to replace him with another captain if he refused to set sail without one.

Arniston sailed from Port de Galle on 4 April 1815 in a convoy of six other East Indiamen, under the escort of HMS Africaine and HMS Victor. Among her 378 passengers were many invalid soldiers and sailors, plus 14 women and 25 children.

During the passage from Ceylon, at one o'clock every day, the ships signalled each other their longitude that they calculated using their chronometers. In this way, the ships were able to compare their respective instruments, and the master of the Arniston was able to learn his longitude too, as long as he remained in the convoy.

On 26 May, while rounding the southern tip of Africa, Arniston separated from the convoy in bad weather after her sails were damaged. Without accurate daily longitudinal information from the other ships, Arniston had to rely instead on older, less accurate navigation methods. Navigation via dead reckoning proved particularly difficult as there were strong ocean currents combined with inclement weather that prevented a fix being obtained for several days via celestial navigation.

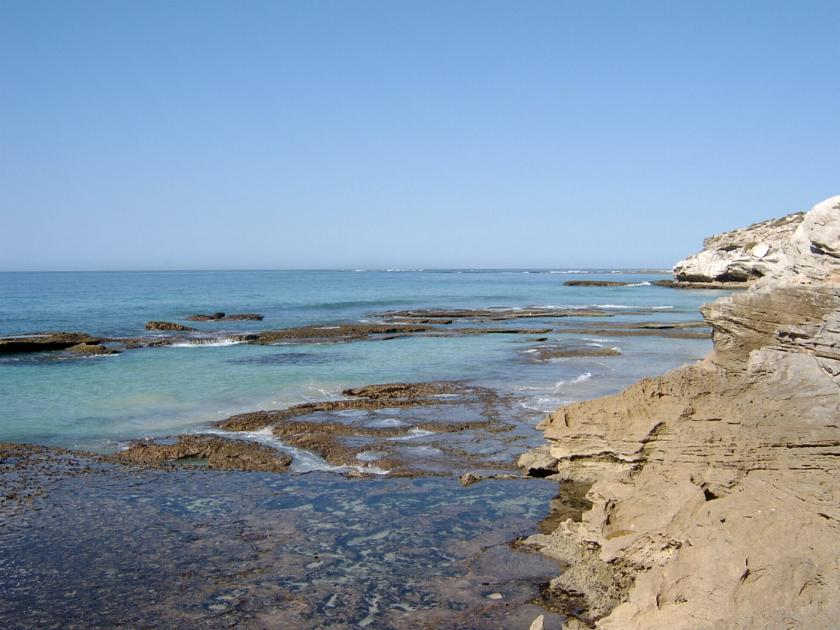
Coastline at Arniston. The seaside village of Waenhuiskrans, Western Cape has become so associated with the wreck that it is known as Arniston.

On 29 May, land was sighted to the north at 7 am, and given the dead reckoning estimates, was presumed to be the Cape of Good Hope. The ship sailed west until 4:30 pm on 29 May, then turned north to run for St Helena. However the land sighted had in fact been Cape Agulhas (then known as "Cape L'Agullas") and the ship had also not made good headway against the current since this sighting. Compounding these navigational errors, the master had not taken any depth soundings (which would have confirmed his location over the Agulhas Bank), before heading north. Consequently, instead of being 100 miles (160 km) west of the Cape of Good Hope as presumed, the ship was closing on the reef at Waenhuiskrans near Cape Agulhas. The anchors were unable to hold the heavy ship in the storm, so on 30 May near 4 pm, Lieutenant Brice advised Captain Simpson to ground the ship to save the lives of those aboard. Eight minutes later, at about 8 pm, the ship struck rocks half a mile offshore and heeled into the wind. The guns on the opposite side were cut away in a failed attempt to level the ship, which soon started to break up in the waves.

Only six men (the ship's carpenter and five sailors of the 378 people on board survived, after reaching the shore only with great difficulty through the high surf. The following morning the sternpost was the only part of the vessel still visible. The ship and her passengers had been lost for lack of a chronometer, or as an officer from the same convoy later wrote:

[T]his valuable ship, and all the lives on board of her, were actually sacrificed to a piece of short-sighted economy. That they might have been saved, had she been supplied with the worst chronometer that was ever sent to sea, is also quite obvious.

== Aftermath ==
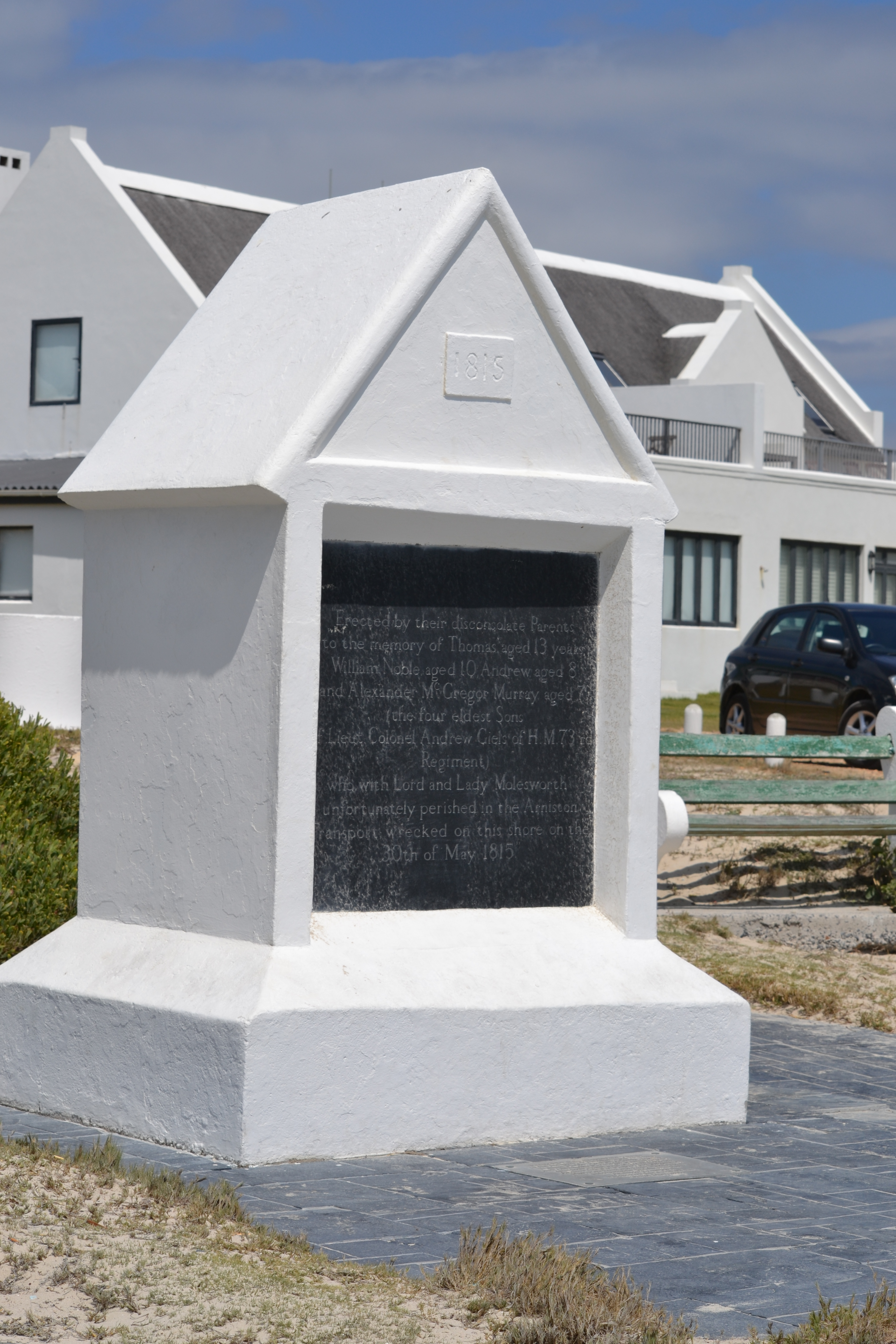
The Arniston memorial

The six survivors buried the bodies found on the beach, then travelled east along the beach, expecting to reach Cape Town. However, after four and a half days, they realised their error and returned to the site of the wreck. Here they subsisted off a cask of oatmeal, while trying to effect repairs to the ship's pinnace, which had been washed ashore. They were discovered six days later on 14 June by a farmer's son, (Note: The farmer's son probably had the Afrikaans name "Jan Zwartz" or perhaps "Jan Swart". The earliest report consulted referred to him as "John Swastry" (AJ 1816:34), but this seems an Anglicisation or phonetic corruption of an oral account. A later report names him "Jan Zwartz" (George Thompson, 1827, Travels and Adventures in Southern Africa, 2nd edition, Vol. 2, p. 405, quoting the account of survivor C. S. Scott in a version slightly different from AJ 1816:34). Later again, we have him as "young Schwartz" (Raikes 1846:527).) who was out hunting.

- Among the victims were: Captain George Simpson, Lieutenant Brice, the 6th Viscount Molesworth and Viscountess Molesworth.
- The six survivors were: Dr. Gunter (boatswain), John Barrett (carpenter), Charles Stewart Scott (carpenter's mate), William Grung (second class), Gibbs (third class), Robinson (fourth class).

A memorial, a replica of which can be seen today, was erected on the beach by the wife of Colonel Andrew Geils (spelled "Giels" in this instance), whose four children were lost in the tragedy on their homeward journey, having visited him in Ceylon. The memorial bears the following inscription: (Note: Note the incorrect date on the memorial, which should be 30 May.)

Erected by their disconsolate parents to the memory of Thomas, aged 13 years, William Noble, aged 10, Andrew, aged 8 and Alexander McGregor Murray, aged 7 (the four eldest sons of Lieut Colonel Andrew Giels of H.M. 73rd Regiment) who, with Lord and Lady Molesworth unfortunately perished in the Arniston Transport, wrecked on this shore on 30th May, 1815.

Over time, the seaside village of Waenhuiskrans has become so associated with the wreck, that it now is also known as Arniston. The nearby town of Bredasdorp has a museum dedicated to the wreck. The wreck had a direct influence on the decision to build a lighthouse at Cape Agulhas to the west in 1847–1848.

Thirty seven years later, the 73rd Regiment once again suffered hundreds of casualties on this coast when HMS Birkenhead was wrecked 50 miles (80 km) away at Gansbaai.

== Archaeological excavation ==
The wreck, which lies in about 6 metres (20 ft) of water, was surveyed by an archaeological team from the University of Cape Town (UCT) in 1982. The National Monuments Council issued a permit to UCT student Jim Jobling to conduct an underwater survey of the site, as well as a limited excavation. A number of artefacts were recovered, which were donated to the Bredasdorp Shipwreck Museum.
