= True Briton (1790 EIC ship) =

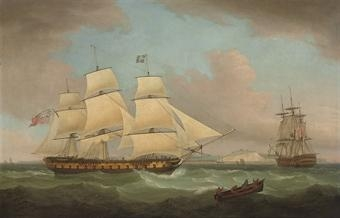
- The East Indiaman True Briton in two positions and calling for a pilot off Dover; Thomas Whitcombe

History

Great Britain
- Name: True Briton
- Owner: EIC voyages #1-4: Robert Wigram; EIC voyages #5-8: Robert Wigram jun.
- Builder: John & William Wells, Deptford
- Launched: 23 November 1790
- Fate: Foundered without a trace in 1809

General characteristics
- Tons burthen: 1198, or 1209, or 120948/94, or 1233,(bm)
- Length: Overall:165 ft 2 in (50.3 m); Keel:134 ft 0 1/2 in (40.9 m) (keel)
- Beam: 41 ft 2 1/4 in (12.6 m)
- Depth of hold: 17 ft 0 in (5.2 m)
- Propulsion: Sails
- Sail plan: Full-rigged ship
- Complement: 1794:130; 1796:135; 1801:120; 1804:130; 1806:135; 1808:135
- Armament: 1794:26 × 12&9-pounder guns; 1796:26 × 9&6-pounder guns; 1801:26 × 12&6-pounder guns; 1804:30 × 12&18-pounder guns; 1806:30 × 12&18-pounder guns; 1808:30 × 18&12-pounder guns
- Notes: Three decks

True Briton was launched in 1790 as an East Indiaman for the British East India Company (EIC). She was lost without a trace in 1809 during her eighth voyage.

== Career ==
The EIC initially engaged True Briton for six voyages. It then engaged her for two more.

=== EIC voyage #1 (1791–1792) ===
(1) 1790/1 Madras and China. Captain Henry Farrer sailed from The Downs on 3 Feb 1791, bound for Madras and China. True Briton arrived at Madras on 31 May. Bound for China, she reached Penang on 7 August, and arrived at Whampoa anchorage on 19 September. Homeward bound, she crossed the Second Bar on 4 December, reached St Helena on 17 March 1792, and arrived at The Downs on 16 May.

=== EIC voyage #2 (1794–1795) ===
War with France had broken out in 1793. Captain Henry Farrer acquired a letter of marque on 31 January 1794.

The British government held True Briton at Portsmouth, together with 38 other Indiamen in anticipation of using them as transports for an attack on Île de France (Mauritius). It gave up the plan and released the vessels in May 1794. It paid £1,098 2s 6d for having delayed her departure by 71 days.

Captain Farrer sailed from Portsmouth on 2 May, bound for Bombay and China. True Briton arrived at Bombay on 4 September. She left on 27 October and arrived at Whampoa on 26 February 1795. Homeward bound, she was crossed the Second Bar on 18 April, reached Batavia on 5 August, reached St Helena on 16 October, and arrived at The Downs on 22 December.

=== EIC voyage #3 (1796–1798) ===
Captain William Stanley Clarke acquired a letter of marque on 27 May 1796. He sailed from Portsmouth on 27 June 1796, bound for the Cape of Good Hope and China. True Briton reached the Cape on 19 September and arrived at Whampoa on 28 January 1797. Homeward bound, she crossed the Second Bar on 14 March, reached the Cape on 2 December and St Helena on 3 January 1798, and arrived at The Downs on 17 March.

=== EIC voyage #4 (1799–1800) ===
Captain Farrer sailed from Portsmouth on 2 April 1799, bound for Madras and China. She returned to her moorings on 30 September 1800.

=== EIC voyage #5 (1801–1803) ===
Captain William Stanley Clarke acquired a letter of marque on 15 January 1801. He sailed from Portsmouth on 31 March 1801, bound for Madras and China. True Briton reached the Cape on 16 June, and arrived at Madras on 6 September. Bound for China, she reached Penang on 7 December and Amboina on 17 January 1802, and arrived at Whampoa on 21 March. Homeward bound, she crossed the Second Bar on 20 May, reached St Helena on 11 October, and arrived at The Downs on 3 January 1803.

=== EIC voyage #6 (1804–1805) ===
Captain Henry Hughes acquired a letter of marque on 2 March 1804. He sailed from Portsmouth on 9 June. True Briton was part of a convoy of nine Indiamen, all bound for China: Alnwick Castle, Arniston, Ceres, Cuffnells, Neptune, Perseverance, Royal Charlotte, and Taunton Castle. HMS Athenienne provided the escort.

The fleet arrived at Rio de Janeiro around 14–18 August; True Briton arrived on 17 August. The fleet left Rio on 1 September and later passed the Cape of Good Hope. To avoid French ships reported to be in the Indian Ocean, the fleet sailed towards Western Australia, rather than to the Straits of Malacca.

The fleet sailed to Norfolk Island via Bass Strait; (Note: The fleet also had the objective to improve the charting of Bass Strait.) Norfolk Island was the next rendezvous point after Saint Paul Island, for members that had separated.

True Briton arrived at Whampoa on 12 January 1805. Homeward bound, she crossed the Second Bar on 15 February, reached St Helena on 30 June, and arrived at The Downs on 8 September.

=== EIC voyage #7 (1807–1808) ===
Captain William Stanley Clarke acquired a letter of marque on 25 November 1806. He sailed from Portsmouth on 26 February 1807, bound for Bombay and China. He sailed from Portsmouth on 26 February 1807. True Briton returned to her moorings on 1 July 1808.

== Fate ==
Captain George Bonham acquired a letter of marque on 22 December 1808. He sailed from Portsmouth on 24 February 1809, bound for Bombay and China. True Briton parted company from the vessels she was in company with on 19 October 1809; (Note: The EIC put the date of loss as 29 September 1809.) she was never seen again. Lloyd's List reported on 31 July 1810 that she had not arrived at China by 5 March.

The EIC valued the cargo that it had lost at £22,000.
