= Alnwick Castle (1801 EIC ship) =

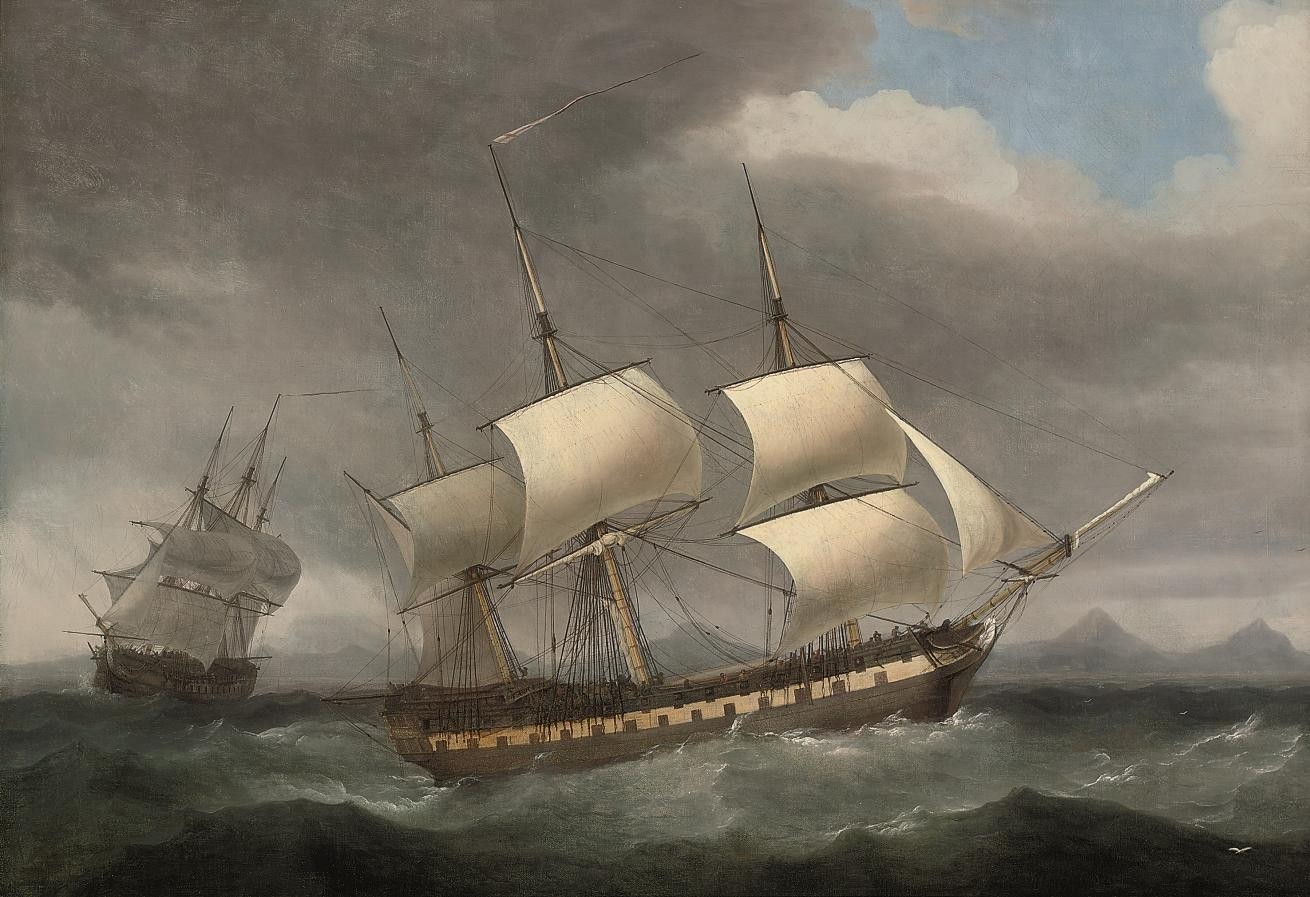
- The East India Company's ship Alnwick Castle in two positions off a mountainous shore, Thomas Whitcombe

History

United Kingdom
- Name: Alnwick Castle
- Namesake: Alnwick Castle
- Owner: John Locke
- Builder: Perry, Blackwall
- Launched: 13 November 1801
- Fate: Sold 1816 for breaking up

General characteristics
- Tons burthen: 1256, 125687/94, or 1311 (bm)
- Length: 165 ft 7 1/2 in (50.5 m) (overall); 133 ft 11 1/2 in (40.8 m) (keel)
- Beam: 42 ft 0 in (12.8 m)
- Depth of hold: 17 ft 7 in (5.4 m)
- Complement: 1804:140
- Armament: 1804: 38 × 18-pounder guns; 1806:38 × 18-pounder guns; 1810:38 × 18-pounder guns
- Notes: Three decks

Alnwick Castle was launched in 1801 as an East Indiaman. She made seven voyages for the British East India Company before her owners sold her in 1816 for breaking up.

== Career ==
=== EIC voyage #1 (1802-1803) ===
Captain Charles Elton Prescott sailed from Portsmouth on 25 February 1802, bound for Madras and China. Alnwick Castle reached Madras on 15 June. She then reached Penang on 1 August and Malacca on 25 August before arriving at Whampoa Anchorage on 14 September. Homeward bound, she crossed the Second Bar on 21 November, reached St Helena on 25 February 1803, and arrived at Long Reach on 25 April.

=== EIC voyage #2 (1804-1805) ===
Captain Albert Gledstanes acquired a letter of marque on 6 March 1804. On 9 June 1804, Alnwick Castle left St. Helens, Isle of Wight, as part of a convoy of nine East Indiamen of the British East India Company, all bound for China. The Indiamen were Perseverance, Neptune, Taunton Castle, Ceres, Royal Charlotte, Arniston, True Briton, and Cuffnells. HMS Athenienne provided the escort.

Alnwick Castle arrived at Rio de Janeiro on 17 August; the other vessels of the fleet arrived between 14 and 18 August. The fleet then passed the Cape of Good Hope. From here, rather than passing through the Indian Ocean and the Straits of Malacca, the fleet sailed south of Western Australia and through Bass Strait. The objectives were two-fold: to avoid French ships reported to be in the Indian Ocean, and to improve the charting of Bass Strait.

The fleet then sailed to Norfolk Island, which was the next rendezvous point after Saint Paul Island, for members that had separated. Taunton Castle had separated in the South Atlantic and although she arrived at Norfolk Island three days after the fleet had sailed on, did not rejoin the rest of the fleet until she arrived at Haerlem Bay, in China.

The arrival of Athenienne and the East Indiamen at Norfolk Island sowed panic among the colonists there who feared that a French flotilla had arrived.

Alnwick Castle arrived at Whampoa 14 January 1805. The fleet then returned to England via the Straits of Malacca. Homeward bound, Alnwick Castle crossed the Second Bar on 15 February, reached Malacca on 21 March and St Helena on 30 June, and arrived at Long Reach on 14 September.

=== EIC voyage #3 (1806-1807) ===
Captain Prescott was again master of Alnwick Castle for this voyage and the next. He acquired a letter of marque on 28 January 1806. He sailed from Portsmouth on 4 March, bound for Madras and China. Alnwick Castle and the Indiamen she was sailing with were "well advanced" in the Mozambique Channel on 28 May. She reached Madras on 29 June. She was at Penang on 15 August and Malacca on 8 September; she arrived at Whampoa on 18 October. Homeward bound, she crossed the Second Bar on 7 December, was at Penang on 23 January 1807, reached St Helena on 18 April, and arrived at Long Reach on 5 July.

On this voyage and the previous, she carried a total of 500 soldiers to Madras. During the four month long voyage, the casualty rate among the soldiers was less than it would have been in garrison due to Prescott's attention to the regulations for the care of soldiers on Indiamen.

Also on this voyage, while Alnwick Castle was at Canton, one of her seamen, Antonio Depardo, alias Depino, killed another crew man in a brawl on shore on 30 December 1806. He was tried at the Old Bailey on 28 October 1807 and found guilty of manslaughter. The trial reveals several interesting details. Depardo was a Spaniard who had been a prisoner of war on board HMS Blenheim, apparently having come to her from a Dutch ship he had joined at the Juan Fernández Islands. (The trial transcript is ambiguous on the sequence of events.) Depardo referred to himself as a prisoner of war, but on Alnwick Castle he was treated a volunteer and paid a bounty on joining and a salary thereafter. The trial took place in England under English law, though the event had occurred in Canton. Lastly, Depardo was given an interpreter at his trial, and the jury was made up half of Englishmen and half of foreigners.

=== EIC voyage #4 (1808-1809) ===
Captain Prescott sailed from Portsmouth on 5 March, again bound for Madras and China. Alnwick Castle reached Madras on 25 June. She was at Penang on 1 August and Malacca on 29 August; she arrived at Whampoa on 6 October. Homeward bound, she crossed the Second Bar on 3 February 1809. She was at Lintin on 28 February and Penang on 30 March. She reached St Helena on 7 July, and arrived at Long Reach on 14 September.

=== EIC voyage #5 (1810-1811) ===
Captain Peter Rolland acquired a letter of marque on 8 February 1810. He sailed from Portsmouth on 28 April, bound for China. As was normal, she sailed in convoy with other Indiamen; HMS Grampus provided the escort. Alnwick Castle reached Penang on 5 September and Malacca on 25 September. She stopped at Manila on 11 November, and arrived at Whampoa on 11 December. Homeward bound, she was at Macao on 21 March 1811. She reached St Helena on 11 July, and arrived at Long Reach on 30 September.

=== EIC voyage #6 (1812-1813) ===
Captain Rolland sailed from Portsmouth on 25 March 1812, bound for China. Alnwick Castle was at Funchal on 24 April. On 5 June she and the other Indiamen in the convoy were "all well" at 22°S 27°W in the South Atlantic, and still under convoy by HMS Theban. Alnwick Castle reached Batavia on 10 August and arrived at Whampoa on 20 September. Homeward bound, she crossed the Second Bar on 4 December. She reached St Helena on 28 March 1813, and arrived at Long Reach on 8 June.

=== EIC voyage #7 (1815-1816) ===
Captain Rolland sailed from the Downs on 27 April 1815, bound for China, and arrived at Whampoa on 25 September. Homeward bound, Alnwick Castle left Whampoa on 14 January 1816, reached St Helena on 23 March, and arrived at Long Reach on 15 May.

WhenAlnwick Castle arrived back in England, she discharged her crew, including 30 Chinese sailors. Princess Amelia repatriated them together with 350 Chinese sailors stranded in London. She sailed on 20 July.

== Fate ==
In 1816 her owners sold Alnwick Castle for breaking up.
