= Samuel Atkins =

British painter

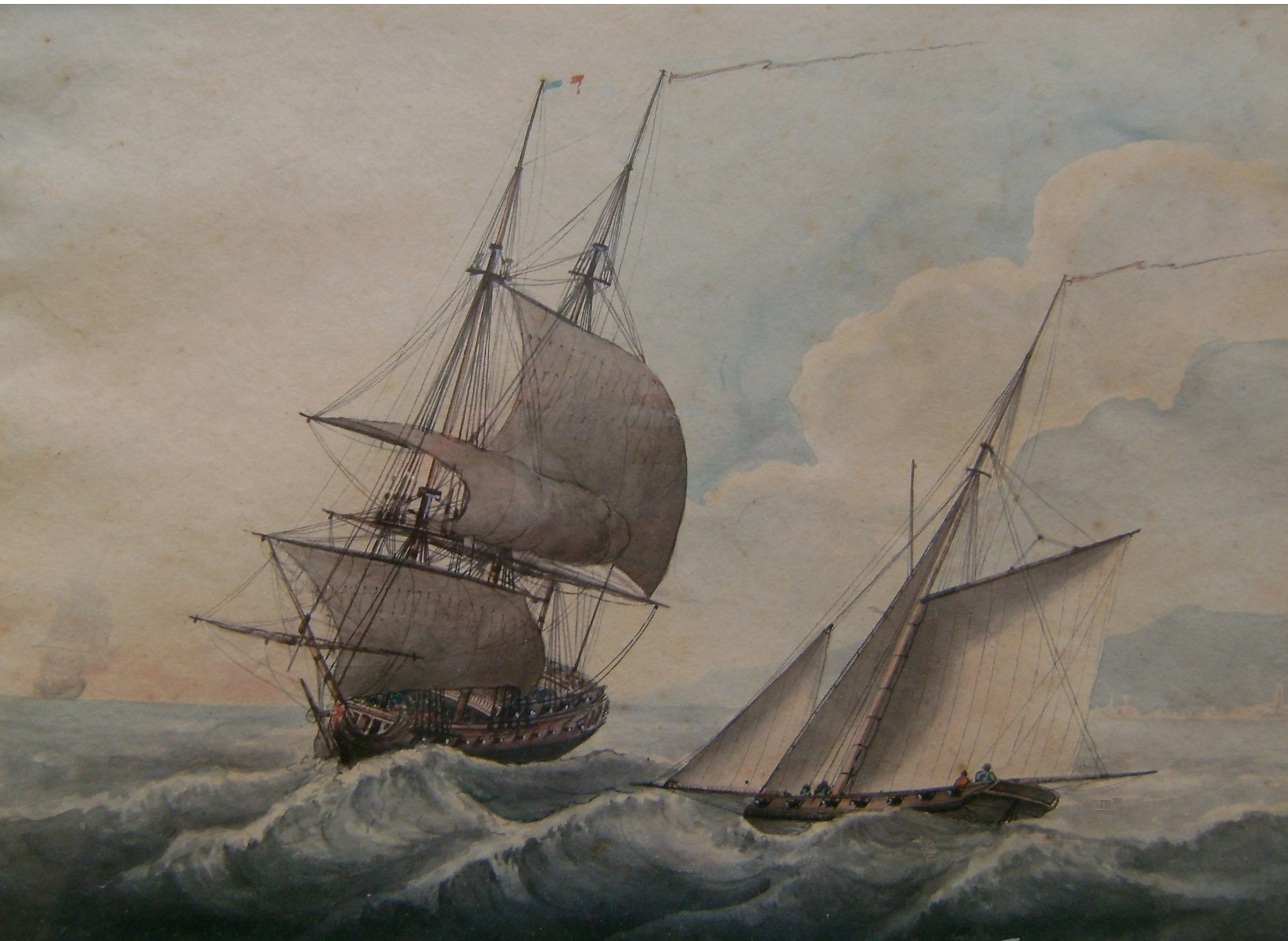
"Frigate in a swell", circa 1800.

Samuel Atkins (fl. 1787–1808), was a British marine painter .

Atkins contributed to the Royal Academy between 1787 and 1796. From 1796 to 1804 he was in the East Indies, when he returned to England, and continued to exhibit until 1808. He worked in oil and water-colour. The water-colour collections of South Kensington and the British Museum have each an example of his work. It is rather early in manner, low in tone, quiet, and truthful. A picture of ‘Shakespeare's Cliff, Dover,’ has been engraved after him by R. and D. Havell. Nagler attributes to this Samuel Atkins the originals of two engravings of sea-subjects after ‘— Atkins:’ ‘Ships in Sight of Harbour,’ engraved in aquatint by H. Merke; and ‘A Sea Piece,’ by F. Janinet. A water-colour drawing also, ‘Seascape with Ships,’ he gives to this painter.

== Gallery ==
Unidentified Royal Navy frigate or sloop of war (ca 1787-1800), in the collection at the Mariners' Museum, Newport News, Virginia

Unidentified British Naval ship in the collection at the Mariners' Museum

Brig in a breeze off a harbor in the collection at the Mariners' Museum

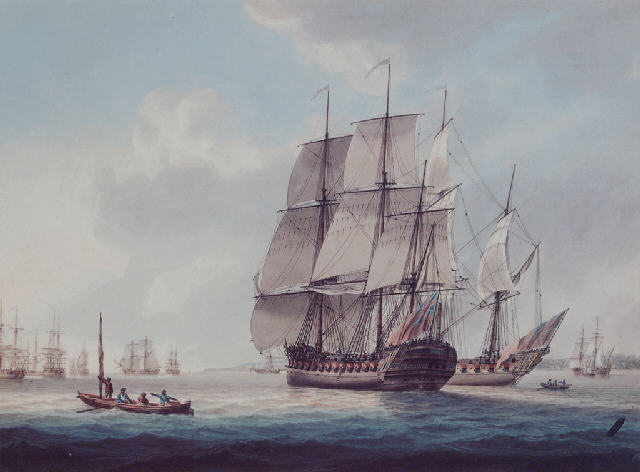
The East Indiaman Woodford near Plymouth
