= Ocean (1788 EIC ship) =

History

British East India Company
- Name: Ocean
- Owner: William Fraser (principal managing owner)
- Builder: Wells, Deptford
- Launched: 30 October 1788
- Fate: Wrecked 1 February 1797; Scuttled 5 February 1797

General characteristics
- Tons burthen: 1189, or 1,18951/94(bm)
- Length: 136 ft 4 in (41.6 m) (overall), 132 ft 2 3/4 in (40.3 m) (keel)
- Beam: 41 ft 1 1/2 in (12.5 m)
- Depth of hold: 17 ft 0 in (5.2 m)
- Sail plan: Full-rigged ship
- Complement: 125 men
- Armament: 26 × 6-pounder guns

Ocean was an East Indiaman launched in 1788 that made four voyages for the British Honourable East India Company between February 1789 and February 1797, when she was wrecked on the island of Kalatea (7°9′S 121°00′E) in the East Indies.

== Voyages ==
East Indiamen traveled in convoys as much as they could. Vessels of the British Royal Navy often escorted these convoys, though generally not past India, or before on the return leg. Even so, the Indiamen were heavily armed so that they could dissuade pirates and even large privateers.

=== Voyage #1 (1789–90) ===
For her first voyage, Ocean sailed to Madras and China under the command of Captain James Tod (or Todd). She left Torbay on 26 February 1789, and 10 March she reached Madeira. She then left Madras on 24 June, reaching Whampoa on 26 September. She crossed the Second Bar on 10 January 1790, and reached Saint Helena on 15 April. She arrived back at the Downs on 6 June.

=== Voyage #2 (1791–93) ===
For her second voyage, Ocean was under the command of Captain Andrew Patton, who would remain her captain for the next three voyages. This was his fifth voyage to the east for the company, and his second on Ocean, as he had been her first lieutenant on her previous trip under Tod. On this voyage, Patton sailed her for St Helena, Madras and China. She left the Downs on 17 December 1791 and reached St Helena on 27 February 1792. From there she went on to Madras, which she reached on 10 May. By 23 June, she was at Penang, and one month later, on 25 July, she was at Malacca. She reached Whampoa on 16 August, and on her return trip she crossed the Second Bar on 3 November. She reached St Helena by 12 February 1793, and the Downs by 17 April.

The EIC inspected the East Indiamen as they arrived and on 15 October fined Patton and ten other captains £100 each for having not stowed their cargoes in conformance with the Company's orders. The money was to go to Poplar Hospital. (Note: There was a second assessment, on 30 July 1794 of a fine, but whether this was a restatement or a separate assessment is unclear.)

=== Voyage #3 (1794–95) ===
When Ocean was ready to sail, the British government held her at Portsmouth, together with a number of other Indiamen in anticipation of using them as transports for an attack on Île de France (Mauritius). It gave up the plan and released the vessels in May 1794. It paid £586 13s 4d for having delayed her departure by 22 days.

Captain Patton left Portsmouth on 2 May, bound for China. Ocean arrived at Whampoa on 27 September. She crossed the Second Bar on 3 December, homeward bound. She arrived at St Helena on 13 April 1795, and the Downs on 23 July. Because this voyage began after the start of the French Revolutionary Wars, Ocean sailed under a letter of marque issued to Captain Andrew Patton on 22 February 1794. The letter authorized her to take prizes should the opportunity arise.

=== Voyage #4 (1796 to loss) ===
Ocean's fourth voyage was again to Madras and China. Patton left Portsmouth on 17 May 1796, and arrived at the Cape of Good Hope on 2 August. From there she sailed to Madras, which she reached in November. She arrived at Colombo on 7 December.

From there she sailed to China in company with five other Indiamen: Alfred, Captain James Farquharson; Woodford, Captain Charles Lennox; Taunton Castle, Captain Edward Studd; Canton, Captain Abel Vyvyan; and Boddam, Captain George Palmer. Farquahrson was the senior captain of the fleet and hence Commodore.

On 28 January 1797 the Indiamen were off the east end of Java heading northward through the Bali Strait Here they encountered Admiral de Sercey and his squadron of frigates, who had left Batavia and was sailing southward through the Bali Straits on his way back to Mauritius. (Note: Since at least James, accounts of the encounter have declared the Indiamen homeward bound. As the voyage records and an examination of maps make clear, they were outward bound to China.)

Farquharson realized that he could not outrun the French force and instead decided on a bluff. He hoisted the flag of Commodore Rainier, the British commander in chief in the East Indies, and made his other ships hoist pendants and ensigns to correspond. Farquharson then detached two of his ships to chase and reconnoitre the enemy. As these advanced towards the French reconnoitering frigate Cybèle (commanded by Captain Thréouart), the latter crowded sail to join her consorts, with the signal at her mast-head, "The enemy is superior in force to the French." Afraid of being unable to repair his frigates and under express orders to avoid giving battle led de Sercey to behave with discretion rather than valour; he withdrew. The bluff made Farquharson a celebrity and was greeted with rejoicing by the British press. (Note: Some six years later a second fleet of British East Indiamen, including a new Ocean, would pull a similar bluff, though with some exchange of fire, in the battle of Pulo Aura.)

On 1 February, a storm caused Ocean to strike a reef off Kalatea (7°9′S 121°0′E). (Note: This seems to be Pulao Kalaotoa, one of a four-island group that lie between Sulawesi in the north and Flores, some 70 miles to the south.) Patton sent the ship's cutter to contact the locals. The crew scuttled Ocean on 5 February; in the evacuation, the ship's boats, except for the longboat, were lost, and two crewmen drowned. The crew then camped on the shore. On 15 February, locals attacked the survivors, killing seven and wounding four. On 18 February, the British left the island in the long boat and three hired proas. Patton and his men reached Amboina on 28 February, after having sailed some 500 miles.

On her homeward voyage from China a storm damaged Taunton Castle, forcing her to stop at Ambonya on 16 September 1797. There she took on board survivors from Ocean. Taunton Castle reached Yarmouth on 7 February 1798. (Note: Captain Patton went on to command a second Ocean for the company. He died in Bombay in 1803 at age 42 while on his second voyage in her.)

The EIC valued the cargo lost on her at £63,216. (Note: The report of the loss is unambiguous that Ocean was on the outward bound leg to China.)
