= Alfred (1790 EIC ship) =

British East Indiaman 1790–1812

History

Great Britain
- Name: Alfred
- Owner: EIC voyage #1:James Farquharson; EIC voyages 2-6:William Fraser; EIC voyages 7-8:Andrew Timbrell
- Operator: British East India Company
- Builder: Todd & Pitcher, Northfleet
- Launched: 16 October 1790
- Fate: Sold 1812

General characteristics
- Tons burthen: 1,211, or 1,21146/94, or 1255 (bm)
- Length: 165 ft 2 1/2 in (50.4 m) (overall), 134 ft 0 in (40.8 m) (keel)
- Beam: 41 ft 5 in (12.6 m)
- Depth of hold: 17 ft 2 1/2 in (5.2 m)
- Sail plan: Full-rigged ship
- Complement: 1794:125; 1803:135; 1806:135
- Armament: 1794: 26 × 9&6-pounder guns; 1803:28 × 12-pounder guns; 1806:32 × 12&18-pounder guns + two swivel guns
- Notes: Three decks

Alfred was launched in 1790 as an East Indiaman for the British East India Company (EIC). She made eight voyages for the EIC before she was sold. She participated in two notable incidents in which East Indiamen bluffed superior French naval forces from engaging. In January 1797, on her third voyage, in the Bali Strait Alfred and five other Indiamen sent off a French squadron of six frigates without a shot being fired. In February 1804, at Pulo Aura, during her sixth voyage she participated in a notable engagement with a French squadron. After her last voyage for the EIC Alfred served as a storeship and a hulk.

== Career ==
=== EIC voyage #1 (1791-1792) ===
Captain James Farquharson sailed from Torbay on 2 February 1791, bound for St Helena, Madras, and China. Alfred reached St Helena on 28 March, St Helena on 13 June, and Penang on 17 July. She arrived at Whampoa anchorage on 25 August. Homeward bound, she crossed the Second Bar on 23 October, reached St Helena on 22 February 1792, and arrived at Long Reach on 18 April. Long Reach.

=== EIC voyage #2 (1794-1795) ===
War with France broke out in 1793, so following the EIC's standard operating procedure on 22 February 1794 Farquharson received a letter of marque.

The British government held her at Portsmouth, together with a number of other Indiamen in anticipation of using them as transports for an attack on Île de France (Mauritius). It gave up the plan and released the vessels in May 1794. It paid £241 17s 6d for having delayed her departure by 9 days.

Farquharson sailed on 2 May 1794 from Portsmouth, bound for China. Alfred arrived at Whampoa on 6 October. Homeward bound, she crossed the Second Bar on 23 December, reached St Helena on 13 April 1795, and arrived at Long Reach on 25 July.

=== EIC voyage #3 (1796-1798) ===
Farquharson sailed from Portsmouth on 17 May 1796 bound for China. Alfred reached the Cape on 2 August, Madras on 11 November and Colombo on 28 November. There she gathered five other Indiamen, Boddam, Canton, Ocean, Taunton Castle, and Woodford. As the senior EIC captain, Farquharson was the commodore of the fleet. Together they sailed for Canton.

On 28 January 1797 the Indiamen were off Java when they encountered six French frigates. (Note: Since at least James, accounts of the encounter have declared that there were five Indiamen and that they were homeward bound. As the voyage records and an examination of maps make clear, the six Indiamen were outward bound to China. The French squadron was coming from Batavia and had sailed south through the Bali Straits when they met the Indiamen.)

Farquharson proceeded to organize a bluff. To give the impression that the convoy consisted of the powerful ships of the line that the Indiamen resembled, Farquharson ordered his ships to advance in line of battle, and the French retreated, convinced they were facing a superior force. The Indiamen sailed east and then up towards China. Ocean wrecked in a storm the next day.

Alfred was at Amboina on 9 February 1797 where she advised that Ocean had wrecked. Alfred arrived at Whampoa on 8 April; the other four surviving East Indiamen also arrived that day or the next. Homeward bound, Alfred crossed the Second Bar on 9 June, reached the Cape on 2 December and St Helena on 3 January 1798, and arrived at Gravesend on 3 April. On his return, the EIC thanked Farquharson and awarded him 500 guineas.

=== EIC voyage #4 (1799-1800) ===
Farquharson sailed from Portsmouth on 2 April 1799, bound for Madras and China. Alfred reached Madras on 31 July, Penang on 18 September, Malacca on 10 October, Balambangan on 6 December, and Sulu on 25 December. She arrived at Whampoa on 16 February 1800. Homeward bound, she crossed the Second Bar on 27 February, reached St Helena on 15 July, and arrived at Northfleet on 30 September.

=== EIC voyage #5 (1801-1802) ===
Farquharson sailed from Portsmouth on 19 May 1801, bound for China. Alfred was at Rio de Janeiro on 31 July, Penang on 31 October, and Malacca on 25 November. She reached Whampoa on 31 January 1802. Homeward bound she crossed the Second Bar on 20 March, reached St Helena on 10 July, and arrived at Northfleet on 17 September.

=== EIC voyage #6 (1803-1804) ===
Captain Farquharson sailed from the Downs on 6 May 1803, bound for China. War with France had resumed so Farquharson required a new letter of marque. He received one on 1 July 1803, i.e., in absentia.

Alfred arrived at Whampoa on 13 October. The Royal Navy was unable to provide an escort and the captains of the EIC's China Fleet debated about setting out for home. Farquharson in particular opposed sailing without an escort. Still, the Fleet crossed the Second Bar on 31 January 1804.

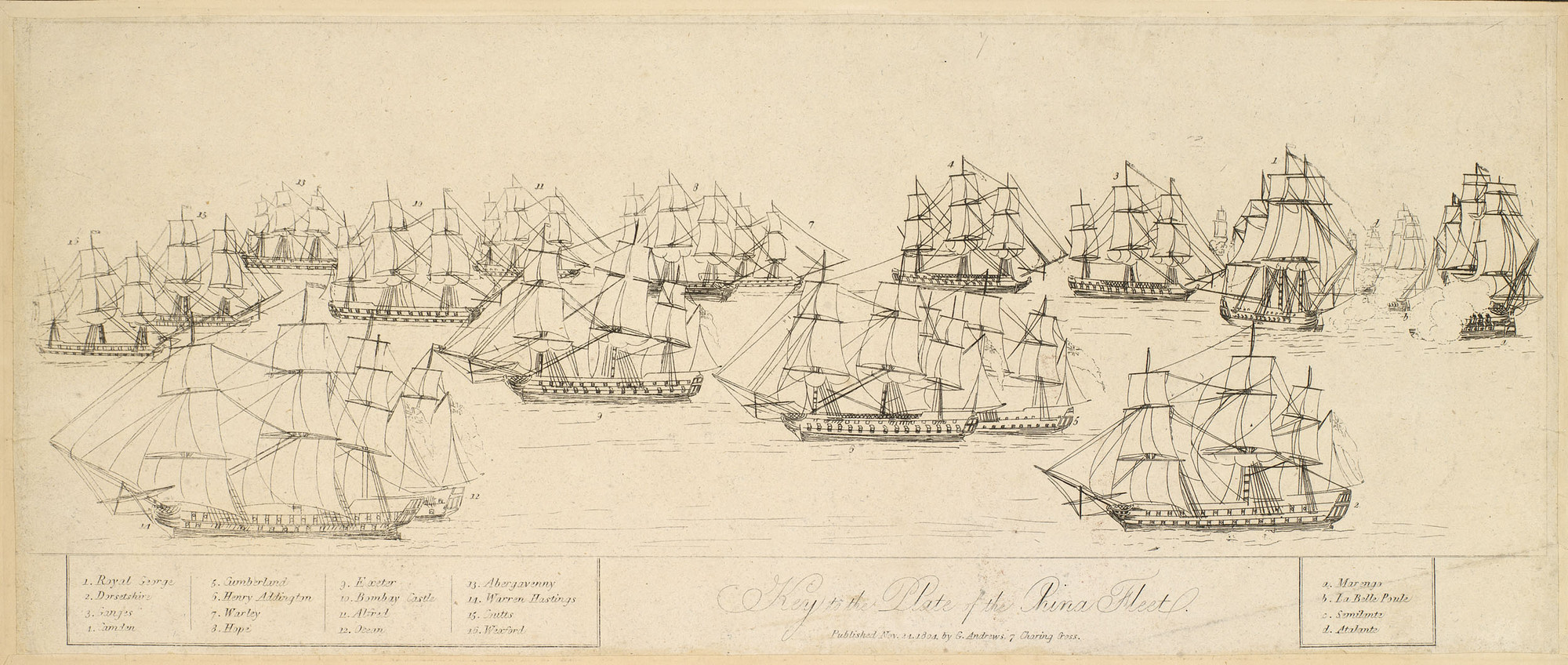
Alfred can be seen in this printed key for a view of the Battle, showing the China Fleet a painting by Francis Sartorius, the younger after a drawing by an officer on board the Henry Addington

On 14 February 1804, the China Fleet, under the command of Commodore Nathaniel Dance, intimidated, drove off and chased a powerful French naval squadron at Pulo Aura. Dance's aggressive tactics persuaded Contre-Admiral Charles-Alexandre Durand Linois to retire after only a brief exchange of fire. Dance then chased the French warships until his convoy was out of danger, whereupon he resumed his passage towards British India. Alfred was one of the Indiamen that actually exchanged fire with the French, in her case for about 15 minutes, and that at long range.

Alfred reached Malacca on 19 February. On 28 February, the British ships of the line HMS Sceptre and Albion joined the Fleet in the Strait and conducted them safely to Saint Helena in the South Atlantic.

Alfred was at Penang on 1 March, and reached St Helena on 9 June. HMS Plantagenet escorted the convoy from St Helena to England. Alfred arrived at Northfleet on 16 August.

On their return to England Nathaniel Dance and his fellow captains were highly praised. Saving the convoy prevented both the EIC and Lloyd's of London from likely financial ruin, the repercussions of which would have had profound effects across the British Empire. The various commanders and their crews were presented with a £50,000 prize fund to be divided among them, and the Lloyd's Patriotic Fund and other national and mercantile institutions made a series of awards of ceremonial swords, silver plate and monetary gifts to individual officers. Lloyd's Patriotic Fund in particular gave each captain a sword worth 50 pounds.

=== EIC voyage #7 (1807-1808) ===
A change of captain necessitated a new letter of marque. Captain George Wellstead received one on 23 December 1806. He sailed Alfred on 26 February 1807 from Portsmouth, bound for St Helena, Bencoolen, and China. Alfred reached St Helena on 15 May and Bencoolen on 9 September. She was at Penang on 20 November and Malacca on 20 December, and arrived at Whampoa on 14 February 1808. Homeward bound, she reached Penang on 4 April and St Helena on 6 July. She arrived at Long Reach on 14 September.

=== EIC voyage #8 (1810-1811) ===
Welstead sailed from Portsmouth on 19 February 1810, bound for Madras and China. She reached Teneriffe on 18 March and Madras on 7 July. She was at Penang on 18 August and Malacca on 10 September, and arrived at Whampoa on 11 October. Homeward bound she crossed the Second Bar on 25 December, reached St Helena on 16 May 1811, and arrived at Northfleet on 13 August.

== Fate ==
Alfred was sold at Lloyd's Coffeehouse on 29 January 1812. She became a storeship and later was hulked.
