= Woodford (1790 EIC ship) =

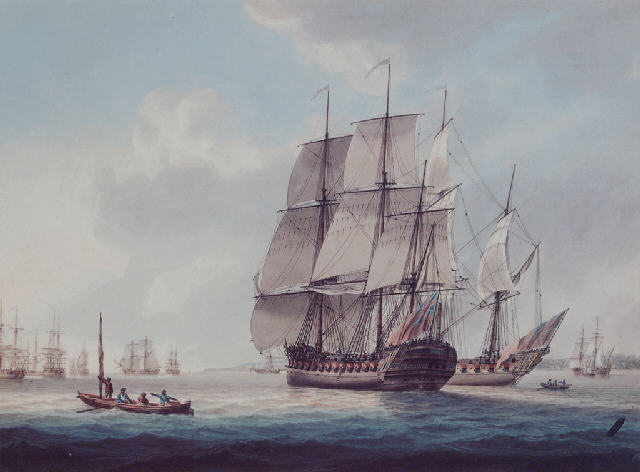
- The East Indiaman Woodford near Plymouth, Samuel Atkins

History

United Kingdom
- Name: Woodford
- Owner: EIC voyages #1–6:Sir Robert Preston; EIC voyages 7–8:Sir Robert Wigram (Note: Two sources have ownership changing after the seventh voyage.)
- Builder: Perry, Blackwall,
- Launched: 22 November 1790
- Fate: Sold 1812

General characteristics
- Tons burthen: 1,180, or 1,206, or 1,20613/94, or 1,210, (bm)
- Length: 163 ft 7 in (49.9 m) (overall), 132 ft 5 1/2 in (40.4 m) (keel)
- Beam: 41 ft 4 1/2 in (12.6 m)
- Depth of hold: 17 ft 3 in (5.3 m)
- Sail plan: Full-rigged ship
- Complement: 1794:160; 1799:130; 1803:20; 1806:130
- Armament: 1794: 36 × 18- & 12- & 6-pounder guns; 1799: 36 × 18- & 12- & 6-pounder guns; 1803: 26 × 12-pounder guns; 1806: 30 × 18-pounder guns + six swivel guns
- Notes: Three decks

Woodford was launched in 1790 and made nine voyages as an East Indiaman for the British East India Company (EIC). In 1797 her captain was commodore of a small group of East Indiamen that managed to bluff a French squadron of warships into sailing away to avoid an engagement. In 1812 Woodford was sold for breaking up.

== Career ==
=== EIC voyage #1 (1791–1792) ===
Captain Charles Lennox sailed from the Downs on 27 March 1791, bound for Bencoolen and China. Woodford reached Bencoolen on 25 July and arrived at Whampoa Anchorage on 6 October. Homeward bound, she crossed the Second Bar on 13 January 1792, reached St Helena on 3 April, and arrived at the Downs on 17 May.

=== EIC voyage #2 (1794–1795) ===
Captain Charles Lennox received a letter of marque on 20 February 1794.

The British government held Woodford at Portsmouth, together with a number of other Indiamen in anticipation of using them as transports for an attack on Île de France (Mauritius). It gave up the plan and released the vessels in May 1794. It paid £1666 5s for having delayed her departure by 62 days.

Captain Lennox sailed from Portsmouth on 2 May, bound for Bombay and China. Woodford reached Bombay on 4 September and arrived at Whampoa on 26 February 1795. Homeward bound, she crossed the Second Bar on 19 May and reached Batavia on 5 August. She reached St Helena on 16 October, and arrived at the Downs on 21 December.

=== EIC voyage #3 (1796–1798) ===
Captain Lennox sailed from Portsmouth on 17 May 1796 bound for Bombay and China. Woodford reached Bombay on 5 September and Colombo on 9 December.

At Colombo Woodford met up with five other East Indiamen,: Alfred, Ocean, Taunton Castle, Canton, and Boddam (1787 EIC ship). The fleet sailed towards China under the overall command of Captain James Farquahrson in Alfred, who was the senior captain and so commodore of the fleet. On 28 January 1797 the Indiamen were off Java when they encountered six French frigates. (Note: Since at least James, accounts of the encounter have declared the Indiamen to have been homeward bound. As the voyage records and an examination of maps make clear, they were outward bound to China. The French squadron was coming from Batavia and had sailed south through the Bali Straits after they met the Indiamen.)

Farquharson proceeded to organize a bluff. To give the impression that the convoy consisted of the powerful ships of the line that the Indiamen resembled, Farquharson ordered his ships to advance in line of battle, and the French retreated, convinced they were facing a superior force. The Indiamen sailed east and then up towards China. Ocean wrecked in a storm the next day, but Woodford and the other four Indiamen arrived at Whampoa on 8 or 9 April.

Homeward bound, she crossed the Second Bar on 9 June, reached the Cape of Good Hope on 3 December and St Helena on 3 January 1798, and arrived at the Downs on 17 March.

=== EIC voyage #4 (1799–1800) ===
Captain James Martin received a letter of marque on 20 March 1799. On 13 June he sailed form Portsmouth, bound for Bombay. Woodford reached Rio de Janeiro on 13 August and arrived at Bombay on 6 December. She sailed form Bombay on 23 January 1800 in company with Albion to gather pepper on the Malabar Coast prior to returning to England. On 1 February 1800 she was at Anjengo. From there she sailed to Quilon, which she reached 4 four days later. Woodford and Albion were at Anjengo again on 15 February, and then homeward bound, they reached St Helena on 15 May. Woodford and Albion arrived at the Downs on 3 August.

=== EIC voyage #5 (1801–1802) ===
Captain James Martin sailed from Portsmouth on 19 May 1801 bound for China. Woodford reached Rio de Janeiro on 31 July and Penang on 31 October, and arrived at Whampoa on 1 February 1802. Homeward bound, she crossed the Second Bar on 30 March, reached St Helena on 10 July, and arrived at the Downs on 11 September.

=== EIC voyage #6 (1803–1805) ===
In the months before the resumption of war with France, the Navy started preparations that included impressing seamen. The crews of outbound Indiamen were an attractive target. Woodford and Ganges were sitting in the Thames in March 1803, taking their crews on board just prior to sailing. At sunset, a press gang from HMS Immortalite rowed up to Woodford, while boats from HMS Amethyst and HMS Lynx approached Ganges. As the press gangs approached they were noticed, and the crews of both Indiamen were piped to quarters. That is, they assembled on the decks armed with pikes and cutlasses, and anything they could throw. The officers in charge of the press gangs thought this mere bravado and pulled alongside the Indiamen, only to meet a severe resistance from the crewmen, who had absolutely no desire to serve in the Royal Navy. The men from Immortalite suffered several injuries from shot and pike that were thrown at them, and eventually the marines opened fire with muskets, killing two sailors on Woodford. Even so, the press gangs were not able to get on board either Indiaman, and eventually withdrew some distance. When Woodford's officers finally permitted the press gang from Immortalite to board, all they found on board were a few sickly sailors.

Because war with France had resumed, James Martin required a new letter of marque, which he received on 20 June. The letter gives an anomalously low number for the size of Woodford's crew. (Ganges's letter of marque had been issued in February, i.e., before the incident, and reports a crew size of 135 men.)

Captain Martin sailed from Portsmouth on 21 May 1803, bound for China. Woodford arrived at Whampoa on 24 January 1804. Homeward bound, she crossed the Second Bar on 9 March and reached Penang on 21 April. She left Penang on 10 August in company with Maria and Hugh Inglis. Woodford reached St Helena on 15 November and arrived at the Downs on 7 February 1805.

=== EIC voyage #7 (1807–1808) ===
Captain Martin received another letter of marque on 12 March 1807. (This one gave her crew size as 130 men.) Martin sailed from Portsmouth on 19 April, bound for China. Woodford reached Penang on 14 September and Malacca on 21 October, and arrived at Whampoa on 4 January 1808. Homeward bound, she crossed the Second Bar on 10 March, reached St Helena on 9 July, and arrived at the Downs on 12 September.

=== EIC voyage #8 (1810–1811) ===
Captain Martin sailed from Portsmouth on 19 February 1810, bound for Madras and China. Woodford reached Madras on 10 July, Penang on 17 August, and Malacca on 11 September, before arriving at Whampoa on 12 October. Homeward bound, she crossed the Second Bar on 11 January 1811, reached St Helena on 29 May, and arrived at the Downs on 8 August.

== Fate ==
Woodford was described as worn out after having made eight voyages. She was sold in 1812 for breaking up.
