= Boddam (1787 EIC ship) =

British East Indiaman 1787–1803

History

Great Britain
- Name: Boddam
- Namesake: Charles Boddam
- Owner: William Palmer
- Operator: British East India Company
- Builder: Barnard, Deptford
- Launched: 27 December 1787
- Fate: Sold 1803

General characteristics
- Tons burthen: 1021 (bm)
- Length: 128 ft 0 in (39.0 m) (keel)
- Beam: 38 ft 6 in (11.7 m)
- Sail plan: Full-rigged ship
- Complement: 1793:100; 1796:124; 1801:110
- Armament: 1793: 26 × 9&4-pounder guns; 1796:32 × 12&6-pounder guns; 1801:38 × 12&6&4-pounder guns
- Notes: Three decks

Boddam was built by William Barnard at Barnard's Thames Yard at Deptford and was launched on 27 December 1787 on the River Thames. She made six voyages as an East Indiaman for the British East India Company (EIC). Her fourth voyage (in 1796–1798) was particularly notable as she participated in an encounter between six Indiamen and six French frigates in which the Indiamen succeeded in bluffing the French into withdrawing. During that voyage she also survived several typhoons. Her owners sold her in 1803 and her subsequent deployment and fate is currently unknown.

== Career ==
EIC voyage #1 (1788–1789): Captain Joseph Elliott sailed from Portsmouth on 5 April 1788, bound for Madras and China. Boddam reached Madras on 19 July, and arrived at Whampoa Anchorage on 1 October. Homeward bound, she crossed the Second Bar on 17 December. She reached St Helena on 14 April 1789 and arrived at Long Reach on 12 June.

EIC voyage #2 (1791–1792): Captain John Jones sailed from The Downs on 25 February 1791, bound for Madras and China. That day she narrowly escaped being wrecked on the Casket Rocks. Boddam reached Madras on 15 June and arrived at Whampoa on 13 September. Homeward bound, she crossed the Second Bar on 13 November, reached St Helena on 27 February 1792, and arrived at Long Reach on 24 April.

EIC voyage #3 (1794–1795): Following the outbreak of war with France in March 1793 Captain John Jones acquired a letter of marque on 26 November 1793.

The British government held her at Portsmouth, together with a number of other Indiamen in anticipation of using them as transports for an attack on Île de France (Mauritius). It gave up the plan and released the vessels in May 1794. It paid £1,479 3s 4d for having delayed her departure by 71 days.

Captain Jones sailed from Portsmouth on 2 May 1794, bound for Madras and China. Boddam was at Rio de Janeiro on 4 July, and reached Madras on 7 September. She was at Penang on 5 October and Malacca on 15 October, and arrived at Whampoa on 31 January 1795. Homeward bound, Boddam crossed the Second Bar on 5 March, and reached Malacca again on 26 April. She was at St Helena on 24 August. On 3 September she sailed from St Helena. She sailed together with Indian Trader, Rockingham, and Latona, and a number of other vessels, all under the escort of HMS Hector. Boddam arrived back at Long Reach on 28 November.

EIC voyage #4 (1796–1798): Captain George Palmer (later MP for South Essex) acquired a letter of marque on 18 March 1796. He sailed from Portsmouth on 17 May 1796, bound for St Helena, Madras, and China. (Note: Palmer had been fourth officer on her second voyage, and second officer on her third voyage.) Boddam was at St Helena on 21 July and reached Madras on 1 October. From there she sailed to Colombo, which she reached on 30 November. Alfred and Canton were already there when Boddam arrived. They waited until Ocean, Taunton Castle, and Woodford arrived by 9 December.

They then set out together for Canton with Captain James Farquharson, the senior captain, as commodore of the fleet.

On 28 January 1797 the Indiamen had sailed through the Bali Strait in a squall and were off Java when they encountered six French frigates. Farquharson proceeded to organize a bluff. To give the impression that the convoy consisted of the powerful ships of the line that the Indiamen resembled, Farquharson ordered his ships to advance in line of battle. The French retreated, convinced they were facing a superior force. Actually, the French outgunned the East Indiamen both in terms of the number of guns and the weight of shot per gun.

The Indiamen sailed east and then up towards China. On 1 February the Fleet encountered a strong gale with violent squalls and rain. Boddam almost wrecked on the Scheidam Rocks; the storm did wreck Ocean.

Boddam arrived at Whampoa on 8 April 1797. Homeward bound, she crossed the Second Bar on 11 May.

On 19 June, while Boddam and several other vessels were still in the China Sea, a violent typhoon cost her her rudder and everyone of her masts. She turned back to China, which she reached on 29 June, but not before enduring three hurricanes and other dangers. After having been dismasted and having lost her rudder, Boddam jury-rigged replacements. As she approached the Pearl River, the pilot saw that another typhoon was approaching and guided her into Tong-Huo Cove, on Tong-Hou Island. (Note: Now Dong'ao Island (22°01′19″N 113°42′18″E). The cove is on the north-east of the island and was known to Westerners for some time thereafter as "Boddam Cove".) There she rode out the weather.

On 24 July Boddam was at Macao, and on 28 August she was again at Whampoa. Again homeward bound, she crossed the Second Bar on 16 December and was at Malacca on 17 January 1798. By 18 March she was at the Cape and by 15 April she was at St Helena. After the Fleet left St Helena it succeeded in capturing the Spanish vessel San Jacinto. (Note: Prize money was paid in May 1813. A petty officer's share was worth 11s 6d, and a seaman's share was worth 3s 6d.) On 25 June Boddam was at Cork, and The Downs on 7 July. While she was there, an officer from Alfred came on board and pressed 18 seamen. He was courteous enough to leave 18 seamen from Alfred on board in their stead until Palmer could recruit replacements to help him bring Boddam up the Thames. She arrived at Long Reach on 12 July.

EIC voyage #5 (1799–1800): Captain Palmer sailed from Portsmouth on 2 April 1799, bound for Madras and China. Boddam reached Madras on 9 August. She was at Penang on 2 September and Malacca on 14 September. On 22 October Boddam again encountered a typhoon in the China Sea. Though she herself was unharmed, she was able to assist the country ship Friendship, Captain Dawson, to make it into port. Palmer declined any salvage or reward, but Friendship's owner gave him an engraved silver tureen. Boddam arrived at Whampoa on 30 October. Homeward bound, she crossed the Second Bar on 25 December, reached Malacca on 18 January 1800 and St Helena on 11 April, and then arrived at Long Reach on 28 June. Captain Palmer then retired from the sea on doctor's orders.

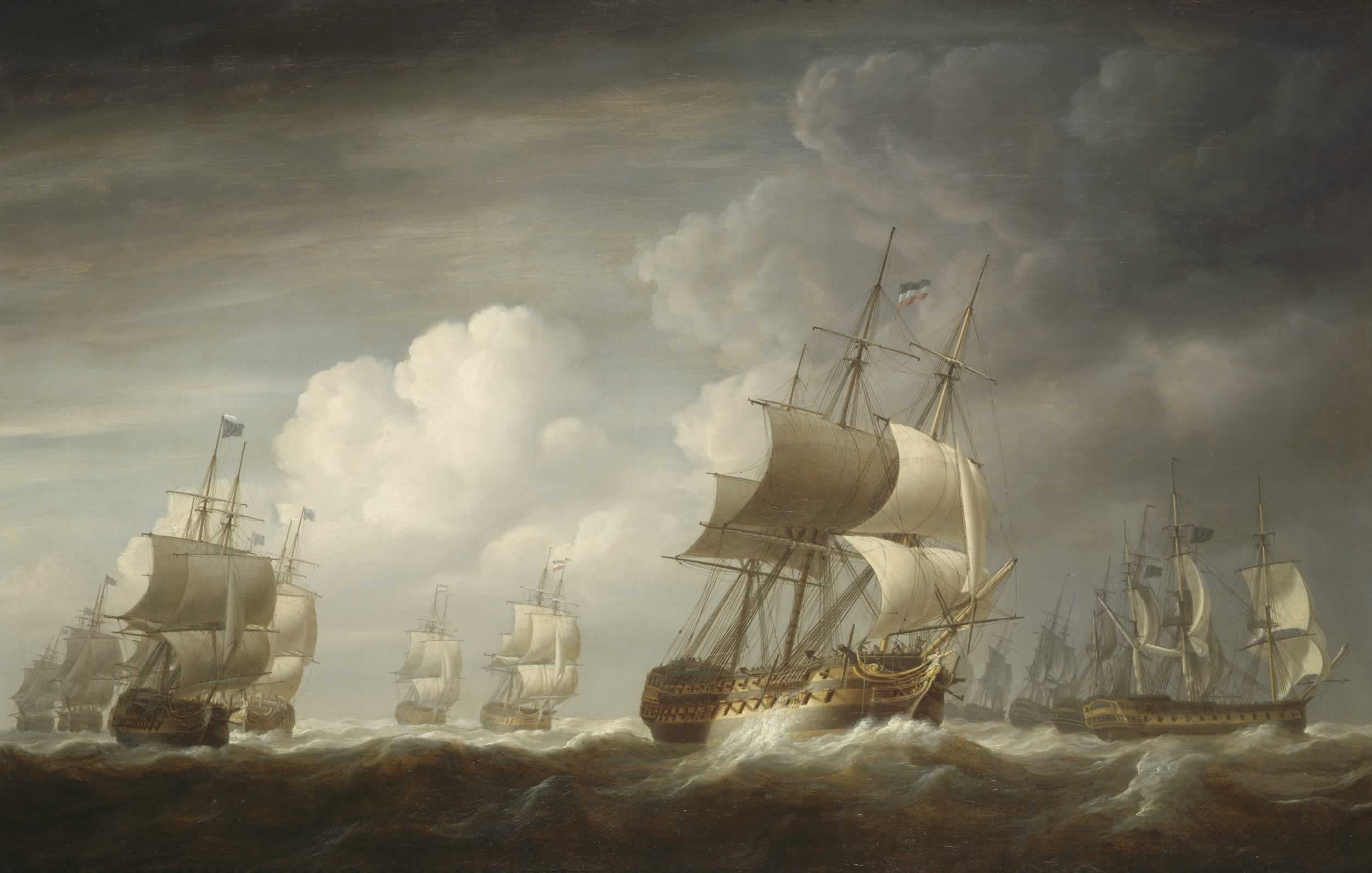
A fleet of East Indiamen at Sea, by Nicholas Pocock; it is believed to show the Indiamen Lord Hawkesbury, Worcester, Boddam, Fort William, Airly Castle, Lord Duncan, Ocean, Henry Addington, Carnatic, Hope, and Windham returning from China in 1802

EIC voyage #6 (1801–1802): Captain John Jones acquired a letter of marque on 18 February 1801. He sailed from Portsmouth on 31 March 1801, bound for Madras and China. Boddam reached Madras on 26 July. She was at Penang on 28 August and Malacca on 10 September, before arriving at Whampoa on 28 September. Homeward bound, she crossed the Second Bar on 16 December. She reached St Helena on 13 April, and then arrived at Long Reach on 12 June.

== Fate ==
When Boddham returned from her last voyage the EIC viewed her as worn-out. In 1803 Palmer offered Boddam for sale as a hulk. However the British Government took her up as a troopship. Currently there is no readily available information about how long she served in that capacity or her final disposition.
