= Albion (1787 EIC ship) =

History

British East India Company
- Name: Albion
- Namesake: Albion
- Owner: EIC voyages #1-6: Richard Lewin; EIC voyages #7&8: Andrew Timbrell
- Builder: Perry, Blackwall
- Launched: 27 October 1787
- Fate: Lost 1816

General characteristics
- Tons burthen: 961, or 96166/94 (bm)
- Length: 153 ft 11 in (46.9 m) (overall); 125 ft 0 in (38.1 m) (keel)
- Beam: 38 ft 0 in (11.6 m)
- Depth of hold: 15 ft 7 in (4.7 m)
- Propulsion: Sail
- Complement: 1793:80; 1794:80; 1796:100; 1800:116; Or:116-140
- Armament: 1793:26 × 9&4-pounder guns; 1794:26 × 9&4-pounder guns; 1796:26 × 9&4-pounder guns; 1800:26 × 9&18-pounder guns
- Notes: Three decks

Albion was an East Indiaman of the British East India Company (EIC). She made eight voyages for the EIC before she was sold to the British government in 1810 for service as a troopship. She was lost at sea in 1816.

== EIC voyages ==
=== EIC voyage #1 (1788-1789) ===
Captain Thomas Allen sailed from the Downs on 26 March 1788, bound for Madras and China. Albion reached Madras on 29 July and Whampoa on 8 October. Homeward-bound, she crossed the Second Bar on 9 January 1789, reached St Helena on 24 April, and arrived at Blackwall on 2 July.

=== EIC voyage #2 (1790-1792) ===
Captain William Parker left Blackwall on 23 October 1790, bound for Madras and China. However, Albion did not leave Torbay until 23 January 1791; she arrived at Madras on 28 May. She then reached Penang on 12 July, and arrived at Whampoa on 27 August. Homeward-bound, she crossed the Second Bar on 22 October, reached St Helena on 29 February 1792, and arrived at Blackwall on 25 May.

=== EIC voyage #3 (1794-1795) ===
Without original research, it is not clear how command of Albion evolved on the start of her third voyage. War with France had broken out. As was standard operating procedure for EIC vessels, the captains received letters of marque. Captain John Barklay acquired a letter of marque on 21 December 1793, after she had left Blackwall on 14 November. Captain William Wells, jnr., acquired a letter of marque on 6 January 1794.

The British government held her at Portsmouth, together with a number of other Indiamen in anticipation of using them as transports for an attack on Île de France (Mauritius). It gave up the plan and released the vessels in May 1794. It paid £1,479 3s 4d for having delayed her departure by 71 days.

Albion left Portsmouth on 2 May, bound for Bombay and China, and reached Bombay on 4 September. On 11 December she was at Bantam, and she reached Whampoa on 26 February 1794. Homeward bound, she crossed the Second Bar on 19 April, reached Batavia on 6 August and St Helena on 16 October, before arriving at Blackwall on 22 January 1795.

=== EIC voyage #4 1796-1798) ===
Captain Andrew Timbrell sailed Albion on her next three voyages. He received a letter of marque on 6 June 1796.

He sailed from Portsmouth on 11 August 1796, bound for Bombay and China. Albion reached the Cape on 18 November. From there she took a somewhat circuitous route, stopping at Colombo on 14 February 1797, then Cochin on 24 February, and Tellicherry on 28 February. She finally arrived at Bombay on 16 March. She returned to Telliherry on 30 April, and Bombay on 25 May. She reached Madras on 11 August, Penang on 5 September, Malacca on 15 October, and Whampoa on 20 December. Homeward-bound, she crossed the Second Bar on 27 February 1788, reached Macao on 27 March and St Helena on 5 August, and arrived at Blackwall on 8 November.

=== EIC voyage #5 (1799-1800) ===
Timbrell sailed from Portsmouth on 18 June 1799, bound for Bombay. Albion was at Rio de Janeiro on 14 August and Tellicherry on 25 November, before arriving at Bombay on 6 December. She sailed form Bombay on 23 January 1800 in company with Woodford to gather pepper on the Malabar Coast prior to returning to England. They sailed to Anjengo, which Albion reached on 2 February 1800. She sailed to Quillon, which she reached on 5 February. Albion and Woodford returned to Anjengo on 15 February. They reached St Helena on 15 May, and Albion arrived at Long Reach on 6 August.

=== EIC voyage #6 (1801-1802) ===
Timbrell left Portsmouth on 19 May 1801 and reached Rio de Janeiro on 1 August. From there Albion reached Penang on 31 October and Malacca on 25 November, arriving at Whampoa on 30 January 1802. Homeward-bound, she crossed the Second Bar on 8 March, reached St Helena on 10 July, and arrived at Deptford on 27 September.

It is not clear whether Albion sailed between 1803 and 1804. She is carried in a list of EIC ships in the Register of Shipping as being "At home" as of 6 December 1804.

=== EIC voyage #7 (1805-1808) ===
Captain Benjamin Richardson received a letter of marque on 16 August 1805. He sailed Albion from Portsmouth on 27 September, bound for Madras, Bengal, and China. She reached São Tiago on 21 October, Madras on 11 February 1806, and Masulipatam on 13 March. She arrived at Kedgeree on 23 March. On her way to China, she passed Saugor on 6 May, and reached Penang on 12 June. She returned to Saugor on 6 May, and Penang on 22 November. The British Royal Navy frigate HMS Caroline, Captain Peter Rainier, escorted Albion and Perseverance through the Gillolo Passage between Halmahera and Waigeo. (Caroline then left them and on 27 December captured the Spanish ship St Raphael (alias Pallas), in a single-ship action. (Note: St Raphael belonged to the Royal Company of the Philippines. She was armed with 26 guns and had a crew of 97 men under the command of Don Juan Baptista Montaverde. She did not strike her colours until she had lost 27 men killed and wounded. (British casualties were one dead and six wounded.) She had sailed from Lima on 12 November, bound for Manila. She proved to be a valuable prize as she had on board 500,000 Spanish dollars in specie, 1700 quintals of copper, and other valuable cargo.)) Albion arrived at Whampoa on 13 March. Homeward-bound, she crossed the Second Bar on 13 March, reached Lintin Island on 3 May, Penang on 1 July, the Cape on 19 September, and St Helena on 13 October, and arrived at Long Reach on 2 January 1808.

=== EIC voyage #8 (1809-1810) ===
Richardson sailed Albion from Portsmouth on 5 April 1809, bound for China. She reached Penang on 27 July and the Second Bar on 8 October, before arriving at Whampoa on 4 November. Homeward bound, she crossed the Second Bar on 22 September, reached St Helena on 22 May 1810, and arrived at Gravesend on 1 August.

== Fate ==
In 1810 Andrew Timbrell sold Albion to the Government for use as a troopship. She was lost at sea in 1816.
