= Taunton Castle (1790 EIC ship) =

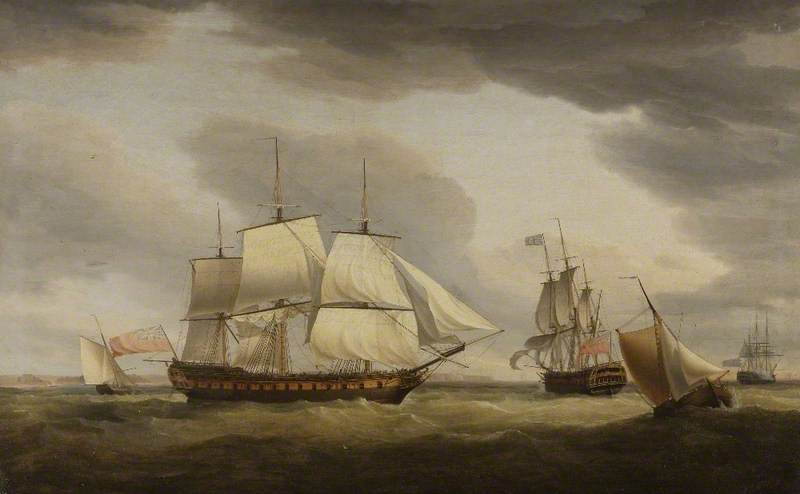
- 1791 painting of Taunton Castle (second from left)

History

United Kingdom
- Name: Taunton Castle
- Namesake: Taunton Castle
- Owner: EIC voyages 1-6: Peter Esdaile (Note: Peter Esdaile was the managing owner. The other owners were Sir Benjamin Hammet, Edward Jeffries, Sir James Peter, and William Esdaile, plus one or two others.); EIC voyages:7-9 Andrew Timbrell
- Builder: William Barnard, Deptford,
- Launched: 23 October 1790
- Fate: Sold 1803

General characteristics
- Tons burthen: 1209, or 120993/94, or 1246 (bm)
- Length: Overall: 165 ft 5 in (50.4 m); Keel: 134 ft 2 3/4 in (40.9 m)
- Beam: 41 ft 2 in (12.5 m)
- Depth of hold: 17 ft 1 in (5.2 m)
- Sail plan: Full-rigged ship
- Complement: 1794:155; 1798:120; 1801:130; 1804:140; 1807:135; 1811:130
- Armament: 1794:36 × 12&4-pounder guns; 1798:26 × 12&6-pounder guns; 1801:26 × 12&6-pounder guns; 1804:26 × 6&12-pounder guns; 1807:32 × 12&18-pounder guns + 2 swivel guns; 1811:32 × 12&18-pounder guns + 3 swivel guns
- Notes: Three decks

Taunton Castle was launched on the River Thames in 1790 as an East Indiaman. She made nine voyages for the British East India Company (EIC) before she was broken up in 1813. In 1797, on her third trip, she was one of a fleet of six East Indiamen that bluffed a squadron of six French frigates into fleeing.

== Career ==
=== EIC voyage #1 (1791–1792) ===
Captain James Urmston sailed from The Downs on 24 January 1791, bound for Bombay and China. Taunton Castle reached Bombay on 20 May. She left around 1 August and arrived at Whampoa Anchorage on 28 September. Homeward bound, she crossed the Second Bar on 1 January 1792. She stopped at Batavia on 19 January. She reached St Helena on 6 April, leaving on the 28th, and arrived at The Downs on 21 June.

=== EIC voyage #2 (1794–1795) ===
Between Taunton Castle's first and second voyages Napoleonic Wars war with France had resumed. Captain Edward Studd acquired a letter of marque on 10 April 1794.

The British government held Raymond at Portsmouth, together with a number of other Indiamen in anticipation of using them as transports for an attack on Île de France (Mauritius). It gave up the plan and released the vessels in May 1794. It paid £456 17s 6d for having delayed her departure by 17 days.

Captain Studd sailed from Portsmouth on 2 May, bound for China. Taunton Castle reached Whampoa on 3 October. Homeward bound, she crossed the Second Bar on 7 December, reached St Helena on 13 April 1795, and arrived at The Downs on 22 July.

=== EIC voyage #3 (1796–1798) ===
Captain Studd sailed from Portsmouth on 12 April 1796, bound for Bombay and China. Taunton Castle was at Rio de Janeiro on 28 June and reached Bombay on 29 August. She then stopped at Colombo on 9 December.

Alfred, Canton, and Boddam were already there when Taunton Castle arrived. Ocean and Woodford also arrived by 9 December. They then set out together for Canton with Captain James Farquharson, of Alfred, the senior captain, as commodore of the fleet.

On 28 January 1797 the Indiamen had sailed through the Bali Strait in a squall and were off Java when they encountered six French frigates. Farquharson proceeded to organize a bluff. To give the impression that the convoy consisted of the powerful ships of the line that the Indiamen resembled, Farquharson ordered his ships to advance in line of battle. The French retreated, convinced they were facing a superior force. Actually, the French outgunned the East Indiamen both in terms of the number of guns and the weight of shot per gun.

The Indiamen sailed east and then up towards China. On 1 February the Fleet encountered a strong gale with violent squalls and rain; the storm did wreck Ocean.

Taunton Castle arrived at Whampoa on 8 April; Alfred, Boddam, Canton, and Woodford also arrived at about the same time.

Homeward bound, Taunton Castle crossed the Second Bar on 4 June. On the homeward voyage from China, a storm damaged Taunton Castle and forced her to stop at Ambonya. There she embarked the survivors from Ocean. Taunton Castle reached the Cape on 20 October and St Helena on 4 December. She arrived at Yarmouth on 7 February 1798, in a disabled state. The EIC thanked Farquharson and awarded him 500 guineas.

=== EIC voyage #4 (1798–1800) ===
Captain Essex Henry Bond acquired a letter of marque on 18 October 1798. He sailed from Portsmouth on 31 December, bound for Bombay and China. Taunton Castle and Carnatic reached the Cape of Good Hope on 25/26 March 1799. They were transporting the 88th Regiment of Foot on to Bombay. Taunton Castle left the Cape on 12 April and arrived at and Bombay on 10 June. She reached Malacca on 19 September and arrived at Whampoa on 2 October. Homeward bound, she crossed the Second Bar on 28 December, reached St Helena on 22 April 1800, and arrived at The Downs on 25 June.

=== EIC voyage #5 (1801-1802) ===
Capt Thomas Burston Pierce acquired a letter of marque on 27 February 1801. He sailed from Portsmouth on 19 May 1801, bound for China. Taunton Castle was at Rio de Janeiro on 1 August and Penang on 31 October. She arrived at Whampoa on 31 January 1802. Homeward bound, she crossed the Second Bar on 30 March, reached St Helena on 10 July, and arrived at The Downs on 16 September.

=== EIC voyage #6 (1804–1805) ===
War with France had resumed and Captain Pierce acquired a letter of marque on 20 April 1804. He sailed from Portsmouth on 9 June 1804, bound for China. She was part of a convoy of nine Indiamen, all bound for China: Perseverance, Neptune, Arniston, Ceres, Royal Charlotte, Alnwick Castle, True Briton, and Cuffnells. HMS Athenienne provided the escort.

The fleet arrived at Rio de Janeiro around 14–18 August; Taunton Castle arrived on 18 August. The fleet left Rio on 1 September and later passed the Cape of Good Hope. To avoid French ships reported to be in the Indian Ocean, the fleet sailed towards Western Australia, rather than to the Straits of Malacca.

Taunton Castle separated in the South Atlantic. She was at Amsterdam Island on 13 October.

The fleet sailed to Norfolk Island via Bass Strait; (Note: The fleet also had the objective to improve the charting of Bass Strait.) Norfolk Island was the next rendezvous point after Saint Paul Island, for members that had separated.

Taunton Castle transited Bass Strait on 4 November, and arrived at Norfolk Island on 13 November, three days after the fleet had sailed on. Taunton Castle did not rejoin the rest of the fleet until she arrived at Haerlem Bay, in China. She arrived at Whampoa on 23 January 1805.

Homeward bound, she crossed the Second Bar on 5 March, reached Malacca on 21 March and St Helena 30 June, and arrived at The Downs on 12 September.

=== EIC voyage #7 (1807–1808) ===
Captain James Timbrell acquired a letter of marque on 7 March 1807. He sailed from Portsmouth on 18 April, bound for China. Taunton Castle reached Penang on 14 September and arrived at Whampoa on 28 December. Homeward bound, she crossed the Second Bar on 9 March 1808, reached Penang on 4 April and St Helena on 10 July. she arrived at The downs on 12 September.

=== EIC voyage #8 (1809–1810) ===
Captain Timbrell sailed from Portsmouth on 28 April 1809, bound for Bombay. Taunton Castle arrived there on 12 September. Homeward bound, she was at Rodrigues on 20 November. She reached St Helena on 7 January 1810, sailed from there on the 14th, and arrived at The Downs on 23 March.

=== EIC voyage #9 (1811–1812) ===
Captain Benjamin Richardson acquired a letter of marque on 17 January 1811. (9) 1810/1 Madras and China. Captain Richardson sailed from Portsmouth on 12 March 1811, bound for Madras and China. Taunton Castle reached Madras on 28 July. She was at Penang on 17 September and Malacca on 31 October, before arriving at Whampoa on 4 December. Homeward bound, she crossed the Second Bar on 4 March 1812, reached St Helena on 28 May, and arrived at The Downs on 22 July.

== Fate ==
When Taunton Castle returned from her last voyage the EIC declared her worn-out. On 10 June 1813 her registration was cancelled as demolition was complete.

== Post-script ==
In May 1817 the EIC offered for sale goods that had been sold some years before but never collected. Among the lots were several lots of mother-of-pearl that Taunton Castle had brought and that had originally been sold in September 1812.
