= Princess Amelia (1808 EIC ship) =

History

East India Company
- Name: Princess Amelia
- Owner: Robert Williams
- Operator: British East India Company
- Builder: Frances Barnard, Son & Roberts,
- Launched: 19 November 1808
- Fate: Broken up 1827

General characteristics
- Tons burthen: 1273, or 1275, or 127554/94, or 1359 (bm)
- Length: Overall: 166 ft 5 1/2 in (50.7 m); Keel: 134 ft 6 1/2 in (41.0 m)
- Beam: 42 ft 2 in (12.9 m)
- Depth of hold: 17 ft 1 in (5.2 m)
- Complement: 1809: 135; 1820: 150
- Armament: 1809: 38 × 18&12-pounder guns; 1820: 26 guns

Princess Amelia was launched in 1808 on the Thames as an East Indiaman. She made ten voyages for the British East India Company (EIC). The first six were as a "regular" ship; the next four represented single voyages contracted for by the EIC. On several of these voyages Princess Amelia brought to England Chinese sailors, or carried them back to China after they had become stranded in London at the end of EIC vessels' arrival back in England. On her fifth voyage Princess Amelia repatriated 380 Chinese sailors. She was broken up in 1827.

== Career ==
=== Rules or regulations pertaining to Chinese sailors ===
The Chinese government forbade Chinese from serving on foreign vessels. At Bocca Tigris, two Chinese officials (tidewaiters), would board vessels going up to Canton, and would stay with the vessel until she passed the Bocca Tigris on her homeward-bound journey, when they would alight, to await the arrival of the next vessel. Consequently, the captains seeking to employ Chinese sailors would generally embark them in the Pearl River delta, after passing the Bocca Tigris.

The EIC permitted its captains to employ Chinese sailors, but after 1805, only for the homeward journey. Chinese sailors were then to be discharged on their arrival in England, with the cost of their repatriation being charged to the vessel.

When an EIC vessel carrying sailors being repatriated arrived in the Pearl River delta, it would disembark the sailors prior to arriving at the Bocca Tigris.

=== 1st EIC voyage (1809–1810) ===
Captain Edward Balston acquired a letter of marque on 22 March 1809. He sailed from Portsmouth on 5 April, bound for China. Princess Amelia reached Penang on 23 July, and 6 November arrived at Whampoa Anchorage. Homeward bound, she crossed the Second Bar on 22 December.

On 5 March 1810, she embarked 25 Chinese sailors to build out her crew. Two men died en route.

Princess Amelia reached St Helena on 21 May 1810, and arrived at the Downs. She discharged her surviving Chinese sailors in London.

=== 2nd EIC voyage (1811–1812) ===
On 4 December 1810, Princess Amelia took on board 31 Chinese passengers. Fifteen had come on Princess Amelia. The rest had come on seven other EIC vessels. One man died at sea. The rest were laded in China on 28 December 1812.

Captain Balston sailed from Portsmouth on 12 March 1811, bound for Madras. Princess Amelia reached Madras on 27 July, Penang on 18 September, and Malacca on 28 October. She arrived at Whampoa on 3 January 1812. One of the Chinese passengers had died at sea. The rest were laded in China on 28 December 1812.

Homeward bound, she crossed the Second Bar on 10 February. She embarked 35 sailors before she left Macao on 4 March 1812. She reached St Helena on 23 May, and arrived at the Downs on 23 July.

=== 3rd EIC voyage (1813–1814) ===
On 28 November 1812, at Gravesend, Princess Amelia took on board 64 Chinese sailors as passengers. The EIC Court of Directors had ordered their repatriation.

Captain Balston sailed from Portsmouth on 29 January 1813, bound for China. Princess Amelia reached the Cape on 7 May and Penang on 11 July. At Penang, 22 of the Chinese sailors left the ship.

Princess Amelia was at Malacca on 9 September and arrived at Whampoa on 25 October. In the Pearl River Delta, i.e., before reaching Whampoa, the remaining 42 Chinese sailors left her.

Homeward bound, she crossed the Second Bar on 23 December. At Lintin Island she took on 36 Chinese sailors as crew. She reached Macao on 21 February 1814 and St Helena on 26 May, and arrived at the Downs on 10 August. On 20 August the Chinese sailors were landed at Long Reach. They received their wages on 22 September.

=== 4th EIC voyage (1815–1816) ===
Captain Balston sailed from Portsmouth on 7 April on 1815, bound for China. On this voyage she carried 15 Chinese passengers.

Princess Amelia arrived at Whampoa on 11 September. Homeward bound, she crossed the Second Bar. On 8 December, while anchored at the Ladrone Islands, she took on 36 Chinese sailors. Princess Amelia reached St Helena on 3 March 1816, and arrived at the Downs on 2 May. She discharged the Chinese sailors on 14 May at Blackwall, where they were paid their wages for five months and six days on the ship.

=== 5th EIC voyage (1816–1817) ===
On this voyage Princess Amelia carried 380 Chinese sailors who had been released from their vessels in London and hadn't found passage home. She had been hired to carry them direct to China.

On 15 June 1816, thirty-six Chinese seamen came aboard. These were the Chinese sailors she had brought on her fourth voyage. Then on 11 July, another 344 Chinese sailors, who had come from other EIC ships, boarded. Captain Balston sailed from the Downs on 20 July 1816, bound for China.

Princess Amelia discharged 154 of the seamen she was carrying on 30 November at Bali. She would then sail via the Alas Strait for Canton and sailors wanting to go to Manila would have preferred to disembark at Bali than to proceed to Canton to look there for passage to Manila. She arrived at Lintin Island on 2 February 1817, where she disembarked the remaining 225 sailors, one having died en route.

Princess Amelia arrived at Whampoa on 5 February 1817. Homeward bound, she crossed the Second Bar on 25 February, reached St Helena on 5 June, and arrived at the Downs on 26 July.

=== 6th EIC voyage (1818–1819) ===
Captain Balston sailed from the Downs on 9 February 1818, bound for Madras and China. Princess Amelia reached Madras on 3 June and Penang on 2 August. She arrived at Whampoa on 1 October. Homeward bound, she crossed the Second Bar on 25 November, reached St Helena on 3 March, and arrived in Long Reach on 4 May.

=== 7th EIC voyage (1820–1821) ===
On 1 September the EIC accepted a tender from Robert William for Princess Amelia for one voyage at £23 per ton for 1273 tons. Captain Nathaniel Turner sailed from the Downs 25 April 1820, bound for China. Princess Amelia arrived at Whampoa on 29 August. Homeward bound, she crossed the Second Bar on 11 December, reached St Helena on 14 April 1821, and arrived at the Downs on 8 May.

=== 8th EIC voyage (1821–1822) ===
On 16 January 1822, the EIC accepted a tender from Robert William for Princess Amelia for one voyage at £14 10s per ton for 1342 tons. Captain Thomas Williams sailed from the Downs on 1 May 1822. She arrived at Whampoa on 13 September. Homeward bound, she crossed the Second Bar on 31 October, reached St Helena on 16 February 1823, and arrived back at the Downs on 17 April.

=== 9th EIC voyage (1824–1825) ===
On 3 September 1823, the EIC accepted a tender from Robert William for Princess Amelia for one voyage at £16 10s per ton for 1200 tons. Captain Thomas Williams sailed from the Downs on 24 April 1824, bound for China. She arrived at Whampoa on 9 September. Homeward bound, she was at Tiger Island on 16 January 1825, reached St Helena on 5 April, and arrived back at the Downs on 25 May.

=== 10th EIC voyage (1826–1827) ===
On 5 May 1826, the EIC accepted a tender from Robert William for Princess Amelia for one voyage at £14 15s per ton for 13420 tons. Captain James Kellaway sailed from the Downs on 16 July 1826, bound for China. She arrived at Whampoa on 10 December. Homeward bound, she crossed the Second Bar on 25 January 1827, reached St Helena on 12 April, and arrived back at the Downs on 24 Downs.

== Fate ==
Princess Amelia was sold in 1827 for breaking up.
