= HMS Athenienne (1800) =

Ship of the line of the Royal Navy

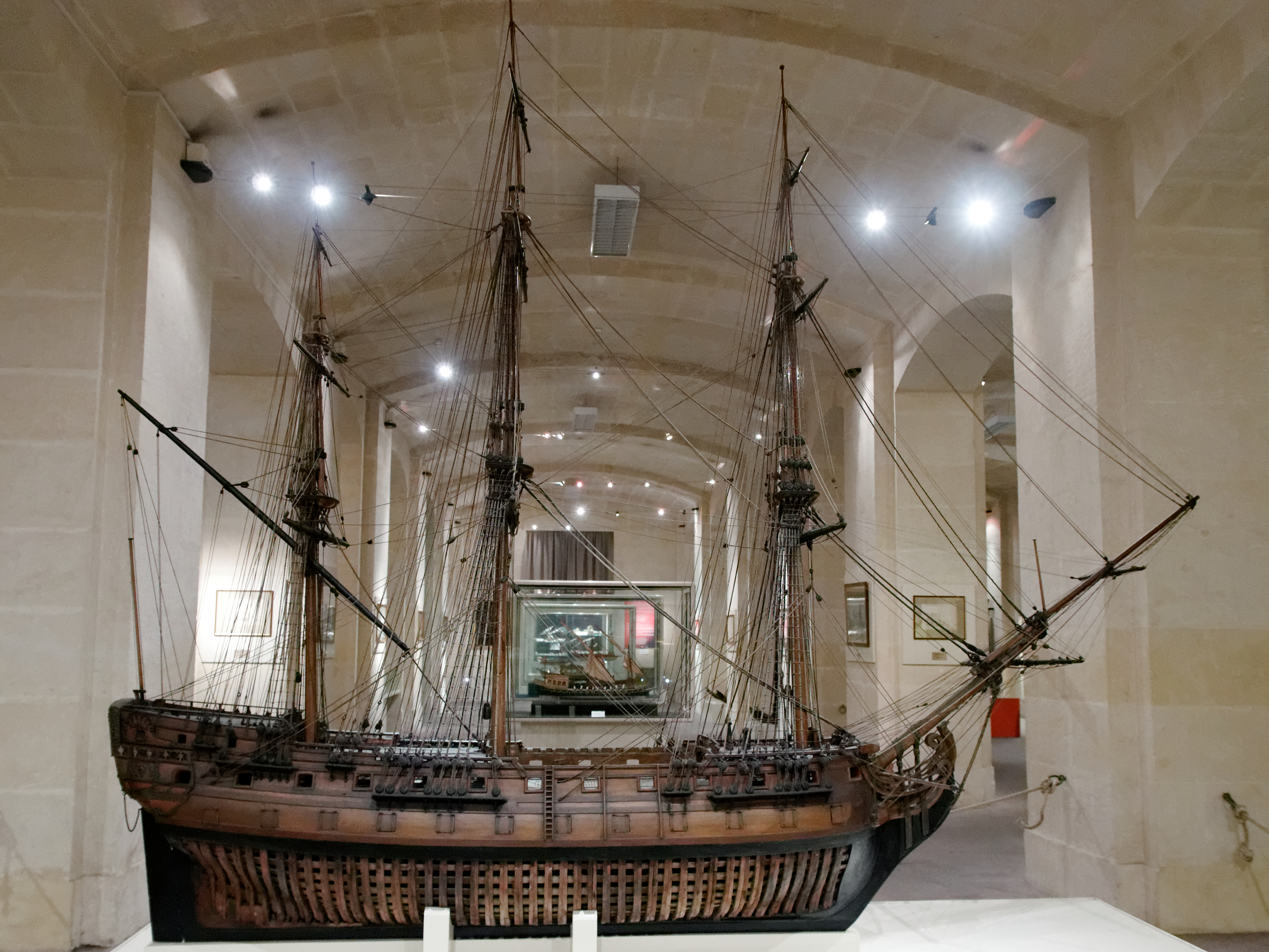
- Model of a Maltese ship of the line, similar to San Giovanni, at the Malta Maritime Museum

History

Malta
- Name: San Giovanni
- Namesake: Saint John
- Builder: La Valette
- Laid down: 1796
- Captured: 11 June 1798 by the French Navy

France
- Name: Athénien
- Namesake: Athens
- Launched: October 1798
- In service: December 1799
- Captured: 4 September 1800, by Royal Navy

Great Britain
- Name: Athenienne
- Acquired: 4 September 1800
- Fate: Wrecked 20 October 1806

General characteristics
- Tons burthen: 141189/94 (bm)
- Length: 163 ft 3 in (49.8 m) (overall); 132 ft 0 in (40.2 m) (keel)
- Beam: 44 ft 9 in (13.6 m)
- Depth of hold: 19 ft 8 in (6.0 m)
- Sail plan: Full-rigged ship
- Complement: 491
- Armament: Lower deck:26 × 24-pounder guns; Upper deck:26 × 18-pounder guns; QD:2 × 9-pounder guns + 8 × 24-pounder carronades; Fc:2 × 9-pounder guns + 4 × 24-pounder carronades

HMS Athenienne was a 64-gun third-rate ship of the line of the Royal Navy. She was originally the Maltese Navy ship San Giovanni, which the French captured on the stocks in 1798 and launched and commissioned as the French Navy ship Athénien. British forces captured her at Valletta on 4 September 1800 during the siege of Malta and took her into service as Athenienne. She was wrecked near Sicily with great loss of life in 1806.

== French career ==
The Knights of Malta were constructing San Giovanni for their navy at her building site in Valletta when the French occupied Malta. She was launched four months later, and the French took her into service as Athénien. They appointed her to the medical services of the fleet, and in that capacity carried out research on the diseases affecting the French fleet in the Mediterranean.

The British acquired Athénien in connection with the capture of Malta. Although the capitulation only took place in September, Athenian was among the British vessels at Malta that shared in the prize money for the capture of Courageux on 29 March 1800. (Note: Courageux may have been a brigantine of ten 4-pounder guns that the French navy acquired at Toulon in April 1798. She was struck at Toulon in 1800, but that may have occurred after her capture at Malta on 29 March 1800.)

The Royal Navy brought Athénien into British service as HMS Athenienne.

== British career ==
In December 1800, Sir Thomas Livingstone assumed command of Athenienne. He then accompanied Rear Admiral Sir John Borlase Warren to the coast of Egypt in search of a French squadron under Admiral Ganteaume, which was east of Sardinia. The French squadron escaped.

Athenienne then joined the squadron under Lord Keith off Alexandria until she sprang a leak and returned to Malta for repairs. In 1850, the Admiralty awarded the Naval General Service Medal with clasp "Egypt" to claimants from the crews of the vessels that had served in the navy's Egyptian campaign between 8 March 1801 and 2 September, including Athenian.

Thereafter she was sent to cruise the island of Elba until the Peace of Amiens led to her to being recalled.

Athenian left Gibraltar on 25 August 1802, arrived in Portsmouth on 11 September, and was placed in quarantine. On 24 September she sailed into Portsmouth to be paid off. Her officers and crew were paid off at Portsmouth in October 1802.

Athenienne underwent fitting at Portsmouth between January and March 1804. Captain Francis Fayerman commissioned her there.

=== Voyage to China (1804-1805) ===
On 9 June 1804, Athenienne, left St. Helens, Isle of Wight, as escort to nine East Indiamen of the British East India Company bound for China. The Indiamen were Perseverance, Neptune, Taunton Castle, Ceres, Royal Charlotte, Alnwick Castle, True Briton, Arniston, and Cuffnells.

The fleet arrived at Rio de Janeiro around 14–18 August. It then passed the Cape of Good Hope. From here, rather than passing through the Indian Ocean and the Straits of Malacca, the fleet sailed south of Western Australia and through Bass Strait. The objectives were two-fold: to avoid French ships reported to be in the Indian Ocean, and to improve the charting of Bass Strait.

The ships then sailed to Norfolk Island, which was the next rendezvous point after Saint Paul Island, for members that had separated. Taunton Castle had separated in the South Atlantic and although she arrived at Norfolk Island three days after the fleet had sailed on, did not rejoin the rest of the fleet until she arrived at Haerlem Bay, in China.

The arrival of the Athenienne and the East Indiamen at Norfolk Island sowed panic among the colonists there who feared that a French flotilla had arrived.

The fleet arrived at Whampoa in mid-January 1805. The fleet then returned to England via the Straits of Malacca. Arniston, for example, crossed the Second Bar on 14 February, reached Malacca on 21 March and St Helena on 30 June, and arrived at Long Reach on 15 September.

=== Subsequent service ===
In October 1805 Captain John Giffard replaced Fayerman. He sailed Athenienne to Gibraltar with stores and supplies for the fleet after the Battle of Trafalgar. On 21 April 1806 Sir Sidney Smith took command off Palermo of a squadron that included Athenienne. She subsequently took part in the reinforcement of the defense of Gaieta (41°13′N 13°34′E), the capture of Capri, and frequent forays to the coast of Calabria.

In the capture of Capri on 12 May Athenien's marines landed and captured the heights, which forced the French to surrender.

In August 1806 Athenienne was in the Mediterranean under Captain Edward Fellowes.

== Fate ==
On 16 October 1806, Athenienne sailed from Gibraltar for Malta under the command of Captain Robert Raynsford, with a crew of 470. In the evening of 20 October, she ran aground on a submerged reef, the Esquirques (37°47′N 10°46′E), in the Strait of Sicily.

The crew cut away ship's masts to prevent her rolling on her side, but nevertheless she flooded to the lower deck ports within half an hour, then rolled over. Captain Raynsford had had an improvised raft constructed. Unfortunately, two of the ship's boats were swamped when launching and two others deserted the wreck; after much trouble the ship's launch was freed and got into the water. Over 100 survivors were crammed into her and she was rescued the following day by a Danish ship, who brought them safely to land. In all, 347 people died, including Captain Raynsford, while 141 men and 2 women were rescued. (Note: One account gives the number of people rescued as 123, rather than 143. Another states that there were 475 people aboard, of whom 122 were saved in her boats, and 2 on a raft. So in all 353 died and 124 were saved.)

== See also ==
- List of ships captured in the 19th century
