= List of ship launches in 1802 =

The list of ship launches in 1802 includes a chronological list of some ships launched in 1802.

Date	Ship	Class	Builder	Location	Country	Notes
26 January	Clyde	Merchantman	John Gilmore & Co.	Calcutta	India	For private owner.
6 February	Wanstead	Merchantman	Richard Chapman	Bideford	United Kingdom	For private owners.
16 February	Culland's Grove	Merchantman	Fishburn & Brodrick	Whitby	United Kingdom	For Atty & Co.
18 March	Admiral Aplin	East Indiaman	Temple	South Shields	United Kingdom	For Moses Agar.
20 March	Grampus	Diomede-class ship of the line		Portsmouth Dockyard	United Kingdom	For Royal Navy.
22 March	Sir William Bensley	East Indiaman	William Bayley	Ipswich	United Kingdom	For British East India Company.
4 April	Helen	Merchantman	Davidson	Chittagong	India	For private owner.
5 April	Alexander	Merchantman		Bombay	India	For private owner.
5 April	Glory	East Indiaman	John Bass	Topsham	United Kingdom	For British East India Company.
15 April	Rhin	Virginie-class frigate		Toulon	France	For French Navy.
17 April	Belle Poule	Virginie-class frigate	Crucy	Nantes	France	For French Navy.
18 April	République française	Océan-class ship of the line		Rochefort	France	For French Navy.
19 April	Tottenham	East Indiaman	Thomas Haw	Stockton-on-Tees	United Kingdom	For British East India Company.
23 April	Favourite	Merchantman	Thomas King	Dover	United Kingdom	For private owner.
24 April	Ranger	Cutter	Perkins	Plymouth	United Kingdom	For Board of Customs.
27 April	Devaynes	East Indiaman		Liverpool	United Kingdom	For British East India Company.
April	Eurydice	Frigate		Rotterdam	Batavian Republic	For Batavian Navy.
April	King George	Merchantman	Thomas Allen	Dover	United Kingdom	For private owner.
5 May	Diana	Brig or snow	John & Philip Laing	Sunderland	United Kingdom	For Mr Wilson.
5 May	Olive	Merchantman	J Gilmour & Co.	Calcutta	India	For private owner.
10 May	Rover	Merchantman	Godbold	Ipswich	United Kingdom	For private owner.
22 May	Colibri	Alcyon-class brig	Antoine, Louis, & Mathurin Crucy	Nantes	France	For French Navy.
29 May	Surveillante	Virginie-class frigate	Les Frères Crucy	Nantes	France	For French Navy.
17 June	Albion	Fame-class ship of the line	Perry, Wells & Green	Blackwall Yard	United Kingdom	For Royal Navy.
29 June	Atalante	Virginie-class frigate	Enterprise Ethéart	Saint-Malo	France	For French Navy.
30 June	Épervier	Alcyon-class brig	Antoine, Louis and Matherin Crucy	Nantes	France	For French Navy.
19 July	Fylla	Sixth rate		Copenhagen	Denmark-Norway	For Dano-Norwegian Navy.
29 July	Ethalion	Frigate		Woolwich Dockyard	United Kingdom	For Royal Navy.
6 August	Arkhangel Uriil	Third rate	M. Sarychev	Saint Petersburg	Russia	For Imperial Russian Navy.
6 August	Rafail	Third rate	M. Sarychev	Saint Petersburg	Russia	For Imperial Russian Navy.
13 August	King George	Cutter		Berwick upon Tweed	United Kingdom	For Old Shipping Company.
13 August	Queen Charlotte	Cutter		Berwick upon Tweed	United Kingdom	For Old Shipping Company.
22 August	Selafail	Selafail-class ship of the line	I. P. Amosov	Saint Petersburg	Russia	For Imperial Russian Navy.
August	Bonaparte	Packet ship			France	For private owner.
12 October	Harriet	East Indiaman	Perry	Blackwall	United Kingdom	For British East India Company.
12 October	Royal George	East Indiaman	Perry	Blackwall	United Kingdom	For British East India Company.
27 October	Earl Camden	East Indiaman	Pitcher	Northfleet	United Kingdom	For British East India Company.
29 October	Experiment	East Indiaman	John Wells	Blackwall	United Kingdom	For British East India Company.
30 October	Gavriil	First rate	A. S. Katsanov	Saint Petersburg	Russia	For Imperial Russian Navy.
October	Sir William Pulteney	Merchantman	Gillett & Blackmore	Calcutta	India	For private owner.
11 November	Antelope	Fourth rate	Nicholas Diddams	Sheerness Dockyard	United Kingdom	For Royal Navy.
11 November	Cumberland	East Indiaman	John Dudman	Deptford	United Kingdom	For British East India Company.
11 November	Wexford	East Indiaman	William Smith	Limehouse	United Kingdom	For British East India Company.
22 November	Ratnyi	First rate	V. I. Potapov	Kherson	Russia	For Imperial Russian Navy.
25 November	Carmarthen	East Indiaman	Randall	Rotherhithe	United Kingdom	For James Williams.
27 November	Warren Hastings	East Indiaman	Frances Barnard, Son & Roberts	Deptford	United Kingdom	For British East India Company.
9 December	Starling	Brig	Taylor	Harwich	United Kingdom	For Captain Britton.
11 December	Lord Castlereagh	East Indiaman	Barnard	Deptford	United Kingdom	For British East India Company.
11 December	Sceptre	Repulse-class ship of the line	Dudman	Deptford	United Kingdom	For Royal Navy.
Unknown date	Adonis	Merchantman	John & Philip Laing	Sunderland	United Kingdom	For Mr. Starbuck.
Unknown date	Adventure	Schooner		Liverpool	United Kingdom	For Thomas Graham, Thomas Hayes, and Samuel Newton.
Unknown date	Alnwick Packet	Smack		Berwick upon Tweed	United Kingdom	For private owner.
Unknown date	Amphitrite	Full-rigged ship		Appledore	United Kingdom	For Hogg & Co.
Unknown date	Anjengo	Merchantman		Anjengo	India	For John Tady Dyne.
Unknown date	Atalante	Privateer		Bordeaux	France	For private owner.
Unknown date	Barbadoes Packet	Merchantman	John Brockbank	Lancaster	United Kingdom	For private owner.
Unknown date	Belle	Full-rigged ship	Gilmore and Wilson	Calcutta	India	For Samuel Manesty.
Unknown date	Betsey	Brig	Nicholas Bools & William Good	Bridport	United Kingdom	For Edward Bartlett and John Cox.
Unknown date	Britannia	Merchantman		Hull	United Kingdom	For Fletcher & Co.
Unknown date	Carleton	Merchantman			(United Kingdom of Great Britain and Ireland) New Brunswick or Nova Scotia	For Thorn & Co.
Unknown date	Caroline	Merchantman	Robert Davy	Topsham	United Kingdom	For Mr. Hayman.
Unknown date	Carrier	Cutter	Nicholas Bools & William Good	Bridport	United Kingdom	For private owner.
Unknown date	César	Brig			France	For private owner.
Unknown date	Charlotte Dundas	Sternwheeler	William Symington		United Kingdom	For Lord Dundas.
Unknown date	Chilton	Merchantman	Fishburn & Brodrick	Whitby	United Kingdom	For Harrison Chilton, Thomas Chilton, and Thomas Pierson.
Unknown date	Demerara	Merchantman	John Brockbank	Lancaster	United Kingdom	For private owner.
Unknown date	Eddystone	Full-rigged ship		Hull	United Kingdom	For Capt. Featherstone.
Unknown date	Enchantress	Merchantman	builder	Ringmore	United Kingdom	For Mr. Riblesdale.
Unknown date	Experiment	Merchantman		Georgia	United States	For private owner.
Unknown date	Fama	Brev-Drageren-class brig	Frantz Hohlenberg	Copenhagen	Denmark-Norway	For Dano-Norwegian Navy.
Unknown date	Frederick	Merchantman	John & Philip Laing	Sunderland	United Kingdom	For R. Hutton.
Unknown date	Gardiner and Joseph	Whaler		Hull	United Kingdom	For Mr. Foggingtons.
Unknown date	George	Sloop		Sydney	(United Kingdom of Great Britain and Ireland) New South Wales	For John Palmer.
Unknown date	Gleaner	Ketch			United Kingdom	For private owner.
Unknown date	Henry Addington	West Indiaman		London	United Kingdom	For private owner.
Unknown date	Hope	Whaler		Peterhead	United Kingdom	For private owner.
Unknown date	Hope	Sloop	Andrew Thompson	Hawkesbury River	(United Kingdom of Great Britain and Ireland) New South Wales	For Andrew Thompson.
Unknown date	Imperial	Slave ship	Temple	South Shields	United Kingdom	For Mr. Henderson.
Unknown date	Jane	Cutter	Nicholas Bools & William Good	Bridport	United Kingdom	For Samuel Gundry and others.
Unknown date	Jeune Amélie	Merchantman			France	For private owner.
Unknown date	John	Merchantman	John Brockbank	Lancaster	United Kingdom	For private owner.
Unknown date	King George Packet	Smack		Berwick upon Tweed	United Kingdom	For Old Shipping Company.
Unknown date	Lark	Sloop	Nicholas Bools & William Good	Bridport	United Kingdom	For William Good.
Unknown date	Liberty	Brig		Hylton	United Kingdom	For Mr. Storey.
Unknown date	Livonia	Merchantman	John & Philip Laing	Sunderland	United Kingdom	For Cummins & Co.
Unknown date	Lord Eldon	British East India Company.	Temple	South Shields	United Kingdom	
Unknown date	Magdalen	Merchantman		Methil	United Kingdom	For Mr. Scoughal.
Unknown date	Maister	Merchantman		Hull	United Kingdom	For Maister & Co.
Unknown date	Marquis Cornwallis	Merchantman		Sunderland	United Kingdom	For private owner.
Unknown date	Mary Anna	Merchantman		Sunderland	United Kingdom	For private owner.
Unknown date	Melville	Merchantman		Calcutta	India	For private owner.
Unknown date	Meşreb-i Nusret	Fifth rate			Ottoman Empire	For Ottoman Navy.
Unknown date	Nancy	Sloop	Nicholas Bools & William Good	Bridport	United Kingdom	For Nicholas Bools & William Good.
Unknown date	Nesim-i Fütuh	Fifth rate			Ottoman Empire	For Ottoman Navy.
Unknown date	Nimble	Schooner		Hull	United Kingdom	For T. Bentley & Co.
Unknown date	Ocean	Full-rigged ship	Baldwin & Beatson		(United Kingdom of Great Britain and Ireland) Lower Canada	For private owner.
Unknown date	Owners Delight	Sloop	Nicholas Bools & William Good	Bridport	United Kingdom	For Mr. Beer.
Unknown date	Pacific	Merchantman	Peter & William Mellish	Rotherhithe	United Kingdom	For Peter Mellish.
Unknown date	Queen Charlotte	Smack	Gowan	Berwick upon Tweed	United Kingdom	For Old Ship Company.
Unknown date	Recovery	Merchantman		Yarmouth	(United Kingdom of Great Britain and Ireland) Nova Scotia	For A. Grigg.
Unknown date	Santa Leocadia	Gun-brig			Spain	For Spanish Navy.
Unknown date	Santa Maria	Full-rigged ship	Nicholas Bools & William Good	Bridport	United Kingdom	For Mr. Gonsilva.
Unknown date	Sir Andrew Snape Hammond	Merchantman	M. Smith	Calcutta	India	For private owner.
Unknown date	Sir Sidney Smith	West Indiaman		Dover	United Kingdom	For private owner.
Unknown date	Starling	Merchantman		Harwich	United Kingdom	For W. Britton.
Unknown date	Tajbux	Merchantman		Bombay	India	For the Imam of Muscat.
Unknown date	Thomas Henchman	East Indiaman	M. Smith	Calcutta	India	For private owner.
Unknown date	Three Sisters	Merchantman	John Brockbank	Lancaster	United Kingdom	For private owner.
Unknown date	Vigilant	Merchantman			United Kingdom	For H. Roper.
Unknown date	Name unknown	Merchantman		Freeport, Maine	United States	For private owner.
Unknown date	Name unknown	Merchantman			France	For private owner.
Unknown date	Name unknown	Merchantman			United States	For private owner.
Unknown date	Name unknown	Merchantman			France	For private owner.
Unknown date	Name unknown	Merchantman			Spain	For Private owner
Unknown date	Name unknown	Merchantman		Minorca	Spain	For private owner.
Unknown date	Name unknown	Barque			France	For private owner.
