= List of ships owned by Daniel Bennett & Son =

By the early 19th century, Daniel Bennett was the most important owner of vessels engaging in whale hunting in the Southern Whale Fishery. At one point he had some 17 vessels out whale hunting. He also owned vessels that were traders rather than whalers.

Bennett purchased vessels rather than having them built for him. Many of Bennett's vessels appear to have been prizes to the Royal Navy, or warships that the Navy was disposing of after the end of the French Revolutionary (1802), or Napoleonic Wars (1815). Name changes make it difficult, or impossible absent original research, to identify many of the vessels' earlier histories.

The list below is primarily from Stanbury, but also incorporates information from articles on the vessels themselves.

- Active (1789–1792)
- Active (1801–1803}
- Active (1804–1805)
- Adventure (1804–1808)
- African (1803–1810)
- Ann (1793–1797)
- Antelope (1804–1805)
- Arab (1819–1820)
- Arab (1813–1824)
- Barbara (1800-1802)
- Benson (1810–1811)
- Betsy (1785 or 1791–1811)
- Caledonia (1800–1806)
- Cape Packet (1821–1830)
- Catherine (1813–1833)
- Ceres (1791)
- Conservative (1836)
- Countess de Galvaez (1794)
- Currency Lass (1839)
- Daniel (1818–1832)
- Daniel IVth (1823–1830)
- Diana (1802–1821)
- Diana (1829-April 1843)
- Dave (1827–1832)
- Duke of Portland (1797–1811)
- Echo (1809–1821)
- Eclipse (1824–1842)
- Elligood (1795–1805)
- Fancy (1790)
- Fanny (1794–1803)
- Favorite (1799–1803)
- Favourite (1808)
- Favourite (1819–1823)
- Favourite (1816–1845)
- Ferret (1802–1816)
- Flirt (1796–1803)
- Francis (1819–1826)
- Frederick (1813–1821)
- Georgia Packet (1813)
- Grand Sachem (1815–1822)
- Greenwich (1830–1833)
- Hillsborough (1799)
- Hunter (1815–1822)
- Indispensable (1796–1827)
- Inspector (1802–1822)
- James Hay (1818–1822)
- Japan (1831)
- Kent (1838–1844)
- Kingston (1798–1802)
- Lively (1786–1792)
- Lively (1799–1808)
- Lord Hawkesbury (1792–1796)
- Lovely Ann (1819–1825)
- Lucy (1804)
- Lune (1817–1820)
- Magnet (1832–1835)
- Mariana/Marianne/Mary Ann (1818–1830)
- Mary (1805–1810)
- Mary (1821–1823)
- Morning Star (1813)
- Nereid/Neried (1814)
- New Zealander (1808–1825)
- Nimrod (1839)
- Ocean (1820–1825)
- Ocean (1822–1825)
- Phoenix (1812–1829)
- Pritzler (1796–1798)
- Rambler (1803–1807)
- Ranger (1804–1819)
- Ranger (1819–1832)
- Ranger (1836–1848)
- Rapid (1820–1826)
- Recovery (1802–1813)
- Recovery (1813–1843)
- Recovery (1810–1817)
- Reliance (1833–1838)
- Royal George (1816–1825)
- Royal Sovereign (1825–1835)
- Sally (1796–1814)
- Sarah (1821–1837)
- Sir Charles Price (1815-1833)
- Sisters (1825–1830)
- Sprightly (1801–1809)
- Timor (1813–1834)
- Vansittart (1817–1829)
- Venus (1805–1811)
- Vere (1790-1793) (Note: Vere may have been a whaler in the British Southern Whale Fishery between 1790 and 1793. She never appeared in Lloyd's Register or Lloyd's List so little is known about her origins and fate. Some records state that she was built in 1774, but it is not clear under what name. Her master for her intended whaling voyage apparently was Robert Blyth.)
- William (1825–1827)
- Young William (1794-1810)

The following vessels are listed in Stanbury, but appear not to be whalers, or Bennett-owned vessels.

- Lyra (1824–1833)
- Stormont (1784–c.1794)
- Tyne (1821–1831)
