= Vigilant (ship) =

Several vessels have been named Vigilant:

- Vigilant (1783 ship) was launched in 1780 at Sunderland as Alfred but in 1783 new owners renamed her. She became a West Indiaman and then a slave ship in the triangular trade in enslaved people. As she was gathering slaves on the coast of Africa the slaves on board captured her and ran her aground.
- Vigilant (1794 Baltimore schooner) was a Baltimore schooner, possibly originally launched in 1794 as Nonsuch. She appeared in the Danish West Indies as Vigilant from 1824. She carried the mail and passenger traffic between St. Croix and St. Thomas in the 19th and the first decade of the 20th century. A storm sank Vigilant on 12 September 1928.
- Vigilant (1802 ship) was built in Britain, but the date and place of her launching are obscure. Vigilant first appeared in Lloyd's Register (LR) in 1802, having undergone a repair in that year, which suggests that she may have been launched some years earlier under another name. She made one complete voyage as a whaler to the British southern whale fishery, and was captured in the Pacific on her second whaling voyage.
- Vigilant (1852 bark) was built in 1852. She served in the whaling trade, making eight voyages from New Bedford between 1852 and 1879 before being wrecked in 1879.
