= Venus (ship) =

Several vessels have been named Venus for the planet Venus or the Roman goddess Venus:

== Venus (1788 ship) ==
Venus (1788 ship) was launched at Deptford in 1788 and made 15 voyages as a whaler in the British Southern Whale Fishery. She was last listed in 1823.

== Venus (1802 ship) ==
Venus, of 70 tons (bm) was a British schooner of uncertain origin. The registers give inconsistent information. Venus first appeared in Lloyd's Register (LR) in 1802 with the description that she was nine years old and American in origin. She first appeared in the Register of Shipping (RS) in 1804 with her origin being given as a Spanish prize and a launch year of 1800. She made one complete voyage in 1802–1803 as a slave ship in the triangular trade in enslaved people. A French privateer on a highly successful cruise, captured Venus in 1804 on her second enslaving voyage and took her into Cayenne. 1st enslaving voyage (1802–1803): Captain James Hasler sailed from Liverpool on 17 October 1802. Venus acquired captives at Bassa, and arrived at Barbados on 3 May 1803 with 95 captives. She sailed from Barbados on 12 May and arrived back at Liverpool on 8 June. She had left Liverpool with 10 crew members and she suffered no crew deaths on her voyage. While she was at Barbados Venus had been sold. 2nd enslaving voyage (1803-Loss): Captain Hasler sailed from Liverpool on 26 October 1803. (Note: One source gives the master's name as Hasley.) On 16 April 1804 the French privateer Uncle Thomas (or Mon Oncle Thomas), captured Venus, Haslar, master, on the Windward Coast. (Note: Mon Oncle Thomas was a three-masted privateer from La Rochelle. Her third cruise, under Pierre d'Harambide, took place from February 1804 to June 1804. For her fourth cruise she was under Auguste Papin with 220 men and the same armament. She cruised from September 1804 to November 1804, when a British frigate captured her in the Atlantic.) Mon Oncle Thomas sent Venus into Cayenne. Lloyd's List reported in July 1804 that "Uncle Toby" had captured Imperial, Price, master, as Imperial was coming from Africa, and had sent Imperial into Cayenne. French sources give the dates of capture as 30 January 1804 for Venus and 17 March for Imperial. At Cayenne Papin sold Venus and Imperial. Apparently the slaves from Venus commanded a good price. Some sold for as much as 2,450 francs each; none sold for less than 2,008 francs each. The two prizes resulted in a net gain of Fr.900,000 to the owners of Mon Oncle Thomas. In 1804, 30 British slave ships were lost. Venus was one of eight lost on the coast. War, not maritime hazards nor slave resistance, was the greatest cause of vessel losses among British slave vessels.

== Venus (1805 ship) ==
The brig Venus, of 103 or 140 tons (bm), was a French prize of the same name. She may have been the French privateer Venus of Nantes, built 1799–1800, that the East Indiaman Union had captured on 22 August 1804. She was 66 ft 6 in (20.27 m) long, with a beam of 19 ft 3 in (5.87 m), and was armed with four 3–pounder guns and two each 9– and 12–pounder carronades. Between 1805 and 1811 she belonged to Daniel Bennett & Son. She first appeared in Lloyd's Register (LR) in 1805, but Bennett's failure to update her listing in LR or the Register of Shipping has made it impossible to trace her voyages in the ship arrival and departure data in Lloyd's List. Two sources identify Venus as a whaler. She called into Rio de Janeiro in July 1805 to replenish her water and provisions. Then in November 1806 Venus, Tom Taylor, master, again called in at Rio, and this time needed repairs. Venus was lost in 1811.

== Venus (1807 ship) ==
Venus (1807 ship) was built in Mauritius in 1807. She spent most of her career sailing between London and the Cape of Good Hope (CGH), and Mauritius. She wrecked in July 1826 while sailing from Sydney to Singapore.

== Venus (1809 ship) ==
Venus (1809 ship) was launched at Chittagong in 1809 as a country ship. She participated as a transport in two British invasions. Then in 1815 USS Peacock captured her. By 1818 or so she was back under British ownership. She may have traded with New South Wales and the Cape of Good Hope. She was last listed in 1833.

== Venus (1815 ship) ==
Venus (1815 ship) was launched in France in 1802, possibly under another name. A Guernsey privateer captured her in 1805, but she first appeared as Venus in British sources in 1815. She traded generally until in 1830 she carried cargo to Port Jackson. Between 1831 and 1835 she made three voyages from Port Jackson as a whaler, sailing primarily to New Zealand waters. She returned to England and was last listed in 1838.

== See also ==
- HMS Venus – any one of five ships of the Royal Navy
- HM hired armed lugger Venus
- Venus (disambiguation)#Ships, for several other ships and vessels
- "Good Ship Venus", a drinking song
