= Mon Oncle Thomas (1793 ship) =

French three-masted privateer

History

France
- Name: Mon Oncle Thomas
- Acquired: 1793 by purchase of a prize
- Captured: Late 1804

General characteristics
- Tons burthen: 300–350 (French; "of load")
- Length: 35.40 m (116 ft 2 in)
- Beam: 8.77 m (28 ft 9 in)
- Draught: 1.78 m (5 ft 10 in)
- Complement: 1st cruise:150; 2nd cruise:200−230; 3rd cruise:200; 4th cruise:200
- Armament: 1st cruise:16 guns; 2nd cruise:18 × 8-pounder guns + 8 × 12-pounder carronades; 3rd cruise:18 × 8-pounder guns + 8 × 12-pounder carronades; 4th cruise:18 × 8-pounder guns + 8 × 12-pounder carronades

Mon Oncle Thomas was a three-masted privateer from La Rochelle. She was possibly the former Spanish Rosa, of 300 to 350 tonnes, captured in 1793. From at least 1799 on she made four cruises as a privateer. She participated in the short-lived recapture of the island of Gorée from the British. She made several highly profitable captures and engaged in at least one successful single-ship action. The British Royal Navy captured her in late 1804.

== Career ==
At some point between 1797 and 1802, the Chégaray brothers commissioned Mon Oncle Thomas and put her under the command of Abraham-Jean-Louis Giscard.

1st privateering cruise (December 1799–April 1800): On 7 November 1800, Mon Oncle Thomas, Captain Jean Fizel, left La Rochelle. She cruised between the Azores and Cape Clear, and returned to Pauillac and La Rochelle on 22 January 1801.

In January 1801 Lloyd's List (LL) reported that Uncle Thomas, of Rochelle, had captured three British vessels and sent them into Rochelle. The three were Eliza, Brown, master, which had been sailing from London to Philadelphia, Britannia, Smith, master, which had been sailing from Martinique to London, and Brickwood, Stoddard, master, which had been sailing from Quebec to London. (Note: On 16 January 1801, HMS Thames recaptured Eliza and sent her into Plymouth.) (Note: LL reported that the privateer Arriege had captured and sent into Gijon Britannia, Smith, master, which had been sailing from Martinique to London.) (Note: Brickwood, of 255 tons (bm), and six 6-pounder guns, had been built in France in 1794. She was ten years old. Her entry in LR for 1804 carried the annotation "Captured".)

In early 1801, Mon Oncle Thomas, of Rochelle, fitted out by Citizen Segaray, captured the British Guineaman Leander, of twenty-six 18-pounder carronades, after an action in which the British captain was wounded. Leander was returning to England from Jamaica and was carrying a cargo of coffee, sugar, and indigo; she had an estimated value of Fr.1.5mn. Mon Oncle Thomas brought Leander into Bordeaux.

2nd privateering cruise (September 1803-January 1804): In the autumn the Chégary brothers and J.B. Gramont, of Bordeaux, fitted out Mon Oncle for her second cruise, and appointed André Papin as her captain.

In January 1804 Mon Oncle Thomas was at Dakar, Senegal. She had put into Dakar to request an extension of her letter of marque. The Commandant promised to renew the letter on condition that Mon Oncle Thomas join an expedition from Cayenne that had come to recapture the island of Gorée from the British. Captain Papin acceded to the request and on 17–8 January participated in the successful attack.

The French authorities at Senegal rewarded Papin by granting him 25,000 francs and 23 slaves. He immediately sold 19 of the slaves for 8,180 francs. When Mon Oncle Thomas arrived at Cayenne, Papin sold the remaining four slaves to Farnous & Co. for 4,693 francs.

3rd privateering cruise (February 1804-June 1804): For her third cruise, Mon Oncle Thomas was under the command of Pierre d'Harambide.

On 16 April Mon Oncle Thomas captured the slave ship Venus, Hassler, master, off the Windward Coast. Mon Oncle Thomas sent Venus into Cayenne. (Note: French sources give the dates of capture as 30 January 1804.)

LL reported in July 1804, that "Uncle Toby" had captured Imperial, Price, master, as Imperial was coming from Africa, and had sent Imperial into Cayenne. (Note: French sources give the dates of capture as 17 March for Imperial.)

At Cayenne Papin sold Venus and Imperial and the slaves they were carrying. Apparently they commanded a good price. Some, from one of the two prizes, sold for as much as 2,450 francs each; none sold for less than 2,008 francs each.

French sources report that the Tribunal of Commerce in La Rochelle valued the gains on the voyage from the sales of slaves, cargo, and captured vessels at 261,753 francs. One third of this amount went to the captain and crew of Mon Oncle Thomas; two thirds went to the investors in the vessel and the venture. In all, Mon Oncle Thomas's second and third voyages together netted the Chégaray brothers and J.B.Grammont 900,000 francs.

4th privateering cruise (September 1804–November 1804): For her fourth cruise, Mon Oncle Thomas was again under the command of Auguste Papin.

LL reported in September that Uncle Thomas had captured at 40°30′N 25°10′W two vessels, Mary, of Greenock, which had been sailing to Virginia, and Two Sisters, of Dartmouth, which had been sailing from Newfoundland. (Note: Mary is unfortunately a common name for vessels. Still, she appears to have been Mary, J.Hilton, master, of 238 tons (bm), launched in New England in 1794, and American owned but British-registered. Her entry in LR gave her trade as Greenock–Virginia.) (Note: Two Sisters, of 60 tons (bm), H.White, master, had been built in Nova Scotia in 1798 and had undergone a thorough repair in 1804. The French prize master sailed Two Sisters for Ushant. As she approached the port the French prize crew sighted some sails that they thought might be British naval vessels, and took to her boats, abandoning her, and her mate and a boy who had been part of the original crew and whom the French had kept onboard. The two had no compass, quadrant, or the like, and few provisions. The two were at sea for some 20 days before they succeeded in reaching Ilfracombe.) Polly brought into Penzance on 3 September 11 crew from the vessels. (Note: Polly was a government transport, coming from Jamaica with French prisoners of war from San Domingo, 23 of whom had died on the voyage. When she arrived at Plymouth she went into quarantine. She was a cartel; she had come from Port Royal and was to go on to France.)

In November LL reported that Uncle Thomas had captured Abeona, which had been sailing from Falmouth to Quebec, and had taken Abeona into Vigo. (Note: Abeona, of 139 tons (bm), G.Cook, master, had been built in Yarmouth in 1803. She had sailed from Portsmouth on 7 September, bound for Quebec.)

== Fate ==
A British frigate captured Mon Oncle Thomas in the Atlantic in November 1804. The only mention of the capture in online British sources occurred in a letter dated 2 January 1805, from Lord Nelson to Commissioner Otway in Malta in which Nelson reported that HMS Fisgard had sent into Gibraltar the fast-sailing French privateer, Oncle Thomas, of eighteen 9-pounder guns.
