= Scaleby Castle (1798 EIC ship) =

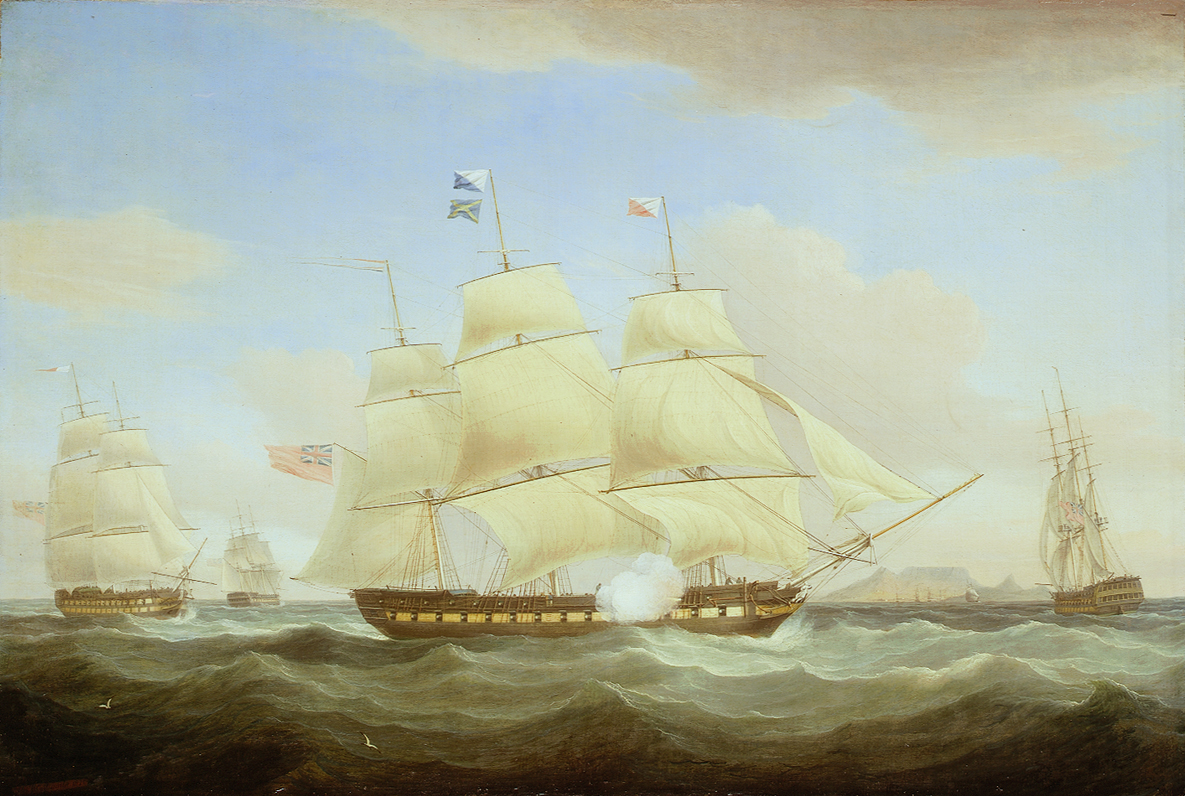
- The East Indiamen Minerva, Scaleby Castle and Charles Grant; Thomas Whitcombe, 1820 - National Maritime Museum, Greenwich

History

Great Britain
- Name: Scaleby Castle
- Namesake: Scaleby Castle
- Owner: 1798:Bruce, Fawcett & Co.; 1806:William Moffat
- Builder: Jamsetjee Bomanjee Wadia, Bombay Dockyard
- Launched: 13 August 1798
- Fate: Sold 1816

United Kingdom
- Name: Scaleby Castle
- Owner: British East India Company
- Acquired: 1816
- Fate: Sold 1835

United Kingdom
- Name: Scaleby Castle
- Owner: 1835:Henry Templer; 1835:James Walkinshaw
- Acquired: 1835 by purchase
- Fate: Last listed 1841; sold 1847 for a hulk

General characteristics
- Tons burthen: 1216 or 1237, or 12377/94, or 124127/94, or 1242, or 1256 (bm)
- Length: Overall:163 ft 6 1/2 in (49.8 m); Keel:131 ft 10 1/2 in (40.2 m)
- Beam: 42 ft 1 in (12.8 m)
- Depth of hold: 17 ft 8 in (5.4 m)
- Sail plan: Full-rigged ship
- Complement: 1799:148; 1806:135; 1811:135
- Armament: 1799:26 × 24-pounder guns; 1806:38 × 12&24-pounder guns (Note: Moffat negotiated with the EIC to change Scaleby Castle's armament. Under his original contract with the EIC he had undertaken for her to carry twenty-eight 12-pounder guns on her gun deck and ten 18-pounder carronades on her spar deck. The EIC agreed to permit him to arm her with twenty-four 18-pounder cannonades on her gun deck, and twelve 18-pounder carronades on spar deck. (A cannonade was a cannon that had a shorter barrel than a gun, but a longer barrel than a carronade.); 1811:38 × 12&18-pounder guns
- Notes: Three decks

Scaleby Castle was launched in 1798 at Bombay. She made three voyages for the British East India Company (EIC) under charter. At the end of the first she changed to British Registry. Her owners sold her in 1806 to William Moffat, who then entered into a four-voyage contract with the EIC as a regular ship. The EIC purchased Scaleby Castle outright in 1816. She proceeded to make 10 more voyages for the EIC. In all, she made 17 voyages for the EIC, a record. In 1833-35 the EIC ended its commercial activities and sold its vessels. New owners continued to sail Scaleby Castle to China and India. She was last listed in 1841. In 1847 her owners sold her as a hulk.

== Country ship ==
Scaleby Castle was a country ship, that is, one sailing within the East Indies between India and China. She was the first India-built ship that the EIC chartered, and made three voyages for the EIC as an "extra" ship.

EIC voyage #1 (1798-1799): Captain Patrick Gardner sailed from Bombay 20 December 1798. On 26 December she was at Mahé, but she returned to Bombay, where she arrived on 9 January 1799. On 23 March Scaleby Castle was at the Cape of Good Hope. She reached St Helena on 24 April, and arrived at The Downs on 13 July.

Scaleby Castle was admitted to the Registry of Great Britain on 11 October 1799. Captain Gardner acquired a letter of marque on 5 December.

EIC voyage #2 (1802): Captain Gardner sailed from Bombay on 3 July 1802, bound for England. Scaleby Castle reached St Helena on 8 September and Kenmair river, Ireland, on 17 November; she arrived at The Downs in December.

EIC voyage #3 (1806): Captain John Guise sailed from Whampoa on 18 January 1806, bound for England. Scaleby Castle reached St Helena on 3 July and arrived at The Downs on 3 September.

== EIC career ==
In 1806 William Moffat purchased Scaleby Castle from Bruce Fawcett. The EIC took her on for four voyages. However, first the EIC had Wells measure and survey her.

EIC voyage #4 (1807–1808): Captain John Loch acquired a letter of marque on 13 December 1806. Scaleby Castle sailed from Portsmouth on 26 February 1807. She returned to her moorings on 1 July 1808.

EIC voyage #5 (1809–1810): Captain Loch sailed from Portsmouth on 24 February 1809, bound for Bombay and China. Scaleby Castle reached Bombay on 25 June. She was at Penang on 31 August and Macao on 14 October. She arrived at Whampoa Anchorage on 6 November. Homeward bound, she crossed the Second Bar on 21 December, reached St Helena on 21 May 1810, and arrived at The Downs on 28 July.

EIC voyage #6 (1811–1812): Captain Thomas Talbot Harington acquired a letter of marque on 27 February. He sailed from Torbay on 12 May, bound for Bombay and China. Scaleby Castle reached Bombay on 6 September and Batavia on 27 December. She arrived at Whampoa on 9 March 1812. Homeward bound, she crossed the Second Bar on 29 March and reached St Helena on 23 July. In September Scaleby Castle, Dorsetshire, Lord Eldon, Batavia, and Cornwall were at 14°8′N 28°11′W on their way from Saint Helena to England and under escort by HMS Loire. and arrived on 24 October in the Downs.

EIC voyage #7 (1813–1815): Captain Harington sailed from Portsmouth on 31 December 1813, bound for St Helena, Batavia, and China. Scaleby Castle reached St Helena on 5 April 1814 and the Cape on 26 May, before arriving at Batavia on 31 August. From there she sailed to Samarang, which she reached on 7 October, and Amboina, which she reached on 24 December. She arrived at Whampoa on 28 February 1815. Homeward bound, she crossed the Second Bar on 25 March and returned to Batavia on 24 May. She reached the Cape on 28 July and St Helena on 11 September. She arrived at The Downs on 14 November.

The EIC then purchased Scaleby Castle outright.

EIC voyage #8 (1816–1817): Captain William Moffat sailed from The Downs on 17 April 1816, bound for China. Scaleby Castle was at Penang on 10 August and arrived at Whampoa on 3 November. Homeward bound, she crossed the Second Bar on 18 December, reached St Helena on 10 April 1817, and arrived at The Downs on 4 June.

EIC voyage #9 (1818–1819): Captain John Barnet Sotheby sailed from The Downs on 19 April 1818, bound for China. Scaleby Castle arrived at Whampoa on 18 August. Homeward bound she crossed the Second Bar on 3 November, reached St Helena on 9 February 1819, and arrived at The Downs on 4 May.

EIC voyage #10 (1820–1821): Captain John Barnet Sotheby sailed from The Downs on 26 March 1820, bound for China. Scaleby Castle reached Whampoa on 28 August. Homeward bound, she crossed the Second Bar on 6 November, reached St Helena on 10 March 1821, and arrived at The Downs on 10 May.

EIC voyage #11 (1821–1822): Captain David Rae Newall sailed from The Downs on 18 August 1821, bound for China. Scaleby Castle arrived at Whampoa on 21 January 1822. Homeward bound, she crossed the Second Bar on 12 April, reached St Helena on 6 August, and arrived at The Downs on 10 October.

EIC voyage #12 (1823–1824): Captain Newall sailed from Portsmouth on 15 March 1823, bound for Bombay and China. Scaleby Castle reached Bombay on 23 June, left on 5 August, and arrived at Whampoa on 2 October. Homeward bound, she crossed the Second Bar on 3 January 1824, reached St Helena on 10 March, and arrived at The Downs on 5 May.

EIC voyage #13 (1825–1826): Captain Newall sailed from The Downs on 19 February 1825, bound for Bengal and China. Scaleby Castle arrived at Saugor on 8 June and left on 16 September. She was at Penang on 26 September and Malacca on 19 October; she arrived at Whampoa on 12 November. Homeward bound, she crossed the Second Bar on 15 January 1826 and arrived at The Downs on 17 May.

EIC voyage #14 (1827–1828): Captain Newall sailed from The Downs on 11 February 1827, bound for Bengal and China. Scaleby Castle arrived at Saugor on 11 June and left on 24 August. She was at Penang on 6 September and Singapore on 1 October; she arrived at Whampoa on 15 November. Homeward bound, she crossed the Second Bar on 20 January 1828, reached St Helena on 12 April, and arrived at The Downs on 3 June.

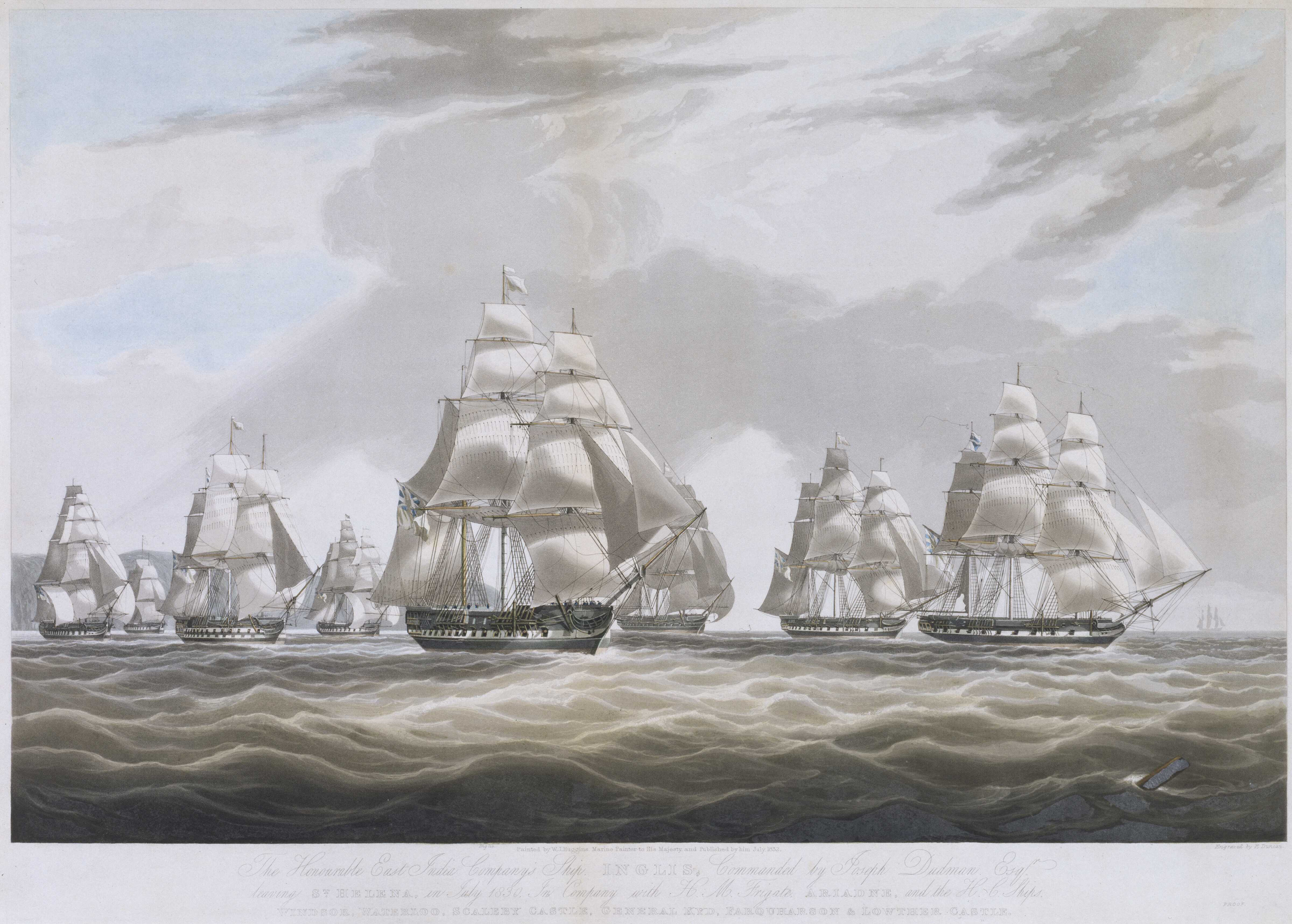
The Honourable East India Company's Ship Inglis - leaving St Helena in July 1830, in company with H.M. Frigate Ariadne and the H.C. Ships Windsor, Waterloo, Scaleby Castle, General Kidd, Farquharson & Lowther Castle

EIC voyage #15 (1829–1830): Captain James B Burnett sailed from The Downs on 9 May 1829, bound for China. On 11 September Scaleby Castle reached Toonkoo, Cap Sing Moon Bay on 23 November, and Whampoa on 11 February 1830. Homeward bound, she crossed the Second Bar on 2 April, reached St Helena on 3 July, and arrived at The Downs on 29 August.

EIC voyage #16 (1831–1832): Captain John Hillman sailed from Torbay on 7 May 1831, bound for China. Scaleby Castle arrived at Whampoa on 10 September. Homeward bound, she crossed the Second Bar on 20 January 1832, reached St Helena on 3 April, and arrived at The Downs on 22 May.

EIC voyage #17 (1833–1834): Captain Hillman sailed from The Downs on 4 May 1833. Scaleby Castle arrived at Whampoa on 27 August. Homeward bound, she crossed the Second Bar on 25 October, reached St Helena on 4 January 1834, and arrived at The Downs on 24 February.

== Late career ==
The EIC gave up its commercial activities in 1833 and sold off its vessels. It sold Scaleby Castle to Henry Templer on 6 August 1834 for £6,900. Then on 11 October James Walkinshaw purchased her with stores and ready for sea for £13,500.

Year	Master	Owner	Trade
1835	T. Sandys	Templer & Co.	London–China
1836	T.Sandys; Robertson	Templer & Co. Wilkinson	London–China; London–Bombay
1840	Robertson	Wilkinshaw	London–Bombay
1841	Robertson	Wilkinshaw	London–Bombay

== Fate ==
Scaleby Castle was last listed in 1841. She was sold on 1 December 1847 at Lloyd's Coffee House as a hulk.
