= Cornwall (1810 ship) =

British ship

History

United Kingdom
- Name: Cornwall
- Namesake: Cornwall
- Owner: George Palmer
- Builder: Mathew Smith, Howrah, Calcutta
- Launched: 3 July 1810
- Fate: Wrecked 15 July 1858

General characteristics
- Tons burthen: 798, or 79879/94, or 795 or 808, or 859, or 85928/94, or 872 (bm)
- Length: Overall: 139 ft 0 in (42.4 m); Keel: 110 ft 8 3/4 in (33.8 m)
- Beam: 36 ft 10 in (11.2 m)
- Depth of hold: 13 ft 10 in (4.2 m)
- Complement: 75
- Armament: 12 guns

Cornwall was launched at Calcutta in 1810. She participated as a transport in two military campaigns more than 40 years apart. In between, she made four voyages for the British East India Company (EIC), carried assisted immigrants from England to Sydney, and transported convicts to Tasmania. She was wrecked at Mauritius in July 1858.

== Career ==
For the invasions of Île Bourbon and Île de France (Mauritius) the British government hired a number of transport vessels. Most of the transports were "country ships"(vessels trading only east of the Cape of Good Hope), among them Cornwall.

Next, Cornwall made the first of what would become four voyages for the EIC.

1st EIC voyage (1812): Captain George Henderson sailed from Calcutta on 12 May 1812, bound for Great Britain. She was at Mauritius on 28 June, and reached St Helena on 23 August. In September Cornwall, Dorsetshire, Scaleby Castle, Batavia, and Lord Eldon were at 14°8′N 28°11′W on their way from Saint Helena to England and under escort by HMS Loire. They arrived at Long Reach on 26 October.

Cornwall was admitted to the registries of Great Britain on 13 April 1813. In 1813, the EIC lost its monopoly on the trade between India and Britain. British ships were then free to sail to India or the Indian Ocean under a license from the EIC. This meant that she could trade between the Indies and Great Britain and France, even when not under charter to the EIC, so long as she acquired a license for each non-EIC voyage.

She first appeared in Lloyd's Register (LR) in the volume for 1813.

| Year | Master | Owner | Trade | Source |
|---|---|---|---|---|
| 1813 | Henderson | Henderson | London–East Indies | LR |

On 26 November, Cornwall, Henderson, master, sailed from Portsmouth, bound for the Cape. On 16 December, she came into Madeira having had to throw some of her guns, and some copper and lumber overboard. She sailed from the Cape on 16 April 1814, bound for Madras and Bengal.

On 23 March 1815 Cornwall, Henderson, master, arrived at Deal. She had left Bengal on 21 November 1814, and had sailed via St Helena.

2nd EIC voyage (1816–1817): Captain James (or Jeremiah) R.J.Toussaint sailed from the Downs on 23 January 1816, bound for St Helena and China. Cornwall was at St Helena on 9 April, and reached Bencoolen on 8 July. She arrived at Whampoa Anchorage on 20 August. Homeward bound, she crossed the Second Bar on 8 November, reached St Helena on 18 January 1817, and arrived at Long Reach on 13 March. She was at Gravesend on 30 March.

3rd EIC voyage (1819–1820): Captain John Peter Wilson sailed from Portsmouth on 22 April 1819, bound for China. She arrived at Whampoa on 4 September. Homeward bound, she crossed the Second Bar on 22 November, and reached St Helena on 6 February 1820.

On 23 February 1820, when she was two days south of Scilly, Cornwall encountered Prince Regent; one of the vessels provided the other with provisions. Cornwall arrived at Gravesend on 8 April.

4th EIC voyage (1826–1827): Captain William Younghusband sailed from Torbay 25 July 1826, bound for Bengal. She arrived at Diamond Harbour 20 November. Her voyage ended on 1 July 1827.

In 1839 Cornwall was sold to Joseph Somes, of London.

On 12 May 1839, Captain John Cow sailed from Gravesend, bound for Sydney. Cornwall arrived on 1 September. She had embarked 387 Government-assisted emigrants, 150 men, 94 women, and 143 children under 15 years. She arrived with 374 passengers as 18 infants had died on the voyage and five had been born. The migrants were primarily farm labourers.

| Year | Master | Owner | Trade | Source & notes |
|---|---|---|---|---|
| 1841 | Cow | J.Somes | London transport London–China | LR |
| 1851 | Maundrell | Luscombe | London–Sydney | LR; small repairs 1847 & damages repaired 1851 |

Convict transport (1851): Captain T. Greeves Maundrell sailed from Ireland on 24 January 1851. Cornwall arrived at Hobart on 11 June. She had embarked 300 convicts and may have suffered one convict death on the journey.

During the Crimean War, Cornwall served as a transport in the Black Sea. She was, for a time, a convalescent ship at Therapia. In March 1854, she carried 400 soldiers to Malta, new troops for four regiments. Then in May 1855, she arrived at Spithead with 131 invalid troops. She had sailed from Balaclava on 12 October, for Scutari. She then sailed from Scutari on 25 February, and Malta on 21 March. Sixteen deaths occurred on the voyage. Later in May Cornwall was in Portsmouth, being surveyed with a view to purchase, to carry 1200 tons of "electric wire tubing" 180 miles across the Mediterranean.

| Year | Master | Owner | Trade | Source |
|---|---|---|---|---|
| 1855 | F.D.King | Luscombe | London transport | LR; small repairs 1847 & 1851 |

== Fate ==
On 14 or 15 July 1858, Cornwall was wrecked at Pointe aux Canonniers, Mauritius. She was on a voyage from Madras to Mauritius. (Note: Hackman misidentifies the location of the wreck as west-south west of Canoniers Point Lighthouse, Brittany.)
