= Leander (1799 ship) =

History

Great Britain
- Name: Leander
- Builder: Thames
- Launched: 1799
- Captured: January 1801

General characteristics
- Tons burthen: 429, or 439 (bm)
- Complement: 45
- Armament: 1799:2 × 9-pounder guns + 24 × 18-pounder carronades; 1800:4 × 12-pounder guns + 22 × 18-pounder carronades

Leander was launched on the Thames in 1799. She was captured in 1801 after she had delivered the captives she had gathered on her first voyage as a slave ship in the triangular trade in enslaved people.

== Career ==
Leander entered Lloyd's List (LR) in 1799 with Anderson, master, Huggins, owner, and trade London–Africa.

Year	Master	Owner	Trade	Source
1800	Anderson	Ewing; Hugham	London–Africa	Register of Shipping

Captain Charles Anderson acquired a letter of marque on 3 December 1799. Captain Christopher Anderson sailed from London on 21 January 1800. Leander acquired her captives at Bonny Island. Leander arrived at Kingston on 10 October with 361 captives. She sailed from Kingston on 29 November.

While she was on her voyage her ownership and intended trade changed.

Year	Master	Owner	Trade	Source
1801	Anderson; C.Brown	T.Huggan; T.Campbell	London–Africa; London–Grenada	LR

== Fate ==
On 17 January 1801 a privateer of 22 guns and 160 men captured Leander, Anderson, master, as she was on her way from Jamaica back to London.

French sources reported that the French privateer Mon Oncle Thomas, of Rochelle, fitted out by Citizen Segaray, had captured the British West Indiaman Leander, of 600 tons and twenty-six 18-pounder carronades, after an action in which the British captain was wounded. Leander was carrying a cargo of coffee, sugar, and indigo, and had an estimated value of Fr.1.5mn. Mon Oncle Thomas brought Leander into Bordeaux.

The entry for Leander in the 1801 volume of LR bears the annotation "Captured".

In 1801, 23 British slave ships were lost; according to the source for this data, none were lost on the way home. However, it was not always clear that a vessel lost on her way back to Britain from the West Indies was a Guineaman that had disembarked her captives. During the period 1793 to 1807, war, rather than maritime hazards or resistance by the captives, was the greatest cause of vessel losses among British slave vessels.
