= Prince Regent (1812 Whitehaven ship) =

UK merchant ship (1811–1839)

History

United Kingdom
- Name: Prince Regent
- Namesake: The Prince Regent
- Launched: 1812, Whitehaven
- Fate: Last listed in 1839

General characteristics
- Tons burthen: 414, or 434, or 437 (bm)

Prince Regent was launched at Whitehaven in 1812. She initially sailed as a West Indiaman. Then from 1817 she made one voyage to India, sailing under a licence from the British East India Company (EIC). Afterwards, she traded across the Atlantic, primarily to the United States. She was last listed in 1839.

== Career ==
Prince Regent first appeared in Lloyd's Register (LR) in 1812.

| Year | Master | Owner | Trade | Source |
|---|---|---|---|---|
| 1812 | Twentyman | Bowen | Whitehaven | LR |

In June 1812, Lloyd's List reported that Prince Regent, Twentyman, master, had been on a voyage from Whitehaven to New Brunswick when she was lost in White Point Bay, Nova Scotia. In October, Lloyd's List reported that Prince Regent, Twentyman, master, had not been lost but rather had been gotten off and had come into Liverpool, Nova Scotia.

| Year | Master | Owner | Trade | Source & notes |
|---|---|---|---|---|
| 1813 | Twentyman | Bowes & Co. | Whitehaven | LR; damages repaired 1813 |
| 1814 | Twentyman; Richmond | Bowes & Co. | Whitehaven; Greenock–Jamaica | LR; damages repaired 1813 |
| 1816 | Richmond; J.Porock | Campbell & Co. | Greenock–Jamaica | LR; damages repaired 1813 |

In 1813 the British East India Company (EIC) had lost its monopoly on the trade between India and Britain. British ships were then free to sail to India or the Indian Ocean under a licence from the EIC.

| Year | Master | Owner | Trade | Source & notes |
|---|---|---|---|---|
| 1818 | Richmond | Campbell & Co. | Greenock–Jamaica; Greenock–Madras | LR; damages repaired 1813 repairs 1817 |

On 27 March 1818, Prince Regent, Richmond, master, sailed for Madras. On 19 April 1819 she was at Colombo when the Southwest monsoon set in. She was using iron cables with the result that the heavy seas caused her to break her windlass. She had arrived there from the Clyde on 2 April. On 25 May she was at Madras. Three days later she sailed for Bengal, which she reached on 11 June. On 10 October she sailed from Madras. On 2 January 1820 Prince Regent was at the Capel. On 23 February, when she was two days south of Scilly, Prince Regent encountered Cornwall; one of the vessels provided the other with provisions. On 10 April 1820 Prince Regent arrived at Liverpool.

| Year | Master | Owner | Trade | Source & notes |
|---|---|---|---|---|
| 1821 | Hepburn; Wright | Campbell & Co. | Greenock–New Orleans | LR; damages repaired 1813 repairs 1817 |
| 1823 | D.Wright; R.Mackie | Campbell & Co. R.Findlay | Greenock–New Orleans | LR; damages repaired 1813 repairs 1817 |
| 1824 | R.Mackie; Bencraft | R.Finlay | Cowes; Liverpool–Jamaica | LR; damages repaired 1813 repairs 1817 |
| 1825 | W.Bencraft | Sanderson & Co. | Liverpool–Jamaica | LR |
| 1826 | J.M'Elven | Sanderson & Co. | Liverpool–New Brunswick | LR |
| 1827 | J.M'Elven; G.Huntley | Sanderson & Co. | Liverpool–New Brunswick | LR |
| 1828 | G.Huntley; M.Scott | Sanderson & Co. | Liverpool–Madeira | LR; new deck & upper wales, & good repair 1828 |

In 1828 Prince Regent, Scott, master, had to put into Kingstown to repair.

| Year | Master | Owner | Trade | Source & notes |
|---|---|---|---|---|
| 1829 | A.M.Scott; J.James | Sanderson & Co. | Liverpool | LR; new deck & upper wales, & good repair 1828 |
| 1830 | J.James | Wilkinson & Co. | Liverpool–Rio de Janeiro | LR; new deck & upper wales, & good repair 1828 |
| 1831 | J.James.Brown | Wilkinson & Co. | Liverpool–Rio de Janeiro | LR; new deck & upper wales, & good repair 1828 |
| 1832 | A.Watkins; T.Hill | M'Neil& Co. | Greenock–Charleston | LR; new deck & upper wales, & good repair 1828 |
| 1833 | T.Hill | M'Neil& Co. | Liverpool–New Orleans | LR; new deck & upper wales, & good repair 1828 |
| 1834 | J.White | | Liverpool | LR |
| 1836 | J.Burt | R.M'Neil | Liverpool–New Orleans; Liverpool–Mobile | LR; new deck, topsides, and large repair 1835, & some repairs 1837 |
| 1837 | J.Burt | R.M'Neil | Liverpool | LR; new deck, topsides, and large repair 1835, some repairs 1837, & damages repaired 1837 |

== Fate ==
Prince Regent, Burt, master, was reported to have returned from Mobile in September 1838. She was last listed in 1839, with data unchanged since 1837.
