= French frigate Loire =

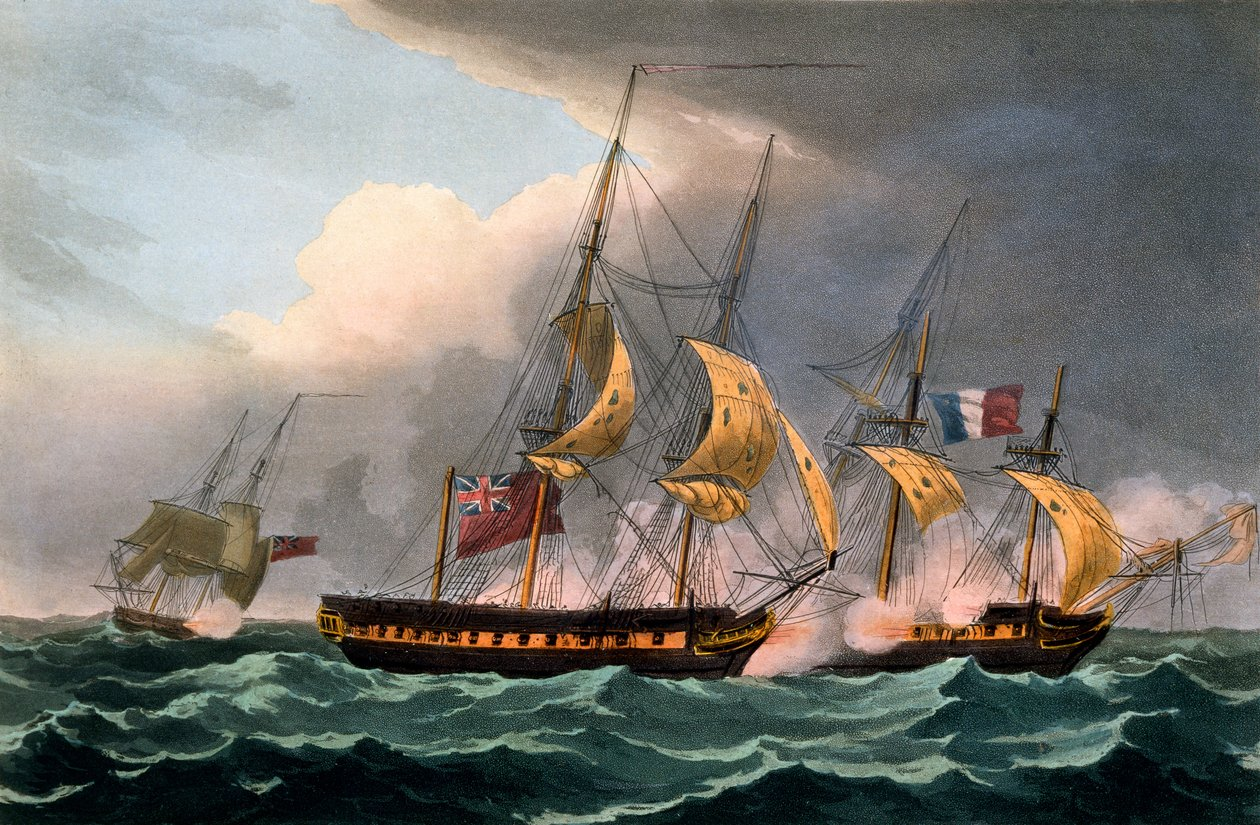
- Loire (first from right) at the action of 18 October 1798

History

France
- Name: Loire
- Builder: Nantes
- Laid down: April 1794
- Launched: 23 March 1796
- In service: December 1797
- Captured: 18 October 1798

Great Britain
- Name: Loire
- Acquired: 18 October 1798 by capture
- Honours and awards: Naval General Service Medal with clasps: "27 June 1803 Boat Service"; "4 June 1805 Boat Service"
- Fate: Broken up in 1818

General characteristics
- Displacement: 1,350 tonneaux
- Tons burthen: 700 port tonneaux
- Length: 46.3 m (151 ft 11 in)
- Beam: 12 m (39 ft 4 in)
- Draught: 5.8 m (19 ft 0 in)
- Propulsion: Sail
- Armament: UD:26 × 18-pounder guns; Spardeck: 12 × 8-pounder guns

Loire was a 38-gun frigate of the French Navy. She was captured following the Battle of Tory Island by a Royal Navy frigate squadron and subsequently taken into British service as HMS Loire.

== French service and capture ==
On 21 December 1797, Captain Louis-Marie Le Gouardun took command, until 22 September 1798.

Loire took part in the Expédition d'Irlande, and in the Battle of Tory Island, where she fought Kangaroo, Robust, and Anson. After the battle, Loire and Sémillante escaped into Black Cod Bay, where they hoped to hide until they had a clear passage back to France. However, late on 15 October, a British frigate squadron under James Newman Newman rounded the southern headland of the bay, forcing the French ships to flee to the north. Pressing on sail in pursuit, Newman ordered Révolutionaire to focus on Sémillante whilst he pursued Loire in Mermaid, accompanied by the brig Kangaroo under Commander Edward Brace. Loire and Sémillante separated to divide their pursuers; Mermaid and Kangaroo lost track of Loire in the early evening, and Sémillante evaded Révolutionaire after dark. Mermaid and Kangaroo eventually found Loire on 17 October, but after an inconclusive fight that left the British unable to pursue, Loire broke off the engagement and escaped. The next day Loire again engaged Kangaroo and Anson, and was forced to strike after she ran out of ammunition. Out of the 664 men, including three artillery regiments and their Etat-Major, carried on board Loire, 48 were killed and 75 wounded. She was also found to be carrying a large store of clothing, weapons, ammunition and tools for her troops' intended operations. Anson had two men killed and 13 wounded, while the Kangaroo appears to have suffered no casualties.

== British service ==
HMS Loire was commissioned by Captain Frederick Lewis Maitland at Portsmouth in October 1802.

On 27 June 1803 Loire's boats captured the French navy brig Venteux while she was anchored close to shore batteries on the Île de Batz. Venteux had a crew of 82 men under the command of lieutenant de vaisseau Gilles-François Montfort and was armed with four 18-pounder guns and six 36-pounder brass carronades. Loire lost her boatswain and five men badly wounded; the French lost their second captain and two men killed, and all five remaining officers, including Montfort, wounded, as well as eight other men wounded. The Royal Navy brought Venteux into service as Eagle, and next year renamed her HMS Eclipse. Lloyd's Patriotic Fund awarded both Lieutenant Francis Temple and Lieutenant James Bowen, who had commanded the boats that had put men on board Venteux an honour sword worth 50guineas, and Midshipman John Priest, whose boat did not arrive in time, an honour sword worth 30 guineas. In 1847 the Admiralty recognized the action with the clasp "27 June Boat Service 1803" to the Naval General Service Medal, awarded to all surviving claimants from the action.

On 17 March 1804 Loire sighted a strange vessel on the Irish station and made all sail in pursuit. She came up with and captured what proved to be the French privateer Braave, of sixteen 12 and 6-pounder guns and 110 men. She had left L'Orient three weeks earlier but had made no captures.

On 16 August 1804 Loire gave chase to a suspicious-looking sail. After a chase of 20 hours, including a running fight of a quarter of an hour, during which the British had one midshipman and five men wounded, and the French lost two men killed and five wounded, the latter hauled down her colours. She proved to be French privateer Blonde, of Bordeaux, mounting 30 guns, eight-pounders on the main deck, with a crew of 240 men under François Aregnaudeau; the same ship that, about five months earlier, had captured the Wolverine. Loire took the prize in tow to Plymouth where the prisoners were disembarked on 31 August.

On 2 June 1805 boats from Loire captured the Spanish privateer felucca Esperanza (alias San Pedro), in the Bay of Camarinas, east of Cape Finisterre. She was armed with three eighteen-pounders, four four-pounder brass swivels and a crew of 50 men. Loire had only three men slightly wounded. The captured Spanish crew had lost 19 of their 50 men, mostly killed by pike and sword; some however had jumped overboard.

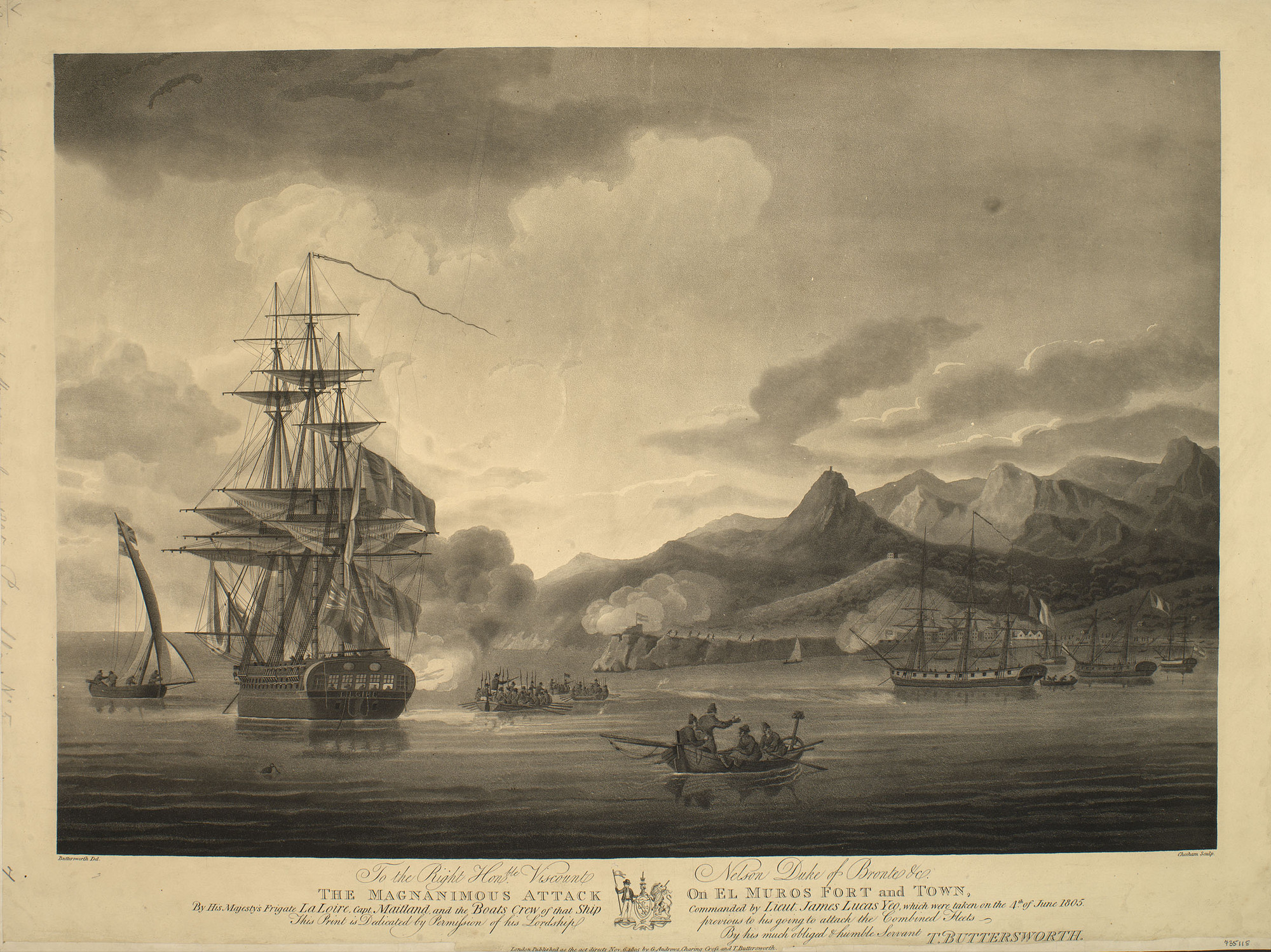
HMS Loire attacks Muros Fort, 4 June 1805, an aquatint by Thomas Buttersworth

On 4 June 1805 Loire made an attack on Muros. Two French privateer vessels were discovered lying in the bay, one of them being Confiance, pierced for 26 guns, 12 and 9-pounders, although not having them on board. A landing party of 50 men from Loire under first lieutenant James Lucas Yeo stormed the town's fort, which was firing its twelve 18-pounder guns at Loire. The landing party killed the fort's commander and many of the defenders, including some crew members from the privateers, and forced the remainder to surrender. Yeo hoisted the British colours, spiked the guns, and rendered the carriages unserviceable. Loire had six men slightly wounded in the shore party (including Yeo), with a further nine injured on the ship, one dangerously so. The Royal Navy took Confiance into service under Yeo's command. Maitland deemed the second vessel, the brig Belier, pierced for twenty 18-pounder carronades, too unseaworthy to carry away and so burnt her. The action led to promotion to Commander for Lieutenant Yeo. Lloyd's Patriotic Fund awarded a sword worth 150 guineas to Maitland, and two swords, each worth 50 guineas, to lieutenants Yeo and Mallock. In 1847 the Admiralty awarded Naval General Service Medal with clasp "4 June Boat Service 1805" to the surviving claimants from the action.

On 25 June Loire had been chasing a French frigate privateer for some twelve hours when Melampus and Brilliant came up and cut-off the quarry, forcing her to surrender. She was the Valiant (or Vaillant), of Bordeaux. She was armed with twenty-four 18-pounder guns on her main deck and six 6-pounders, which she threw overboard while Loire was pursuing her. She had a crew of 240 men. She had been out for 20 days on a four-month cruise but had only captured the Halifax packet Lord Charles Spencer. The Royal Navy took her into service as HMS Barbette.

On 24 December off Rochefort, Loire and Egyptienne captured the 40-gun Libre, Capitaine de Frégate Deschorches commanding. Libre was armed with twenty-four 18-pounders, six 36-pounder carronades and ten 9-pounder guns. In the fight, which lasted half an hour, the French lost 20 men killed and wounded out of a crew of 280 men. Loire had no casualties but Egyptienne had 8 wounded, one mortally. Libre was badly damaged and had lost her masts so Loire took her in tow and reached Plymouth with her on 4 January 1806. Libre had sailed from Flushing on 14 November in company with a French 48-gun frigate but the two vessels had parted in a gale on 9 November off the coast of Scotland. The Admiralty did not purchase Libre into service.

On 22 April 1806, Loire captured the Spanish privateer Princess of Peace, 14 guns, 23 men. Loire was paid off at Deptford in October 1806.

In early 1808, while under command of Alexander Wilmot Schomberg, Loire and the frigate HMS Success (Captain John Ayscough), sailed to Greenland on fishery protection duties, venturing as far as 77° 30' North.

On 21 June 1810 Loire and Erebus escorted 100 vessels through the Great Belt into the Baltic. In September 1812 Loire was escorting the East Indiamen Lord Eldon, Dorsetshire, Scalaby Castle, Batavia, and Cornwall from Saint Helena to England.

In September 1812 Loire was at 14°8′N 28°11′W. She was escorting Cornwall, Dorsetshire, Scaleby Castle, Batavia, and Lord Eldon, which were on their way from Saint Helena to England.

== War of 1812 ==
On 4 December 1813 Ramillies and Loire recaptured the whaler Policy, J.Bowman, master, which the United States Navy had captured in the South Pacific. Her captors sent Policy into Halifax, Nova Scotia.

On 10 December, Loire, commanded by Thomas Smith, captured the Baltimore privateer Rolla, of five guns and 80 men, and less than a day out of port. On 18 February 1814, Loire encountered USS President off New York. Loire escaped once she realized President was a 44-gun frigate. Loire was part of the squadron patrolling the Chesapeake, joining Rear Admiral George Cockburn on 28 April 1814.

Cockburn's Chesapeake squadron, consisting of Albion, Dragon, Loire, Jasseur, and the schooner St Lawrence, took part in a series of raids. After the British failed to destroy the American Chesapeake Bay Flotilla at the Battle of St. Jerome Creek, they conducted a number of coastal raids on the towns of Calverton, Huntingtown, Prince Frederick, Benedict, and Lower Marlborough. On 15 June 1814, a force of 30 Colonial Marines accompanied 180 Royal Marines, all in 12 boats, in a raid on Benedict. Nine days later, on 24 June, a force of 50 Colonial and 180 Royal Marines attacked an artillery battery at Chesconessex Creek, although this proved unsuccessful in preventing the escape of the Chesapeake Bay Flotilla, which departed from St. Leonard's Creek two days later. Five Royal Marine casualties, from the ship's detachment, were suffered during June 1814.

On 7 July, Loire and Severn were ordered to cruise the upper Chesapeake, to harass American boats in general, and to attack a steamboat in particular. Although the steamboat was not intercepted, Loire returned on 14 July with ten prizes in tow. The arrival on 19 July of a battalion of Royal Marines, which had left Bermuda on 30 June, enabled the squadron to mount further expeditions ashore. On the morning of 19 July, the battalion landed near Leonardtown and advanced in concert with ships of the squadron, causing the US forces to withdraw. The battalion was deployed to the south of the Potomac, moving down to Nomini. The battalion subsequently landed at St Clements Bay on 23 July, Machodoc creek on 26 July, and Chaptico, Maryland on 30 July. The first week of August was spent raiding the entrance to the Yeocomico River, which concluded with the capture of four schooners at the town of Kinsale, Virginia. Further casualties were suffered in an engagement on 3 August 1814.

Loire sailed to Halifax, arriving on 24 October 1814. She departed Halifax as part of a convoy and arrived in Plymouth on 12 December 1814.

== Fate ==
On 14 October 1817 the Navy Commissioners gave notice in the London Gazette that the Loire (among other ships), then lying at Plymouth, would be offered for sale at their offices from the 30th. She was eventually broken up in April 1818.
