= Alnwick Packet (1802 ship) =

Smack launched in 1802 in Berwick

History

United Kingdom
- Name: Alnwick Packet
- Namesake: Alnwick
- Builder: Berwick
- Launched: 1802
- Fate: Wrecked 9 November 1825

General characteristics
- Tons burthen: 1802:80, or 8161/94 (bm); 1812 (after lengthening): 103 (bm)
- Sail plan: Smack
- Armament: 6 × 12-pounder carronades

Alnwick Packet (or simply Alnwick) was a smack launched in 1802 in Berwick. She sailed as a coaster and between the United Kingdom and the Continent, and as far as Madeira. In 1809 the British Royal Navy hired her to participate in the ill-fated Walcheren Expedition. Afterwards she returned to her previous trades. She was wrecked on 9 November 1825.

== Career ==
Alnwick first appeared in the Register of Shipping (RS) in 1805.

Year	Master	Owner	Trade	Source
1805	W.Shotten	Alnwick	London coaster	RS
1810	W.Shotten	Alnwick	London coaster	RS

On 15 February 1807 Alnwick Packet, Schotton, master was sailing from London to Alemouth (Alnmouth?) with a valuable cargo. She was in company with a brig from Sunderland. A French privateer with a sloop in company, believed to be her prize, approached. Alnwick Packet was armed with six 12-pounder carronades, courtesy of a government program of arming merchantmen to enable them to protect themselves from French privateers. Captain Shotton had his crew man the carronades, opened his gun ports, and ran his colours up the mast. The French privateer, seeing that Alnwick Packet was prepared to fight, sailed away.

The Royal Navy hired Alnwick Packet on 1 July 1809. She was one of 15 small transports that were hired for the Walcharen Expedition. She is listed as a tender among the vessels stationed at Heligoland on 17 July under the command of Admiral Strachan, the naval commander of the expedition. The Navy returned her to her owners on 3 October. (Note: Although Alnwick Packet was hired for the Expedition, it is not clear whether she and the other 14 vessels, except Berwick Packet, actually participated as they are not listed by name in the prize money notice.)

On 15 April 1812 Alnwick Packet was towed into Bridlington having lost her mast. She was coming from Alemouth.

Year	Master	Owner	Trade	Source & notes
1816	T.Bowness; J.Elder	Pringle & Co.	London coaster	LR; lengthened and thorough repair 1812
1816	Browneys; J.Eider	Alnwick	London–Madeira; London–Rotterdam	RS; lengthened and thorough repair 1812

On 18 December 1817 Alnwick Packet, Adams, master, was driven ashore St. Margaret's Bay, Kent, but it was expected that she would be gotten off. She was on a voyage from Southampton to Newcastle. A later report stated that she had sustained considerable damage.

Year	Master	Owner	Trade	Source
1813	F.Grey	Alnwick	London–Heligoland	RS; lengthened and thorough repair 1812
1825	A.Heatley	Appleby	London coaster	LR; lengthened and thorough repair 1812, and repairs 1823

== Fate ==
Alnwick Packet, Moore, master, foundered on 9 November 1825 in the North Sea off Runton, Norfolk. Her crew and a small part of the cargo were saved, and landed at Sheringham. She was on a voyage from London to Alnwick when she ran into a brig in the night.
