= Belle (1802 ship) =

India–built UK merchant ship 1802–1805

History

United Kingdom
- Name: Belle
- Owner: Samuel Manesty
- Builder: Gilmore & Wilson, Calcutta
- Launched: 1802
- Fate: Captured October 1805

General characteristics
- Tons burthen: 272 (carpenter's measurement), or 281 (bm)
- Propulsion: Sail
- Sail plan: Ship-rigged
- Complement: 40,
- Armament: 8 × 12 + 2 × 42-pounder carronades
- Notes: Teak built.

Belle (or Belle Packet, or Bell) was a brig constructed at Calcutta in 1802. Gilmore and Wilson built her at a cost of Sicca Rupees 50,000. There is a little ambiguity about her purpose. One source states that she was built for the British East India Company (EIC) as a fast-sailing dispatch vessel. The EIC may have used her for that purpose in 1804, but a contemporary account gives her another purpose. The Asiatic Annual Register reported for January 1803 that Gilmore and Wilson had launched "a remarkably beautiful vessel of 272 tons...named the Belle". She was "built purposely for the Bussorah trade, for Samuel Manesty, esq. resident at that place" and her master was to be Alexander Foggo. (Note: Manesty was the British Resident at Basra from 1784 to 1812.)

Captain Alexander Foggo (or Fogo, or Fogge) sailed her from Calcutta on 29 November 1804 for London. She was at Kedgeree on 1 April 1805. She reached Saint Helena on 28 June and arrived at Long Reach on 17 August.

Captain Alexander Fogge acquired a letter of marque on 4 September 1805. The Register of Shipping for 1805 shows A. Fogge as master and owner, and her trade as London–India.

In October 1806 the French Navy's Rochefort squadron captured the "Belle Packet, from London to Bengal", in the Bay of Biscay and took her into La Rochelle. (Note: Belle was on her way to the Mediterranean so that her dispatches could be carried overland to Basra.) She was 10 days out of Portsmouth when the French captured her around the end of October. She had been carrying EIC dispatches and private mail. Foggo apparently succeeded in destroying the dispatches as the correspondence that the French papers published was only of a private nature. (Other accounts give a date of January 1806 for the capture.) The Register of Shipping for 1806 has the notation "captured" by Belle's entry.

== Postscripts ==
In March 1806, Foggo married a Miss Stewart, aged 17, who had been a passenger on Belle when the French captured Belle and carried her into La Rochelle. Miss Stewart was probably Miss Margaret Stuart.

In addition to Miss Stewart, Belle had been carrying to Calcutta eight Anglo-Indian women as passengers. The appropriate assistance from the French State for them generated some discussion. They ranged in age from 24 to 50, three were Catholic and five were Hindu, they were indigent, and they were "coloured women" "devoid of any attachment to a master".
