= Batavia (1802 ship) =

British East Indiaman

History

United Kingdom
- Name: Caroline
- Namesake: Batavia
- Owner: 1802:Hayman; 1810:John William Buckle
- Builder: Robert Davy, Topsham
- Launched: 1802
- Renamed: Batavia
- Fate: Broken up 1819

General characteristics
- Tons burthen: 555, or 55511/94 or 566, or 592, or 600 (bm)
- Length: 125 ft 3 in (38.2 m) (overall); 100 ft 10 3/8 in (30.7 m) (keel)
- Beam: 32 ft 9 in (10.0 m)
- Depth of hold: 12 ft 6 1/2 in (3.8 m)
- Propulsion: Sail
- Complement: 55
- Armament: 1810:2 × 12-pounder guns + 10 × 18-pounders "of the New Construction"; 1810:14 × 18&9-pounder cannons
- Notes: Three decks

Batavia was built at Topsham, England in 1802. At first she traded independently with the East Indies, but then she made three voyages for the British East India Company (EIC). Lastly, she made one voyage in 1818 transporting convicts to Australia. She was broken up in 1819.

== Career ==
Batavia was launched as Caroline, but was renamed shortly after her launch. Batavia entered Lloyd's Register in 1802 with W. Norval, master, Hayman, owner, and trade London–Batavia. Lloyd's Register for 1810 shows Batavia with J. Aitkin, master, changing to Mayne, Hayman, owner, and trade London transport.

=== Voyages to India ===
The EIC had Batavia measured before employing her. She also underwent a thorough repair in 1810. Captain John Mayne acquired a letter of marque on 15 May 1810. He would be Batavia's captain on all three voyages for the EIC.

==== First EIC voyage (1810-1812) ====
Mayne sailed from Portsmouth on 9 June 1810, bound for Ceylon, Bengal, and Batavia. Batavia reached Madeira on 26 June and Colombo on 21 November. She arrived at Calcutta on 19 January 1811. She continued her journey, passing Saugor on 5 March, reaching Penang on 16 April and Malacca on 11 May.

The reason Batavia was at Malacca was that she served as a transport during the British invasion of Java in 1811. She was part of the second division, which sailed from Malacca on 11 June 1811.

Batavia was at Borneo on 21 July, before arriving at Batavia on 4 August. She returned to Malacca on 30 August and Calcutta on 17 December. Homeward bound, she was at Saugor on 7 March 1812, reached Mauritius on 19 May and St Helena on 24 July. In September Lord Eldon, Dorsetshire, Scaleby Castle, Batavia, and Cornwall were at 14°8′N 28°11′W on their way from Saint Helena to England and under escort by HMS Loire. Batavia arrived at Blackwall on 30 October.

==== Second EIC voyage (1813-1814) ====
Mayne sailed from Portsmouth on 20 April 1813, bound for St Helena and Bengal. Batavia reached Madeira on 14 May and St Helena on 22 July. She arrived at Calcutta on 14 November. Bound for England, albeit not directly, she was at Saugor on 19 January 1814 and Ceylon on 13 February. She was at Bombay on 17 March and Tellicheri on 17 April. She stopped at Mauritius on 23 June and was at the Cape on 27 July. She reached St Helena on 5 September. On 13 October she had a skirmish with an American ship, but reached the Wight on 15 November. She arrived at Long Reach on 20 November.

==== Third EIC voyage (1816-1817) ====
Mayne left the Downs on 15 May 1816, bound for Bengal. Batavia reached Madeira on 25 May and Kedgeree on 24 September, and arrived at Calcutta on 10 October. Homeward bound, she was at Saugor on 28 December, Madras on 12 January 1817, and St Helena on 5 May. She arrived at Long Reach on 20 July.

Supposedly, Batavia was then seen as unseaworthy and sold for breaking up.

=== Convict transport ===
Captain William Lamb and surgeon J. Billing sailed from Gravesend, then Plymouth on 11 November 1817, bound for Sydney, New South Wales. Batavia stopped at Madeira leaving on 1 December, arriving on 5 April 1818. She had embarked some 221 male prisoners and disembarked 218 in Sydney. Detachments of the 34th and 46th Regiment of Foot provided the guard detachment.

She left Port Jackson on 3 June 1818 bound for Bombay. Batavia was forced to return to Sydney on 8 July, for repairs.

== Fate ==
On 24 December 1819 Batavia's register was cancelled as demolition was complete.
