= Melville (1802 ship) =

History

United Kingdom
- Name: Melville
- Owner: 1803:Gilmore & Wilson; EIC voyages 1-2:John Innes; EIC voyage 3:Capt Betham; Or:Ferguson & Co.
- Builder: W. Wilson, or J. Gilmore, Calcutta
- Launched: 1802, or 1801
- Renamed: Lady Campbell (prior to 1814)
- Fate: Last listed 1829

General characteristics
- Tons burthen: 676, or 681, or 68155/94, or 684, or 700 (bm)
- Length: Overall:138 ft 0 in (42.1 m); Keel:111 ft 11 in (34.1 m)
- Beam: 33 ft 10 in (10.3 m)
- Depth of hold: 18 ft 0 in (5.5 m)
- Notes: Two decks; teak built

Melville was launched at Calcutta in 1802 and apparently traded as a country ship in the East Indies until 1814. Then she sailed to England under the name Lady Campbell and proceeded to sail between London and India, with three of her voyages being on behalf of the British East India Company (EIC). She is last listed in 1829.

== Career ==
Melville appeared in the East-India register and directory for 1803 with M. Gilmore, master. She then disappeared from online records. She may have served as a country ship in the Indian coastal trades. Still, listings in 1809 of vessels belonging to Calcutta or Bombay did not include her.

At some point her name changed to Lady Campbell. On 26 November 1814 Lady Campbell left India for England. She anchored in Table Bay on 10 February 1815. Lady Campbell, Bennett, master, arrived at Gravesend, Kent on 25 June.

She made three voyages from England as an "extra ship" for the EIC.

EIC voyage #1 (1816-1817): Captain Thomas Marquis sailed from The Downs on 15 May 1816, bound for Bengal. Lady Campbell was at Madeira on 30 May, and reached Kedgeree on 20 September. She arrived at Calcutta on 10 October. Homeward bound, she was at Saugor on 26 January 1817, Vizagapatam on 28 February, and Madras on 6 March. She reached St Helena on 13 June, and arrived at The Downs on 12 August.

lady Campbell entered Lloyd's Register in 1818 with T. Marquis, master and owner, and trade London–India. The entry recorded her place of launch as the Thames, and her launch year as 1816. However, the 1820 volume of Lloyd's Register had corrected her place of launch to Calcutta, and had the notation that she was 16 years old.

EIC voyage #2 (1820-1821): Captain Thomas Marquis sailed from The Downs on 25 April 1820, bound for China. Lady Campbell arrived at Whampoa anchorage on 29 August. Homeward bound, she crossed the Second Bar on 25 December, reached the Cape of Good Hope on 10 March 1821 and St Helena on 31 March, and arrived at The Downs on 26 May.

On 13 March 1823, Lady Campbell, Beetham, master, put into Lorient, having lost her rudder. She was sailing from England to Bengal. A letter dated Lorient 18 April reported that Lady Campbell, bound for the Cape and India, would sail on 28 April, or 1 May at the latest, having received a new rudder and having undergone the necessary repairs.

EIC voyage #3 (1825): Captain Irvine sailed from The Downs on 10 January 1825, bound for Bengal. Lady Campbell arrived at Calcutta on 29 June. A letter from Gibraltar dated 18 June 1825 reported that Lady Campbell, Bentham, master, was coming from Bengal, when she grounded near the Pearl Rock coming into the Hay. She was aground for about an hour but then was got off without apparent damage before any vessels could come to her assistance.

== Fate ==
Lady Campbell made at least one more voyage between London and Bengal, and return via Gibraltar and Cadiz. She was last listed, with stale information, in the 1829 volumes of both Lloyd's Register and the Register of Shipping.
