= Recovery (1802 ship) =

History

United Kingdom
- Name: Recovery
- Launched: 1802, Yarmouth, Nova Scotia
- Fate: Condemned January 1811

General characteristics
- Tons burthen: 174, or 175 (bm)
- Armament: 4 × 4-pounder guns + 8 × 12-pounder carronades

Recovery was launched at Yarmouth, Nova Scotia in 1802. She transferred her registry to Quebec City, Quebec in 1806, and to London in 1807. She traded to the Cape of Good Hope and the West Indies. In January 1812 she was condemned at Nevis after she had sustained damage at sea.

== Career ==
Recovery first appeared in Lloyd's Register (LR) in 1807.

Year	Master	Owner	Trade	Source & notes
1807	Alexander	A.Grigg	London–Cape of Good Hope	LR
1810	Alexander; Clark	A.Grigg	London–Curacoa	LR; thorough repair 1809

She arrived in the Thames on 17 April 1809, having come from Curacoa. On the 14th, off Beachy Head, she had encountered two French privateer luggers, each of about 100 men, and repulsed them after an engagement of an hour and a half.

On 21 October 1809 she was returning to Portsmouth from Corruna when she saw a French privateer lugger capture two merchant vessels off the Isles of Scilly.

Year	Master	Owner	Trade	Source & notes
1811	Clark	A.Grigg	London–Trinidad	LR; thorough repair 1809

== Fate ==
On 19 January 1811 Recovery, Clark, master, sailed from Nevis. She met with considerable damage shortly thereafter and had to put back into Nevis, where she was to unload. She was condemned at Nevis. The volume of LR for 1812 carried the annotation "Condemned".
