= Malta (1807 ship) =

History

United Kingdom
- Launched: 1802, Minorca
- Acquired: 1807
- Fate: Wrecked on 7 March 1818

General characteristics
- Tons burthen: 166 (bm)
- Sail plan: Snow or brig
- Armament: 2 × 4-pounder guns

Malta was built in 1802 at Minorca for Spanish owners, probably under another name. As Malta she enters British records in 1807. She traded with the Mediterranean and then more widely until 1818 when she was wrecked at the Cape of Good Hope (CGH).

== Career ==
Malta first appeared in Lloyd's Register (LR) in 1807.

Year	Master	Owner	Trade	Source
1807	W.Burnet	Smith & Co.	Leith–Malta	LR; damages & good repair 1807
1808	W.Burnet; W.Muckle	Smith & Co.	Leith–Malta	LR; good repair 1807
1811	Muckle	Smith & Co.	Leith–Malta	LR; good repair 1807
1815	W.Muckle; Young	Cassells	Leith–Malta	LR; good repair 1807 & repairs 1815
1816	J.Young	Sibbald & Co.	Leith–Havana	LR; good repair 1807 & repairs 1815
1818	Lindsay	Blackford	London–CGH	LR; good repair 1807 & repairs 1815

== Fate ==
Malta, Lindsay, master, was wrecked on 7 March 1818 outside Table Bay on her way from London. About two-thirds of the cargo was saved.
