= Argo (1804 ship) =

History

United Kingdom
- Name: Argo
- Namesake: Argo
- Acquired: 1804 by purchase of a prize
- Fate: Captured late 1812

General characteristics
- Tons burthen: 221, or 281, or 292, (bm)
- Complement: 1804:25; 1807:40; 1814:28
- Armament: 1804:4 × 9-pounder guns + 6 × 12-pounder guns "of the New Construction"; 1804:18 × 6&12-pounder cannons; 1807:18 × 12&6&4-pounder cannons; 1813:4 × 6-pounder guns + 6 × 12-pounder carronades

Argo was launched in 1802 in France, possibly under another name, and captured c. 1804. She became a privateer and then a whaler. She made two complete whale hunting voyages in the British southern whale fishery. A US Navy frigate captured her on her third whaling voyage.

== Career ==
Argo first appeared in Lloyd's Register (LR) with John Bader, master, Hulet & Co., owners, and trade London–South Seas.

1st whaling voyage (1804–1807): Captain John Bader acquired a letter of marque on 17 August 1804. Captain Bader sailed from Gravesend on 23 October 1804, bound for New South Wales. Argo sailed via Rio de Janeiro and arrived at Port Jackson on 7 January 1805. From there she sailed to the Bay of Islands and the waters off New Zealand. Argo was reported "all well" in October 1805. She returned to Port Jackson and then sailed for England in February 1807. She arrived back in England on 29 September 1807.

Privateer: Captain Edward Hamson acquired a letter of marque on 3 December 1807. The size of Argo's crew suggests that she may have made a cruise as a privateer. On the one hand there is no corroborating SAD data from Lloyd's List. On the other, Lloyd's List reported on 29 March 1808 that the "Argo privateer" had sent into Plymouth Concord, from New Orleans. There is no other contemporary Argo with a letter of marque. In February 1808 called in at Rio de Janeiro.

2nd whaling voyage (1808–1811): Captain Charles Gardner sailed from England on 18 July 1808, bound for Peru. She reached the coast of Chile in 1809 and sailed on to the Galapagos Islands. She was reported "all well" of Peru in July 1809, and February 1810. Argo arrived back at Gravesend on 24 February 1811 with a full cargo of 2500 barrels of whale oil.

Lloyd's Register for 1813 gave the name of Argo's master as Anderson, her owner as Blythe & Co., and her trade as London–South Seas. It is not clear what Argo was doing in the 14 months between her return in 1811 and her departure in 1812 on her third whaling voyage.

3rd whaling voyage (1812–loss): Still, it was Captain J. Walker who sailed from England on 2 April 1812, bound for Peru. While Argo was homeward bound, she fell prey to an American frigate.

On 27 September 1812, Argo had left St Helena with the whalers Admiral Berkeley and Frederick, under escort by HMS Galatea, returning from the Indian Ocean. Frederick separated from the other three ships on 27 October, off Ascension. On 31 October the convoy encountered the USS President and the USS Congress at 33°10′N 20°28′W. The Americans gave chase and Congress captured Argo, but Galatea escaped and arrived at Portsmouth. Berkeley too escaped.

== Fate ==
The frigate Congress captured Argo on 1 November 1813 off the Western Islands and sent her into the United States. Lloyd's List reported on 16 February 1813 that Argo, Walker, master, prize to Congress and President, arrived in Norfolk, Virginia on about 15 December 1813.
