= Imperial (1802 ship) =

History

United Kingdom
- Name: Imperial
- Builder: Simon Temple, South Shields
- Launched: 1802
- Captured: 1804
- Fate: Wrecked 1812
- Notes: (Note: In the relevant period (1802–1812), Imperial is a unique name in Lloyd's Register.)

General characteristics
- Tons burthen: 530, or 531 (bm)
- Complement: 35
- Armament: 6 × 6-pounder guns

Imperial was launched in 1802 by Temple shipbuilders in South Shields. She made one voyage from Liverpool to West Africa to trade between Africa and Liverpool in African goods. While she was acquiring goods, a French privateer captured her in 1804 and took her into Cayenne. Her loss resulted in a court case in which her insurers refused to pay on the grounds that her owners had not fully disclosed their plans. The court agreed with the insurers, ruling that the failure to disclose vitiated the contract. She and an enslaving vessel that the same privateer captured proved to be notably profitable prizes for her captor.

She returned to British ownership and sailed as a West Indiaman. In 1806 a French privateer captured her, but the Royal Navy quickly recaptured her.

== Career ==
Imperial first appeared in Lloyd's Register (LR) in 1803. Although Imperial appears in a database of slave ships engaged in the triangular trade in enslaved people, she was not an enslaving ship.

Imperial had been intended for charter to the British East India Company as an East Indiaman. When that did not occur, her owners decided to send her to Africa to gather dyewood, ivory, bees wax, palm oil, etc. They did not intend her to engage in enslaving.

Year	Master	Owner	Trade	Source
1803	Marshall	Henderson	Liverpool–Africa	LR

What her owners did not reveal to their insurers was that in October 1802, they had sent out a smaller vessel, George, to acquire a cargo for herself, and to contract for one for Imperial. George arrived at Gaboon and acquired a cargo of barwood. She also contracted for barwood for Imperial, which was expected some two months later, and then sailed to the Cameroons and Calabar for ivory, palm oil, and the like.

Imperial sailed in January 1803 and arrived at Gaboon. Imperial, Marshall, master, was reported to have arrived in Africa. She actually arrived on 28 March 1803.

At Gaboon Imperial took on barwood and ivory. While there, there was a mutiny aboard Imperial that resulted in the deaths of several crew members and delayed her.

Imperial then sailed to Calabar and met George there. At Calabar, Imperial transferred her ivory and 30 tons of barwood to George, and took on the outward cargo that George still had on board.

Captain Price, of George, was the more experienced captain, and he replaced Marshall as captain of Imperial. Marshall assumed command of George. Six crew members from George transferred to Imperial.

George then sailed with a full cargo before Imperial commenced her trading. It was this unrevealed co-joined trading that the insurers objected to. They argued that it resulted in Imperial being on the coast of Africa longer than they had anticipated when they set their rates, and so increased their risk.

On 14 January 1804, Imperial had almost completed her cargo when a French privateer captured her.

The next press report was that Imperial, Price, master, had been captured. Lloyd's List reported in July 1804 that "Uncle Toby" had captured Imperial as Imperial was coming from Africa, and had sent Imperial into Cayenne. Imperial, Price, master, appears on a list of vessels reported lost, that did not appear on the lists of vessels cleared out for Africa between 1786 and 1805, from ports in England.

In 1803, 99 British enslaving vessels sailed from British ports. During the period 1793 to 1807, war, rather than maritime hazards or resistance by the captives, was the greatest cause of vessel losses among British enslaving vessels.

Imperial was one of two ships that the French privateer Mon Oncle Thomas captured in 1804. (The other was the enslaving ship Venus.) French sources give the dates of capture as 30 January 1804 for Venus and 17 March for Imperial. At Cayenne, Captain Papin, of Mon Oncle Thomas, sold Venus and Imperial, and their cargoes. Apparently the captives commanded a good price. Some, from one of the two prizes (almost surely Venus), sold for as much as 2,450 francs each; none sold for less than 2,008 francs each. The two prizes resulted in a net gain of Fr.900,000 to the owners of Mon Oncle Thomas.

The court in the insurance case found for the insurers. The insurers had also alleged that George and Imperial had engaged in enslaving, which too would have vitiated their insurance. However, the court ruled that all the evidence indicated that the two vessels had not. (Note: This does not necessarily mean that there were no Africans aboard Imperial. It was a common in trading on the African coast for vessels to accept Africans as pawn, i.e. collateral, during trading. The vessel owner would advance goods to the local trader, taking Africans provided by the trader as collateral, with the trader redeeming the collateral by in time providing captives, or in the case of goods-trading vessels, the trade goods agreed upon. Pawn were legally not considered as chattel, though it is not clear if the distinction would have survived Imperial's capture and their arrival at Cayenne.)

== Merchantman ==
Imperial returned to British ownership.

Year	Master	Owner	Trade	Source & notes
1805	W.Peterkin; H.Galt	Wilson & Co. Fletcher & Co.	Cork; Liverpool–Jamaica	LR

In November 1804, Imperial, Peterkin, master, arrived at Cork from Baltimore.

In July 1806, Lloyd's List reported that a French privateer had captured Imperial, Galt, master, as she was sailing from Jamaica Liverpool. The privateer had also captured Sarah, of Jamaica. HMS Atlas recaptured both, and it was believed that Echo was escorting the two recaptures to Jamaica. They arrived at Port Royal on 6 May.

Year	Master	Owner	Trade	Source & notes
1808	H.Galt; W.Irving	Fletcher & Co.	Liverpool–Jamaica; Liverpool–Stockholm	LR
1810	W.Irving	Fletcher & Co.	Liverpool–Martinique	LR; repairs 1809
1811	G.Harding	Fletcher & Co.	Liverpool–Jamaica	LR; repairs 1809

== Loss ==
Imperial, Harding, master, was totally lost in 1812 on Sable Island. She was on here way from Liverpool to New Brunswick. The crew and materials were saved.
