= Lord Eldon (1802 EIC ship) =

History

United Kingdom
- Name: Lord Eldon
- Namesake: Lord Eldon
- Owner: EIC Voy. 1-2: Moses Agar; EIC Voy. 4-6: Richardson Borradaile; Convict transport: Buckle & Co.
- Operator: British East India Company
- Builder: Temple shipbuilders, South Shields
- Launched: 1802
- Fate: Last listed in 1819

General characteristics
- Tons burthen: 538, or 571, 57153/94, 578, or 583 (bm)
- Length: 123 ft 0 in (37.5 m) (overall); 99 ft 7 1/2 in (30.4 m) (keel)
- Beam: 31 ft 10 1/2 in (9.7 m)
- Depth of hold: 14 ft 8 in (4.5 m)
- Propulsion: Sail
- Complement: 55
- Armament: 16 × 12-pounder guns

Lord Eldon was a two-decker East Indiaman, launched in 1802 at South Shields, that made seven voyages as an "extra ship" i.e., under charter, for the British East India Company (EIC). Subsequently, she made one voyage to New South Wales transporting convicts. She was last listed in 1819.

== Indiaman ==
Moses Agar contracted with the EIC for Lord Eldon to make six voyages for a per ton freight charge of £13 19s 6d per ton (in peacetime). Only her first voyage for the EIC would take place in peacetime.

=== EIC voyage #1 (1802-03) ===
Captain Jasper Swete left the Downs 14 June 1802, bound for St Helena and Bengal. (Note: Swete’s name often shows up in records as "Sweet".) Lord Eldon sailed in company with Minerva. The Directors of the EIC had ordered Minerva's captain to travel with Lord Eldon, something that annoyed him as the French Revolutionary Wars had ended and so he didn’t need the reinforcements, and Lord Eldon was particularly slow.

Lord Eldon reached St Helena on 30 August, the Cape on 20 October, and Acheh on 7 January 1803. She arrived at Calcutta on 31 January. She brought detachments of the 8th Dragoons and the 22nd Regiment of Foot, which were transferring to India from the Cape.

For here homeward leg she passed Kedgeree on 20 April, reaching St Helena on 9 August and Cork, Ireland, on 1 December. Lord Eldon arrived at the Downs on 12 December.

=== EIC voyage #2 (1804-05) ===
Captain Jasper Swete left Portsmouth on 9 June 1804, bound for Bengal and Benkulen. By this time the Napoleonic Wars had broken out and after Swete had left Portsmouth he was issued a letter of marque on 25 June. (Note: The letter is in the name of Jasper Suerte, but this may be a transcription error, or a clerical error due to Swete having already left. Indiamen generally travelled under letters of marque during wartime. What is uncommon is not that Swete received a letter but that his successors on Lord Eldon appear not to have bothered with them.) The letter of marque authorized him to engage in offensive action against the French should the occasion arise, not just defensive action against them or pirates. Lord Eldon reached Madeira on 6 July and arrived at Calcutta on 21 December.

Hoomeward-bound, she passed Saugor on 31 March 1805, reached Benkulen on 17 May, and St Helena on 6 September. She arrived at the Downs on 6 December.

On her arrival in England, Lord Eldon reported that she, the Indiaman Tottenham, and three whalers had left St Helena under escort by the gun-brig HMS Urgent when in the vicinity of 41°42′N 30°43′E they sighted three frigates and a brig, which they believed were Spanish. The enemy vessels, Spain being a French ally at that time, chased them from 9a.m. to 8p.m. Her travails were not over, however. On 16 December The Times reported that two days earlier, Lord Eldon, with a cargo of pepper from Benkulen, Sumatra, had stuck on the sands at the Nore, and could not be got off.

=== EIC voyage #3 (1806-07) ===
Captain John William Young left Portsmouth on 10 June 1806, bound for Bengal. Lord Eldon arrived at Calcutta on 20 November.

Homeward bound, she passed Saugor on 26 March 1807, and reached St Helena on 31 July.

Early in the morning of 9 November, Lord Eldon was anchored off the Needles, and almost home. A brig approached her in the dark and the fog; seeing her, the crew fled below deck as they feared she was an English naval vessel come to try and press them. Actually, the brig was a French privateer, and the lack of a deck crew made it easy for the privateer’s men to board. Captain Young heard unusual sounds, went on deck, and raised the alarm. The crew returned to the deck and killed five privateers. Young himself then with a single blow of his sword, beheaded one man who was at the helm, who turned out to be the privateer’s boatswain. In the confusion the privateer escaped.

=== EIC voyage #4 (1808-09) ===
Young left Portsmouth on 10 June 1808, bound for Bombay. Lord Eldon reached Madeira on 25 June.

On 10 October, Lord Eldon and the Indiaman Caermarthen were about six leagues from the island of Cortivy. They estimated her position as 7°20′S 56°20′E. (The actual coordinates are 7°8′S 56°20′E.) The significance of the estimation, rough as it was, still located the island several miles southwest of where it had until then been believed to be.

Lord Eldon arrived at Bombay on 30 October. That day, HMS Nereide came up and pressed four seamen; a fifth jumped into the sea and swam ashore.

Homeward bound, Lord Eldon reached Point de Galle on 8 February 1809. On 15 February she sailed from Point de Galle as part of a fleet of 15 East Indiamen under escort by HMS Culloden and HMS Terpsichore.

On 14 March, off Mauritius, a gale developed. Four of the ships, Bengal, Calcutta, Jane, Duchess of Gordon, and Lady Jane Dundas, parted company with the main convoy. They were never heard of again. Huddart was the last to vessel to see Bengal and Calcutta; Hugh Inglis was the last vessel to see Jane, Duchess of Gordon and Lady Jane Dundas. The hull of one of the four missing vessels was sighted overturned off Mauritius the following October, but sank before it could be identified.

Lord Eldon reached St Helena on 29 April. She arrived at the Downs on 13 July.

=== EIC voyage #5 (1810-12) ===
Young left Portsmouth on 12 May 1810 bound for Bombay and. Lord Eldon reached Madeira on 27 May and Bombay on 5 October. Lord Eldon reached Calicut on 24 November and Point de Galle on 4 December, and arrived at Calcutta on 25 January 1811. She left Calcutta, passing Saugor on 4 March, reaching Malacca on 7 June.

The reason Batavia was at Malacca was that she served as a transport during the British invasion of Java in 1811. She was part of the third division, which sailed from Malacca on 14 June 1811.

Lord Eldon was at Batavia on 10 August. She returned via Malacca on 19 October, Penang on 1 November, and on 20 December arrived at Calcutta again.

For her homeward trip, Lord Eldon passed Saugor on 8 March 1812, reaching Mauritius on 19 May, and St Helena on 2 June. In September Lord Eldon, Dorsetshire, Scaleby Castle, Batavia, and Cornwall were at 14°8′N 28°11′W on their way from Saint Helena to England and under escort by HMS Loire. Lord Eldon arrived at the Downs on 24 October.

On her return voyage she had brought with her two head of cattle, a third having died on the voyage. One was an 18-month old heifer, a "Braminico", or "true Bengal breed". The governor of Mauritius put her on board at the behest of Lord Minto, as a gift for the Prince Regent. The other bovine was a bull of the same breed, a present for a Colonel Herriot.

=== EIC voyage #6 (1813-14) ===
Captain Jacob Cowles left Torbay on 25 March 1813, bound for Batavia. Lord Eldon reached Madeira on 8 April and arrived at Batavia on 2 August.

Homeward bound, she reached Anger on 27 October and St Helena on 13 January 1814. She arrived at the Downs on 18 May.

=== EIC voyage #7 (1815-16) ===
Captain Jacob Cowles left the Downs on 3 April 1815, bound for Madras and Bengal. She reached Madeira on 18 April and Madras on 6 August. She arrived at Calcutta on 8 September.

Homeward bound, Lord Eldon passed Saugor on 26 November. She reached Madras again on 30 December, Benkulen on 30 January 1816, and St Helena on 8 May. She arrived at the Downs on 2 July.

== Convict transport ==
At some point after her return, Buckle and Co. bought Lord Eldon. Apparently she was sold for use as a hulk, but instead transported convicts to Australia. She appears in Lloyd's Register for 1818 with Lamb, master, and her trade London-Botany Bay. (Note: Lamb was the brother of John Lamb, who made two voyages transporting convicts on Baring, also a Buckle-owned ship, after having been made redundant in the Royal Navy in 1815.)

Actually, she had sailed from Britain on 9 April 1817. Her master was James Thomas Lamb and he sailed her to Port Jackson via Madeira and Rio de Janeiro. On 7 May, as Lord Eldon was at 14°N 38°W while on her way from London to New South Wales, a privateer schooner full of men and armed with long 18 or 24-pounder guns, fired on her. She arrived at Port Jackson on 30 September.

Lord Eldon had sailed with 220 male convicts and arrived with 215, one having escaped at Rio by jumping overboard and swimming to shore, and four having died on the voyage. The 46th Regiment of Foot provided a guard of 30 men, under the command of a lieutenant from the 1st Regiment of Foot.

Lord Eldon left in December 1817, with destination Batavia.

When Lamb and Lord Eldon returned to Britain in 1819, Buckle & Co. gave him command of their new, 435 ton (bm) Indiaman Hoogly.

== Fate ==
Lord Eldon is last listed in 1819 in both Lloyd's Register and the Register of Shipping.
