= Tottenham (1802 Indiaman) =

History

United Kingdom
- Name: Tottenham
- Owner: 1802:Sir Robert Wigram; 1818:Richardson
- Operator: British East India Company
- Builder: Thomas Haw, Stockton-on-Tees
- Launched: 19 April 1802
- Fate: Sold for a transport 1814

United Kingdom
- Name: Tottenham
- Fate: Sold for breaking up 1820

General characteristics
- Tons burthen: 517, or 520, or 534, or 53480/94, or 577 (bm)
- Length: 124 ft 4 1/2 in (37.9 m) (overall); 100 ft 3 in (30.6 m) (keel)
- Beam: 31 ft 2 in (9.5 m)
- Depth of hold: 14 ft 10 in (4.5 m)
- Complement: 1803+:50; 1812:65
- Armament: 16 × 12-pounder guns (1803+ & 1812)

Tottenham was launched in 1802 and made six voyages for the British East India Company (EIC). Her owners then sold her and she became a transport. She made one voyage transporting convicts to Botany Bay. She was sold in 1820 for breaking up.

== EIC voyages ==
=== EIC Voyage #1 (1802-1803) ===
Captain Thomas Jones sailed Tottenham for Bengal, leaving the Downs on 7 July 1802. He reached the Cape of Good Hope on 4 October, and arrived at Calcutta on 6 February 1803. She left Bengal on 18 May, and reached St Helena on 8 September. While Jones was still on his way home, he received a letter of marque on 15 November 1803. Tottenham arrived in The Downs on 13 December.

=== EIC Voyage #2 (1804-1805) ===
Captain James Dalrymple acquired a letter of marque on 1 June 1804. He sailed Tottenham from Portsmouth on 9 June, bound for Madeira, Bengal, and Benkulen. She reached Madeira on 5 July, and arrived at Diamond Harbour on 17 December. She left Bengal on 1 April 1805 and arrived at Bencoolen on 17 May. Homeward-bound, she reached St Helena on 6 September, and arrived at The Downs on 6 December.

Tottenham, the Indiaman Lord Eldon, and three whalers had left St Helena under escort by the gun-brig HMS Urgent when in the vicinity of 41°42′N 30°43′E they sighted three frigates and a brig, which they believed were Spanish. The enemy vessels, Spain being a French ally at that time, chased them from 9a.m. to 8p.m.

=== EIC Voyage #3 (1806-1808) ===
Captain Thomas Jones acquired a letter of marque on 21 March 1806. He sailed from Portsmouth on 10 June, bound for Madras and Bengal. Tottenham reached Madeira on 27 June, the Cape on 3 October, and Madras on 21 December, and arrived at Saugor on 4 February 1807. She left Bengal on 25 March, returned to Madras on 13 April, and returned to Diamond Harbour on 5 June. Homeward bound, she left Bengal on 10 October, was at Madras on 22 October, and reached the Cape on 30 December and St Helena on 25 January 1808. She arrived at The Downs on 4 April.

=== EIC Voyage #4 (1808-1810) ===
Captain Henry Hughes acquired a letter of marque on 30 July 1808. He sailed Tottenham from Portsmouth on 17 September, bound for Madras and Bengal. She reached Madeira on 28 September, and Madras on 11 February 1809, before arriving at Calcutta on 23 March. On 4 July she was at Diamond Harbour, and on 1 August at Kidderpore. Homeward bound, she passed Saugor on 21 December, reached Madras on 2 January 1810, the Cape on 11 March, and St Helena on 27 April. She arrived back at The Downs on 3 July.

=== EIC Voyage #5 (1811-1812) ===
Captain John Barnet Sotheby received a letter of marque against the United States after she sailed from Torbay on 30 May 1811. Tottenham reached Madeira on 22 June, and arrived at Calcutta on 28 November. She left Bengal on 19 March 1812, reached St Helena on 2 July, and arrived at The Downs on 14 September.

=== EIC Voyage #6 (1813-1814) ===
Captain Sotheby left Portsmouth on 20 April 1813 on Tottenham's last voyage under charter to the EIC. They reached Madeira on 14 May and Madras on 5 September, before arriving at Calcutta on 3 November. Homeward bound, she passed Saugor on 21 February 1814, reached the Cape on 24 April and St Helena on 19 May, and arrived at The Downs on 6 August.

== Convict transport ==
At some point Wigram sold Tottenham. She reappeared in the Register of Shipping in 1818 with Lamb, master, Robinson, owner, and trade London-Botany Bay. She also appeared in Lloyd's Register (LR).

Year	Master	Owner	Trade	Source & notes
1818	W.Lamb	Livie & Co.	London–India	LR; damages and good repair 1817

She left England on 17 April 1818 and arrived at Port Jackson on 14 October. She had embarked 200 male convicts, of whom 10 died en route. She returned via Bengal and Madras, under the command of Captain Davy, arriving back in England on 30 March 1820. Her owners then sold her for breaking up.
