= Thomas Henchman (1802 ship) =

United Kingdom
- Name: Thomas Henchman
- Owner: 1803:Archer & Smith; 1809:Forbes & Co.
- Builder: M. Smith, Howrah, Calcutta
- Launched: 1802
- Fate: Wrecked July 1811

General characteristics
- Tons burthen: 500, or 517, or 520, or 600 (bm)

Thomas Henchman was launched in 1802 at Calcutta as a "country ship", that is, a merchant vessel trading in the East Indies, but not between India and England. She was wrecked in 1811 while preparing to participate in a British invasion of Java.

In 1809 William Hodges was captain of Thomas Henchman.

Thomas Henchman was to participate as one of the transports in the British reduction of Java, under the auspices of Lord Minto.

Thomas Henchman was burned, or wrecked on a reef in the Strait of Malacca in July 1811.
