= Frederick (1805 ship) =

History

United Kingdom
- Name: Frederick
- Port of registry: London
- Launched: 1805, America
- Fate: Last listed in 1822

General characteristics
- Tons burthen: 239, or 240 (bm)
- Propulsion: Sail
- Complement: 1805:40; 1810:25; 1810:32
- Armament: 1805: 2 × 6-pounder guns + 16 × 9-pounder carronades; 1810: 16 × 9-pounder carronades; 1815: 8 × 9-pounder carronades

Frederick was an American-built ship that the British captured from the French c.1805. Lumley & Co. purchased her in prize and employed her for two voyages as a slave-ship in the triangular trade in enslaved people. After the abolition of the British slave trade in 1807, she briefly became a merchantman, and then in 1810, a whaler. She made several voyages to the Southern Whale Fishery. On one of these voyages, in 1812, a French privateer captured Frederick but the British Royal Navy captured the privateer, and recaptured Frederick. She is last listed in 1822.

== Slaver ==
Frederick enters Lloyd's Register in the Supplemental pages in 1805, with M'Donald, master, Thomas Lumley, owner, and trade London-Africa.

Captain James MacDonald received a letter of marque on 3 September 1805. He then sailed Frederick on two enslaving voyages.

1st voyage transporting enslaved people (1805–1806): On 16 September 1805, MacDonald sailed to the Gold Coast to acquire captives. On 16 March 1806, Frederick sailed from Africa. While she had been gathering her captives she was attacked from shore. She delivered her captives to British Guiana, where she arrived on 16 May; she arrived with 249 and she disembarked 245.

Captain MacDonald had traded 853 firearms for 343 captives, or almost 2.5 guns per captive. Accepting 343 as the number of captives acquired, and 245 as the number disembarked, gives a mortality rate for the voyage of 29%.

On his return to London, M'Donald reported that some 25 Guineamen had been captured on the Coast, together with HMS Favourite.

2nd voyage transporting enslaved people (1807–1808): The next year he sailed to the Bight of Benin, leaving London on 1 January 1807. Frederick acquired captives at Lagos/Onim. After Frederick left Lagos she stopped at Príncipe. From there she delivered the captives to Kingston, Jamaica, where she arrived on 29 July, with 242 captives; she disembarked 238. She left Kingston on 18 November, and arrived back at London on 4 February 1808.

After the abolition of the slave trade, Frederick began trading with the Brazils. Then in late 1809, Lumley sold her to W. Wilson. Her trade changed from London-Curacoa to London-South Seas fisheries, and her master changed from M'Donald to A. Bodie.

== Whaler ==
Daniel and William Bennett then purchased Frederick.

Captain Alexander Bodie received a letter of marque on 28 April 1810. He sailed Frederick from Britain on 26 May. She arrived at Port Jackson on 21 October, with merchandise, having called in at Rio de Janeiro on the way.

Frederick then left Port Jackson 30 November for the "sperm fishery". The fishing grounds were off the Derwent River of Van Diemen's Land.

Frederick, E. Bunker, master, returned to Port Jackson on 20 August 1811, from the fishery, with 55 tons of sperm oil for the London market. She left for the fishery again on 9 October, in ballast and again under Alexander Bodie's command.

On 27 September 1812, Frederick left St Helena with the whalers Admiral Berkley and Argo, under escort by HMS Galatea, returning from the Indian Ocean. Frederick separated from the other three ships on 27 October, off Ascension. On 31 October, the convoy encountered the USS President and the USS Congress at 33°10′N 20°28′W. The United States frigates gave chase. Congress captured Argo, but Galatea escaped and arrived at Portsmouth.

However, Frederick next encountered the French 14-gun privateer Sans Souci, J. Rossi (or Rosse), master, from Saint-Malo, which captured Frederick. Some nine days later, on 10 December, HMS Briton and HMS Andromache captured Sans Souci, which had most of Frederick's crew aboard. On 19 December, HMS Rolla recaptured Frederick. San Souci arrived at Plymouth on 20 December. Lloyd's List described her as being of 16 guns and having a crew of 70. It further reported that Andromache and Briton had chased Sans Souci for 12 hours before catching her. Sans Souci had only captured Frederick after an hour-long engagement in which Frederick lost her mate killed, and had "Body" and three or four other crew severely wounded. (Note: Sans Souci had been commissioned in October 1812. According to French records, under François Rosse she cruised from October to December 1812, with 100 and 120 men, and four 6-pounders and four 6-pounder carronades.) Lloyd's List reported that Rolla had recaptured Frederick, "late Bodie," on 11 December, at 48°6′N 12°10′W, and that she had arrived at Lisbon on 22 December, with damage to her masts and sails, and in a leaky state. The Register of Shipping (1813) had the notation "CAPTURED" by Frederick's name. Rolla shared the salvage money for Frederick with HMS Dublin and Inconstant.

Frederick returned to Britain on 22 June 1813, with 450 casks of oil. One record has her captain as "Hammond", and her owner as William and Daniel Bennett. However, Lloyd's Register for both 1813 and 1814, has her master as A. Brodie, changing to J. or Wm. Allen, but her owner as W. Wilson.

From 1815 on, both Lloyd's Register and the Register of Shipping have the same entry for Frederick through 1822: J. Allen, master, William & Daniel Bennett, owners, and trade London-South Seas fisheries.

The last detailed report of a whaling voyage has Frederick leaving Britain on 30 September 1816, and returning on 11 November 1817.

== Fate ==
Frederick was broken up in 1821, and is no longer listed after 1822.
