= Vigilant (1783 ship) =

British merchant and slave ship (1780–1786)

History

Great Britain
- Name: Alfred
- Launched: 1780, Sunderland
- Renamed: Vigilant (1783)
- Captured: 1786
- Fate: Lost 1786

General characteristics
- Tons burthen: 280 (bm)

Vigilant was launched in 1780 at Sunderland as Alfred but in 1783 new owners renamed her. She became a West Indiaman and then a slave ship in the triangular trade in enslaved people. As she was gathering slaves on the coast of Africa the slaves on board captured her and ran her aground, a relatively rare instance of a shipboard insurrection, and a successful one at that.

== Career ==
Alfred first appeared in Lloyd's Register (LR) in 1783.

Year	Master	Owner	Trade	Source
1783	R.Kellock	E.Askell	Stockholm–Hull	LR

In 1783 new owners renamed Alfred Vigilant.

Year	Master	Owner	Trade	Source
1784	Barnwell	A.Calvert	London–New York	LR
1786	J.Duncan	A.Calvert	London–Barbados	LR

Slave voyage and loss: Captain J. Duncan sailed from London on 28 March 1786. In October Lloyd's List reported that the Vigilant was at Assamaboe when the enslaved people on board took her over, killed Duncan and the second mate, and ran her ashore.

The 1787 volume of Lloyd's Register carried the annotation "Lost" under her name.

The revolt is one of 493 that appear in a chronology of slave revolts between 1509 and 1865, but with no additional information. Inikori too listed the revolt on Vigilant, with the same information. He also found that of 186 vessels lost to shipwrecks, slave insurrections and attacks by coastal natives, 79 were lost to insurrection and conflict with coastal Africans. Behrendt, in his study of captains in the British slave trade between 1785 and 1807, focused on captains from Liverpool and Bristol. Duncan, therefore, did not enter the study. Still, Behrendt found that although 214 captains died, amounting to 27% of all captains in the trade, only three, or about 1% of the deaths, were due to slave uprisings. Richardson, in his study of slave revolts, found a relatively high incidence of shipboard slave revolts in Senegambia and Upper Guinea, and a generally lower incidence of revolts on ships in the Gold Coast, Bight of Benin, Bight of Biafra, and West Central Africa. All of this suggests that Vigilant's fate, though not unique, was relatively rare.
