= Pritzler (1794 ship) =

Whaling ship

History

Great Britain
- Name: Pritzler
- Acquired: 1794
- Fate: Wrecked January 1798

General characteristics
- Tons burthen: 212 (bm)
- Complement: 12
- Armament: 10 × 6-pounder guns

Pritzler was built in the United States and came to Great Britain in 1794, or slightly earlier. Between 1796 and 1798 she made a voyage as a whaling ship for Daniel Bennett & Son. She was lost in January 1798 as she was returning from this voyage.

On 22 February 1794 Captain Christopher Foster acquired a letter of marque. However, Pritzler first appeared in Lloyd's Register (LR) in 1795 with J.Harpley, master, Pritzler, owner, and trade West Indies to Cork. She had undergone a thorough repair in 1794.

In 1795 Admiral Hugh Cloberry Christian mounted and expedition to the West Indies. The expedition sailed on 6 October, 16 November, and 9 December, but weather forced the vessels to put back. The fleet finally successfully sailed on 20 March 1796 to invade St Lucia, with troops under Lieutenant-General Sir Ralph Abercromby. St Lucia surrendered to the British on 25 May. The British went on to capture Saint Vincent and Grenada. Pritzler, Mahon, master, was among the vessels in Admiral Christian's convoy for the West Indies, but her destination was St.Domingo and Jamaica.

| Year | Master | Owner | Trade | Source |
|---|---|---|---|---|
| 1796 | J.Harpley; M'Gowan | T.Pritzler; Bennett | West Indies–Cork; London–South Seas | LR; thorough repair 1794 |

In 1796 the shipowner Daniel Bennet purchased Pritzler for use as a whaler.

On 9 June 1796 Pritzler, M'Gowen, master, was at Deal, waiting to sail to the South Seas; she sailed the next day. The Bennet-owned whaler "Prosteler", Anthony Pavuen, master, was reported to have called in at Rio de Janeiro in December for water and refreshments. Pritzler and Prosteler are probably the same vessel as there is no Prosteler in Lloyd's Register. Pritzler was reported to have been at Delagoa Bay in 1798. By one account she returned to England on 28 November 1797. However, LL reported on 9 January 1798 that as she was returning from the South Seas and Saint Helena she was lost near Beachy Head. Her captain was lost too.
