= Carleton (1802 ship) =

British ship launched in Canada

History

United Kingdom
- Owner: Humble & Co. (1806–1807)
- Builder: New Brunswick or Nova Scotia
- Launched: 1802
- Fate: Wrecked circa September 1809

General characteristics
- Tons burthen: 280, or 315, or 327 (bm)
- Complement: 1804:40; 1808:30
- Armament: 1804: 18 × 12-pounder cannons; 1806:6 × 6-pounder gun + 14 × 12-pounder carronades; 1808: 14 × 12&6-pounder cannons, or 6 × 9-pounder gun + 14 × 12-pounder carronades

Carleton (or Carlton) was launched in New Brunswick or Nova Scotia in 1802. First she traded between Liverpool and North America. Then between 1806 and 1807 she made one voyage as a whaler to Van Diemen's Land. Afterwards she traded with the Caribbean and Malta, and was lost while sailing from Hull to Quebec.

== Career ==
Carleton first appeared in Lloyd's Register (LR) in 1802.

Year	Master	Owner	Trade	Source
1802	Kellener	Thorn & Co.	Liverpool–Virginia	LR
1804	Kellener	Holland	Liverpool–Newfoundland; Liverpool–Halifax	LR
1805	Kellener; Halerno	Holland	Liverpool–Halifax; Liverpool–Southern Fishery	LR

Captain Sinclair Halcrow acquired a letter of marque on 11 December 1804.

Whaling voyage (1805–1807): Captain Halcrow sailed for the New South Wales Whale Fishery in 1805. In September 1805 Carleton, of Liverpool, was reported in England to have been at the River Plate earlier that year. By February 1806 or so Carlton was "all well" around Cape Horn. By July 1806 Carleton, "Malcrow", master, was at Van Diemen's Land. While at Hobart, Halcrow and Carlton went whaling in the Derwent. (Note: While there, Halcrow met often with the Reverend Robert Knopwood. Knopwood's journal has many mentions of meals and walks with Halcrow, and of whales taken in the Derwent.) Carlton sailed from Hobart on 4 September with Captain and Mrs. Sladden from Hobart as passengers, Captain Sladden having been recalled to join his division at Chatham.

Carleton was at Saint Helena on 15 December 1806, from the South Seas, and sailed again on the 28th. She arrived back at Liverpool on 18 February 1807.

Year	Master	Owner	Trade	Source
1808	S.Halerno; J.Clint	Holland	Liverpool–Southern Fishery; Liverpool–Hayti	LR; damages repaired 1808

Captain John Clint acquired a letter of marque on 24 May 1808. Captain Clint had already sailed to St Domingo, having returned to Liverpool on 23 April 1808 with 573 bales and 330 bags of cotton. He then sailed to Haiti. After sailing to Haiti, Carlton, Clint, master, sailed to Malta from Haiti. From Malta Carlton returned to Plymouth.

Year	Master	Owner	Trade	Source
1810	Prondoe	Featherstone	Hull-Lubeck	LR; damages repaired 1808
1810	Proudlove	Holland	Liverpool–Hayti	Register of Shipping; damages repaired 1808 & small repairs 1804

== Fate ==
Then on 17 September 1809, Carlton, Proudlove, master, was at the Gulf of St Lawrence. The next report was that Carlton, Proudlove, from Hull to Quebec, was believed lost on the Banks of Newfoundland. Her entry in the 1810 issue of the Register of Shipping (RS) carried the annotation "LOST".
