= Vigilant (1802 ship) =

History

United Kingdom
- Name: Vigilant
- Captured: May 1806

General characteristics
- Tons burthen: 194, or 199 (bm)
- Armament: 10 × 6-pounder guns
- Notes: Clinker-built

Vigilant was built in Britain, but the date and place of her launching are obscure. Vigilant first appeared in Lloyd's Register (LR) in 1802, having undergone a repair in that year, which suggests that she may have been launched some years earlier under another name. She made one complete voyage as a whaler to the British Southern Whale Fishery, and was captured in the Pacific on her second whaling voyage.

Year	Master	Owner	Trade	Source
1802	Williams	H.Roper	London–Southern Fishery	LR

Vigilant was valued at £4200 in November 1802.

1st whaling voyage (1802–1805): Vigilant, Williams, master, sailed from Falmouth on 26 November 1802, bound for the South Seas. Vigilant, Williams, master, arrived at Rio de Janeiro at the end of October 1804. A heavy gale had carried away her topmast and caused her to spring a leak. She arrived back at Gravesend on 17 February 1805, with oil and skins from Patagonia.

Year	Master	Owner	Trade	Source
1805	T.Gay	Price	London–Southern Fishery	LR

2nd whaling voyage (1805–Loss): On 28 October 1805 Vigilant, T.Gay, master, sailed from London, bound for Peru and the Galapagos Islands.

In October 1807 Lloyd's List reported that Vigilant, Gay, master, had been taken around Cape Horn (i.e., in the Pacific ocean) in November 1806.

In May 1806 the Spanish privateer San Gabriel had captured Vigilant. Vigilant arrived at Callao in March 1807, in the interim having captured on 30 June the Guayaquil polacre Monserrat, five of whose crew later overpowered the prize crew on Vigilant, killed her captain, and took her into Tumaco, where they joined a convoy to Callao.
