= Venus (1815 ship) =

History

United Kingdom
- Name: Venus
- Builder: France
- Launched: 1802
- In service: 1815
- Fate: Last listed in 1838

General characteristics
- Tons burthen: 287, or 288 or 289 (bm)
- Sail plan: Barque

Venus was launched in France in 1802, possibly under another name. A Guernsey privateer captured her in 1805, but she first appeared as Venus in 1815. She traded generally until in 1830 she carried cargo to Port Jackson. Between 1831 and 1835, she made several voyages from Port Jackson as a whaler, sailing primarily to New Zealand waters. She returned to England and was last listed in 1838.

== Career ==
A source states that in 1805, a Guernsey privateer captured the vessel that would become Venus. It goes on to state that the vessel was condemned in prize and sold to Spurrier & Co., Poole. Venus did not appear under that name in Lloyd's Register (LR) until 1815.

Year	Master	Owner	Trade	Source
1815	T.Gadden	Spurrier	Poole–Newfoundland	LR
1816	T.Gadden	Spurrier	Poole–Newfoundland	LR
1821	T.Rowe; H.Bristow	Spurrier & Co.	Plymouth–London	LR; thorough repair 1819
1828	H.Bristow; Harden	Spurrier & Co.	London	LR; thorough repair 1819
1830	Harden; Harvey	Spurrier & Co.	Liverpool	LR; thorough repair 1819
1831	Harvey	Roy & Co.	Liverpool–Cape of Good Hope	LR; thorough repair 1819

Reportedly, Venus was sold to Roy & Co., in 1831, for the local Indian and Far East trade. Other information shows that she sailed for New South Wales with cargo and then made some voyages from Sydney as a whaler.

Venus, Harvey, master, sailed from Liverpool on 1 June 1830, bound for New South Wales. Venus, Harvey, master, arrived at Cape Town on 12 September, and left for Sydney on 1 October. She arrived at Hobart on 19 November, and sailed for Sydney two days later, arriving on the 29th. Venus, Harvey, master, left Sydney on 10 January 1831, bound for the "Sperm fishery". During this voyage Venus sailed below 72° South, becoming the first vessel to enter the Ross Sea and to return from there to Sydney on 31 December 1831. She arrived with 170 tons of "black oil". On 2 May 1832 Venus sailed for the sperm fishery again.

Venus, Samuel Harvey, master, Thomas Roy & Co., owners, was reported to be whaling off New Zealand in 1833.

Between 1833 and 1837 or 1838, LR frequently published only minimal information about the vessels listed. Fuller information was available in the Register of Shipping (RS), in 1833, the last year of publication for the RS. This information may have represented an intent, not a reality.

Year	Master	Owner	Trade	Source
1833	S.Harvey	Prowse	London–Swan River	RS; small repairs 1821 and damages repaired 1825

However, Venus had relocated to Sydney. Venus, of 288 tons (bm), appeared on a March 1833, list of whalers belonging to and sailing out of Sydney.

In August 1834, there was a report in Liverpool that Venus, Harvey. master "of this port", was at Bay of Islands on 7 March, with 900 barrels of oil.

On 6 January 1835, Venus, Harvey, master, arrived at Port Jackson with a full cargo of 1700 barrels of whale oil. The article reporting this stated that Venus was the first whaling vessel fitted out at Liverpool, that she had been out 16 months, and that she would return to her owners after having undergone some trifling repairs. It took some time for Venus to gather a cargo. She left Sydney on 17 May, bound for London with a cargo of colonial produce and a handful of passengers. She was at bay of Islands on 28 May, and left for London on 3 June. She was reported to have arrived safely at Deal on 20 September. In January 1837, a whaler from Scotland put into Bay of Islands; her master was Captain Harvey, late of Venus. (The whaler was later identified as Diana.)

Venus was last listed in LR, in 1838, with minimal data.
