= Mary Symonds =

Mary Ramsden
- Born: Mary Symonds; 1772; Herefordshire, England
- Died: 1854 (aged 81–82); Twickenham
- Resting place: St Mary's Church, Twickenham
- Years active: 1801–1808
- Known for: Correspondence and watercolours about Madras, India
- Spouse: John Ramsden (1768 – 6 April 1841)

Mary Ramsden (née Symonds; 1772–1854) was an English watercolour painter. In 1801, she travelled with her sister, Elizabeth Gwillim, and her sister's husband, Sir Henry Gwillim, to Madras, India (now Chennai), where Henry was appointed puisne judge to the newly created Supreme Court of Madras. She resided in Madras until 1808, and during this time she produced a series of watercolours of local landscapes as well as a series of watercolours of Indian fish. Her letters are noteworthy for the insight they offer about life in early nineteenth-century Madras.

== Biography ==
Mary Symonds was born in 1772, in Hereford (Herefordshire, England), to Esther and Thomas Symonds. She had four sisters, Frances, Ann (Nancy), Elizabeth (Betsy), and Hester (Hetty), and one brother, Thomas, who died in infancy prior to Mary's birth, in 1767. Frances also died in infancy.

Her father, Thomas Symonds, was a builder, an architect, and a surveyor in Hereford. In 1775, he was employed as clerk of works for Richard Payne Knight, proponent of theories of picturesque beauty, at Downton Castle. Upon Thomas Symonds's death on 12 March 1791, his wife Esther Symonds assumed operation of the family business. She died in 1806.

In 1801, Mary travelled with her sister, bird artist Elizabeth Gwillim, and her sister's husband, lawyer Henry Gwillim, to Madras, India (now Chennai). Henry Gwillim had been appointed a puisne judge of the Supreme Court at Madras. Mary resided in Madras until 1808, at which point she returned to England with Henry Gwillim, arriving on 13 May 1809. Elizabeth had died in Madras the year prior.

Mary Symonds married John Ramsden (1768 – 6 April 1841), a captain in the East India Company's mercantile fleet and the captain of the Phoenix, the ship on which she returned from India, on 30 November 1809, at St Helen's Bishopsgate (an Anglican church in London). The couple settled in Bishopsgate. In 1818, they moved to Ivy Lodge, London Road, Twickenham. John was the son of Jesse Ramsden (1735–1800), a celebrated mathematician and scientific instrument maker, and Sarah (1740–1796), daughter of the optical instrument maker John Dollond.

Mary and John had two sons. Their second, John George Ramsden, was born in 1815 (died 1862); the first was born in 1813 and died in infancy. Following her husband's death, she remained in Twickenham and resided with her son and his wife. Mary died in 1854 and was buried at St Mary the Virgin in Twickenham on 28 January 1854.

== Correspondence ==
Both Mary Symonds and her sister Elizabeth are significant historical figures due to the letters they sent from India to their mother and sister Hetty in England. The sisters' letters, of which there are 70 in total, are held at the British Library. They cover such topics as climate, cuisine, botany, daily life in India, the inhabitants of India, and the sisters' art practices. Mary wrote to a few other correspondents in addition to her mother and sister, including Reverend Thomas Clarke, Prebendary of Hereford, Herefordshire, and father of Richard Clarke (a friend of the Gwillims' in India and a clerk to Sir Henry in 1804), to whom she describes a visit to a "zenana", a Muslim women's residence. Mary also wrote a letter to Hetty recounting the cause and events of the Vellore mutiny, heavily criticizing "the ridiculous orders of government which principally occasioned the mutiny".

The full transcriptions of the letters as well as thematic excerpts can be accessed at the website of the research group The Gwillim Project.

== Paintings ==
Mary's sister Elizabeth may have been more preoccupied with, and is today better known for, her artistic and natural history pursuits, but Mary also painted and took great interest in her surroundings, exploring a variety of media and subject matters. Her letters and extant works attest to her engagement with multiple genres, including miniature portraits, landscapes, figure studies, and illustrations of fish.

=== The Madras and Environs Album ===
The Madras and Environs Album (The South Asia Collection, Norwich) is an album of 78 watercolours of India, including landscapes, urban scenes, and depictions of local individuals. The work of multiple artists is collected in the album, but many of the paintings are thought to be by Mary. Certain images are signed "MR" and dated to the early 1800s, while inscriptions on other images refer to "Lady G", "Sir Gwillim", and "Miss Symonds". Mary wrote in her letters home that her early artistic endeavours took the form of miniature portraits of other women, but Henry Gwillim advised that she should instead paint local scenes and persons so as to inform those in England of life in India; she thus turned to "making drawings of the country [and] colouring them on the spot". Likewise, in response to the wishes of her drawing instructor in England, the artist George Samuel, Mary painted local buildings; she wrote that she had illustrated "pagodas and choultries" and "mosques and mausoleums". Depictions of these structures can be found in the Madras and Environs Album.

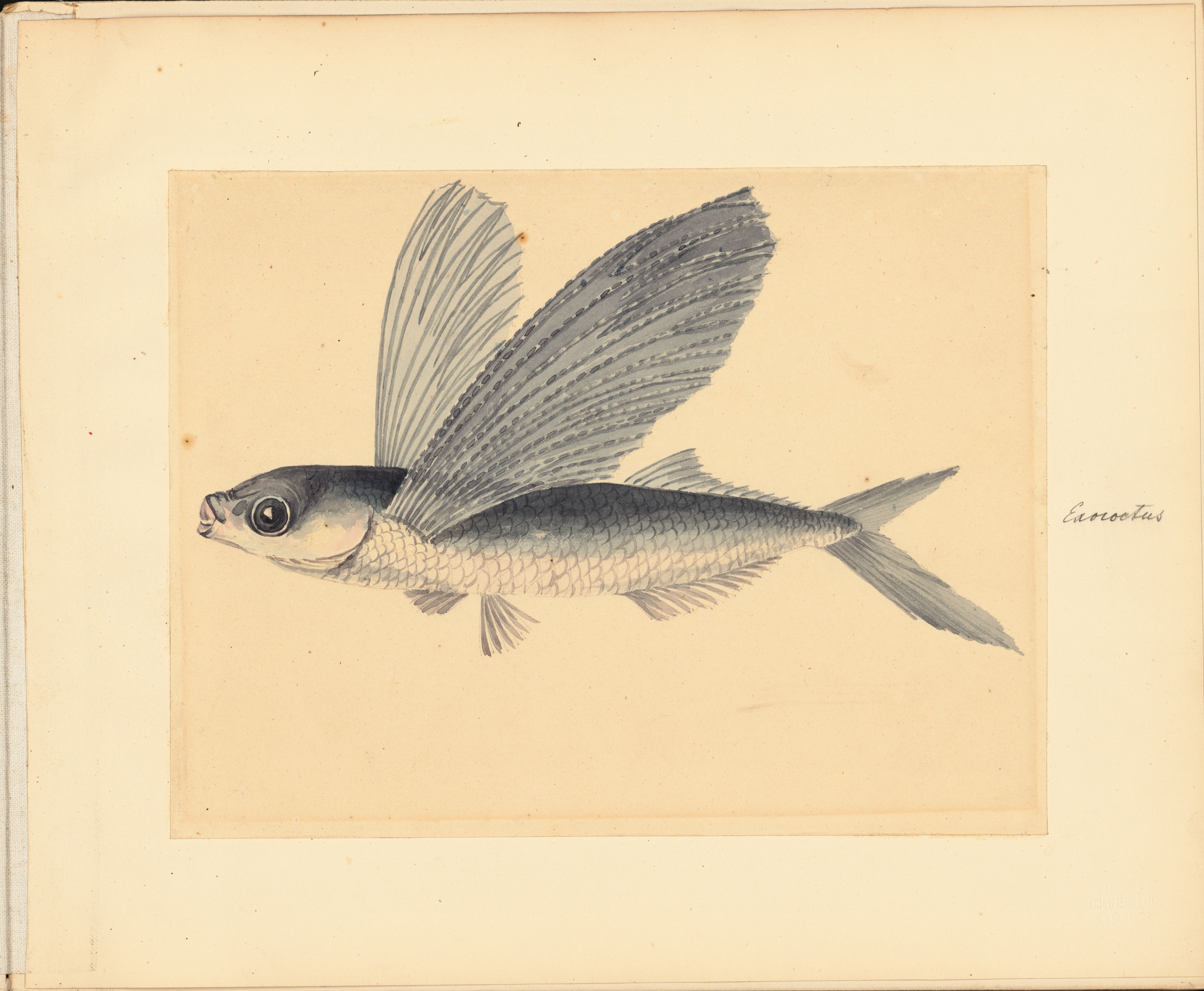
Painting showing a side view of flying fish in blue and grey; scales sketched individually. Pencilled inscription on mat reads "Exocoetus".

=== Fish ===
The Blacker-Wood Library at McGill University holds an album of 30 watercolours of fish, purchased by Casey A. Wood from the same dealer who sold him Elizabeth Gwillim's bird paintings. This set was, per Wood, "a parcel containing about thirty small (10 × 14 in.) mounted and coloured drawings of Indian Fishes". He described them: "Each mat bore an auctioneer's (or dealer's) printed number; a few were signed 'E. G.', and upon still more were written legends (that Sir Henry Drake-Brockman later translated for me as Urdu) of the native names of the subjects portrayed." Given the initials, Wood must have postulated that the fish, like the birds, were Elizabeth's work. Although these initials have yet to be found on the fish paintings, the paintings have since been tentatively re-attributed to Mary based on information from the letters: Elizabeth wrote that, during an 1806 trip to the fishing village of Kovalam/Covelong, "Mary drew above thirty sorts" of the myriad stunning fish they saw. Scholars have noted that the "written legends [...] of the native names", per Wood, are Tamil words in Urdu script and that the writer was likely a Hindustani, not Tamil, speaker.

== Selected works ==
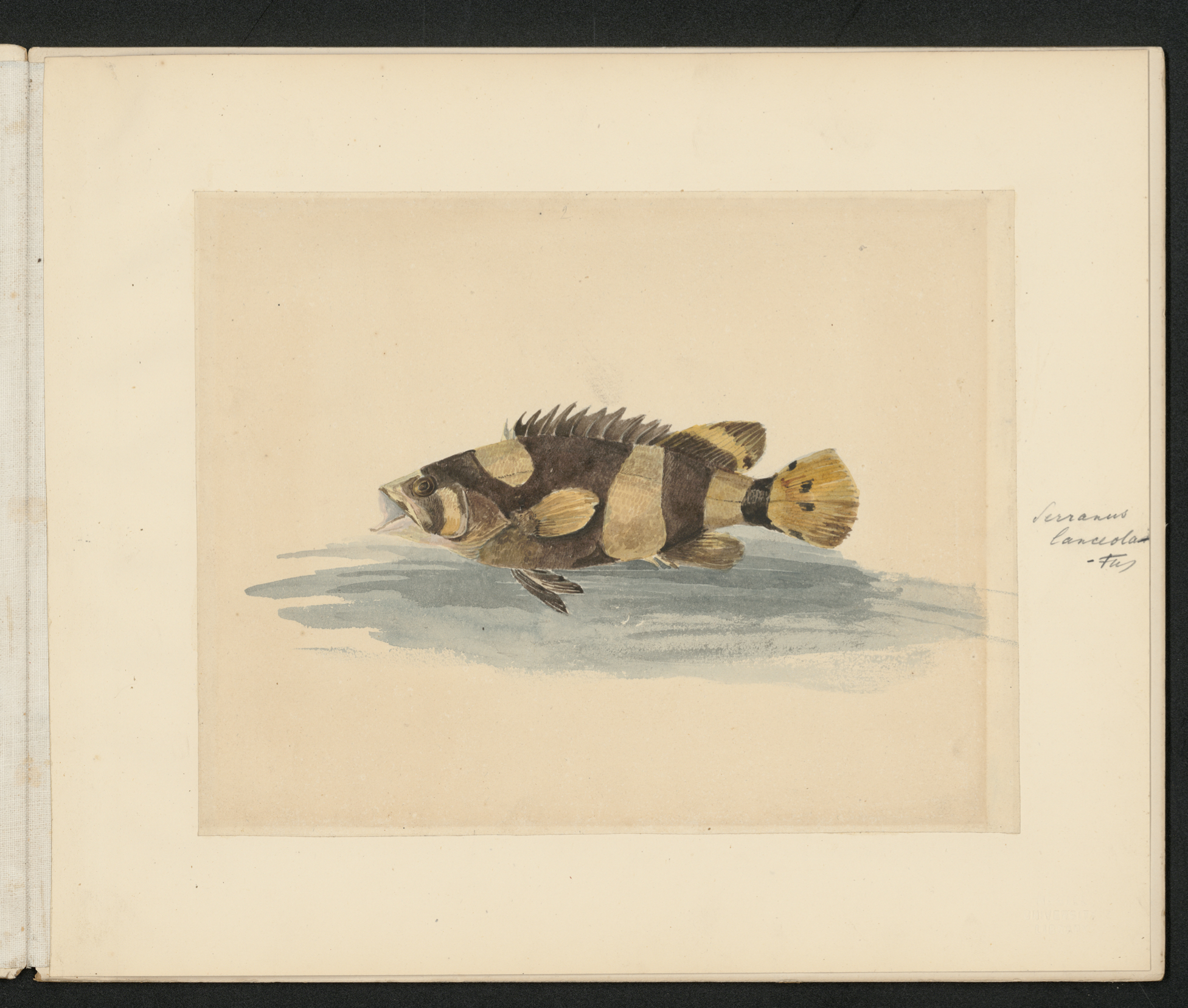
Serranus lanceolatus. Currently known as Epinephelus lanceolatus, the giant grouper.

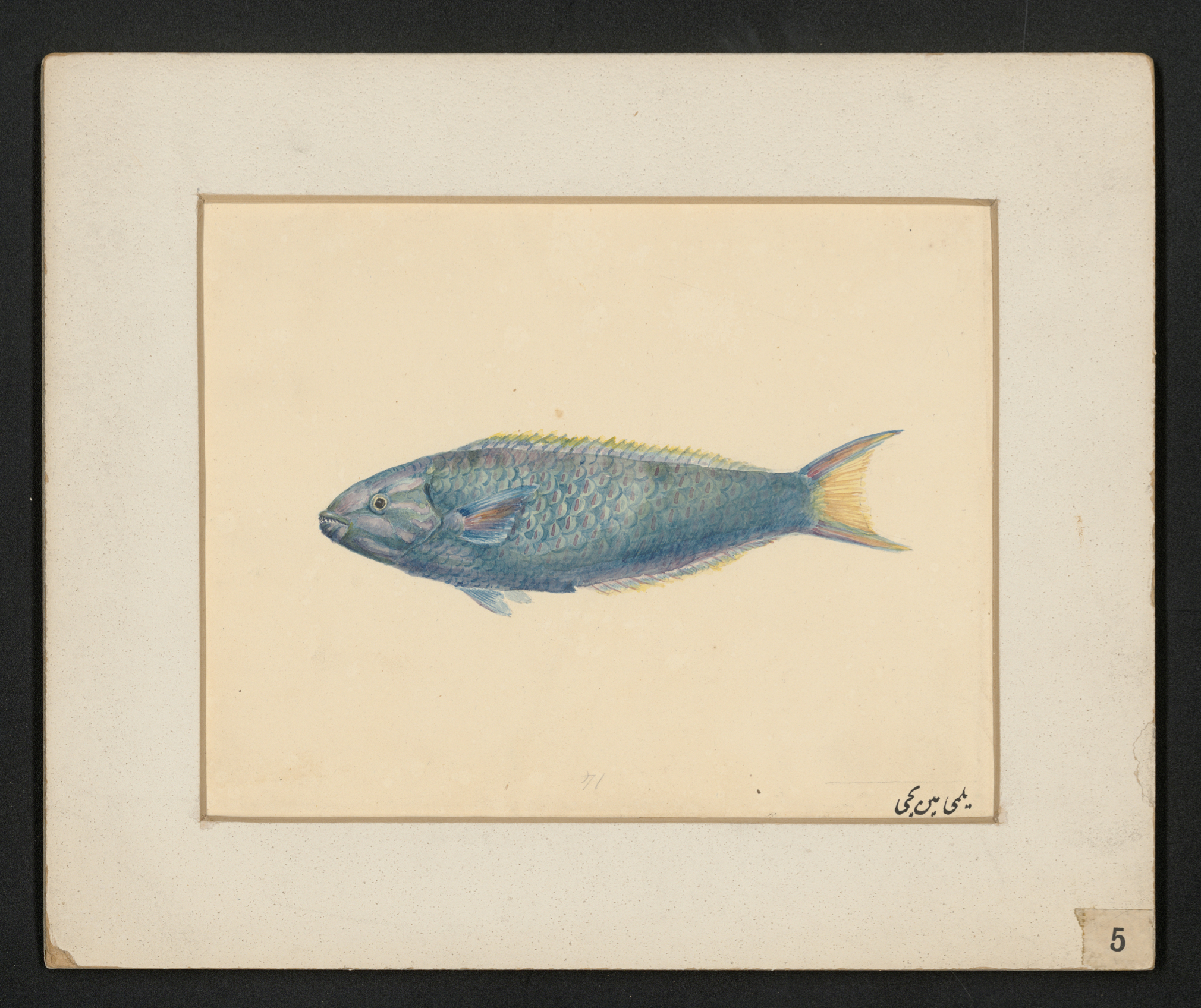
Julis lunaris. Currently known as Thalassoma lunare, the moon wrasse.

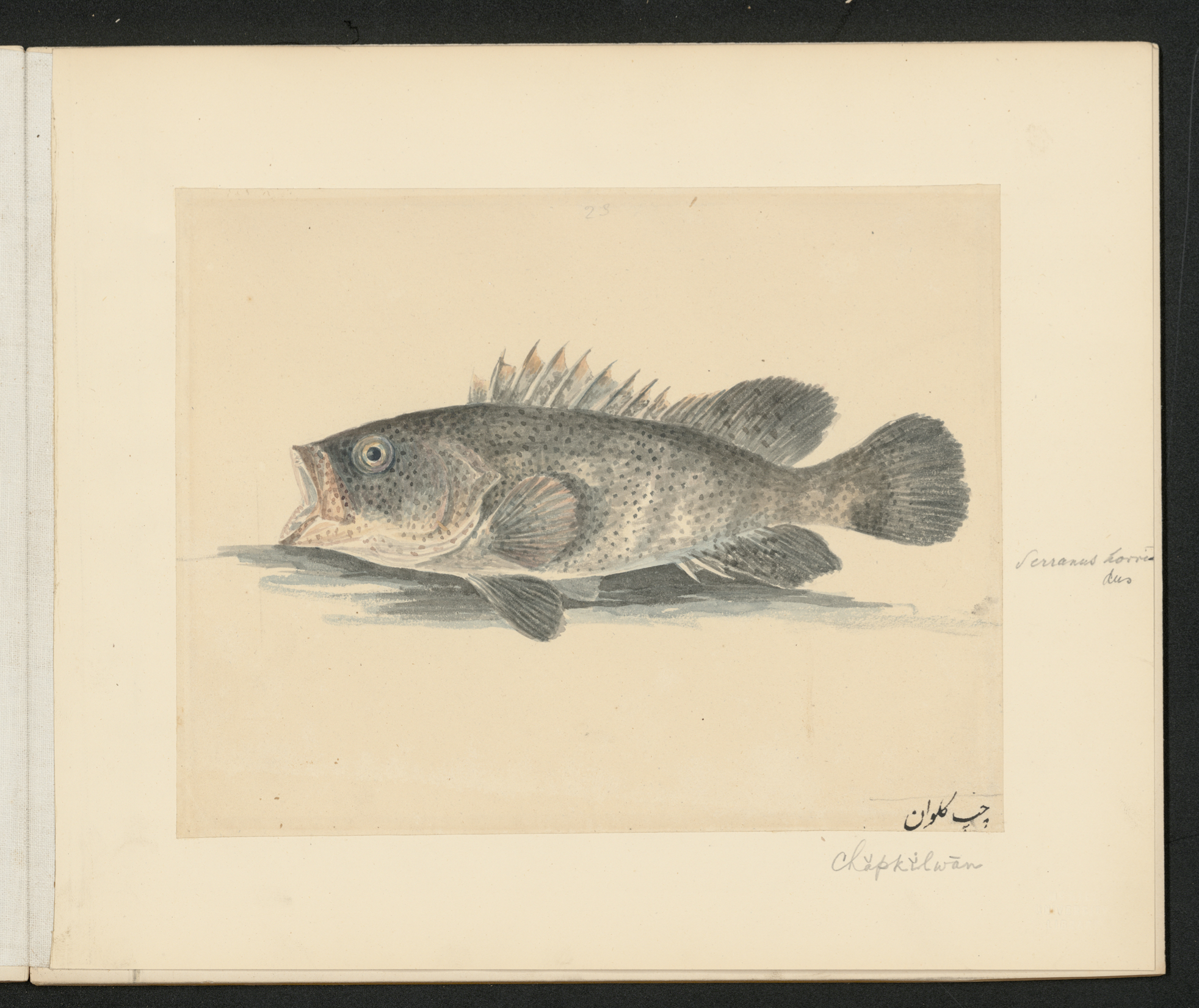
Serranus horridus. Currently known as Epinephelus fuscoguttatus, the Brown-marbled grouper.
