= Gwillim =

Gwillim is a surname. Notable people with the surname include:

- David Gwillim (born 1948), English actor
- Elizabeth Gwillim (bird artist) (1763–1807), English artist and naturalist
- Elizabeth Simcoe (1762–1850), née Elizabeth Posthuma Gwillim, English artist and diarist in colonial Canada
- Gareth Gwillim (born 1983), English professional footballer
- Henry Gwillim (c. 1760–1837), British judge
- Jack Gwillim (1909–2001), English character actor
- Moore Gwillim (died 1611), Welsh politician
- Sarah-Jane Gwillim, British television and stage actress

== See also ==
- Bradford West Gwillimbury, Ontario, Canada
- Castle Frank Brook, a buried creek in Toronto, Ontario, Canada named after Francis Gwillim
- East Gwillimbury, Ontario, Canada
- Gwillim Lake Provincial Park, British Columbia, Canada
