= Indian Trader (ship) =

A small number of vessels have borne the name Indian Trader:

- Indian Trader (1791 ship) made one voyage for the British East India Company (EIC). She was on her second voyage for the EIC when a French privateer captured her. The British recaptured her and she returned to merchant service, sailing to the Americas. She was lost c.1830.
- Indian Trader (1819 ship) was launched in 1819 at Howrah and wrecked in 1822 on the west coast of Sumatra.
