= List of shipwrecks in May 1822 =

The list of shipwrecks in May 1822 includes some ships sunk, foundered, grounded, or otherwise lost during May 1822.

== 1 May ==
List of shipwrecks: 1 May 1822
Ship	State	Description
Dorchester	(United Kingdom of Great Britain and Ireland) British North America	The schooner was wrecked on Grand Cayman Island.
Fairby	United Kingdom	The ship was destroyed by fire in the Demerara River with the loss of a crew member.

== 5 May ==
List of shipwrecks: 5 May 1822
Ship	State	Description
Columbine	United Kingdom	The ship was wrecked on Grenada. Her crew were rescued. She was on a voyage from Tobago to Grenada.

== 6 May ==
List of shipwrecks: 6 May 1822
Ship	State	Description
Halliday	United Kingdom	The ship was wrecked on the Alcoran Rock. She was on a voyage from Liverpool, Lancashire to Campeche, Mexico.
Sally Ann	Bremen	The ship sank near Bremen. She was on a voyage from Havana, Cuba to Bremen.

== 7 May ==
List of shipwrecks: 7 May 1822
Ship	State	Description
Favorite	United States	The ship was driven ashore and wrecked near Edgartown, Massachusetts. She was on a voyage from British Honduras to Boston, Massachusetts.
Nimble	United Kingdom	The ship was lost in the Gulf of St. Lawrence. She was on a voyage from Grenada to Quebec City, Lower Canada, British North America.

== 8 May ==
List of shipwrecks: 8 May 1822
Ship	State	Description
Charlotte	United Kingdom	The ship sprang a leak in the Dogger Bank and was abandoned. She was on a voyage from Newcastle upon Tyne, Northumberland to King's Lynn, Norfolk.

== 10 May ==
List of shipwrecks: 10 May 1822
Ship	State	Description
Isabella	United Kingdom	The ship sprang a leak and foundered in the Cairn Roads. Her crew were rescued. She was on a voyage from Glasgow, Renfrewshire to Drogheda, County Louth.
Jonge Heinrick	Prussia	The ship was driven ashore near Beaumaris, Anglesey, United Kingdom. She was on a voyage from Memel to Liverpool, Lancashire, United Kingdom.
Proxy	United Kingdom	The ship was driven ashore at Sunderland, County Durham. Her crew were rescued by the Sunderland Lifeboat. Proxy was refloated on 21 May. She was declared a total loss.
Speculation	Sweden	The ship struck a reef off Falsterbo and foundered. Her crew were rescued by a British ship. She was on a voyage from Stockholm to Viana do Castelo, Portugal.
Unity	United Kingdom	The ship foundered in the Irish Sea off the Tuskar Rock. Her crew survived. She was on a voyage from Swansea, Glamorgan to Dublin.
William	United Kingdom	The ship was wrecked near South Shields, County Durham with the loss of all hands.

== 11 May ==
List of shipwrecks: 11 May 1822
Ship	State	Description
Acorn	United Kingdom	The ship was driven ashore about 8 nautical miles (15 km) east of Calais, France. She was on a voyage from Memel, Prussia to Poole, Dorset. Acorn was later refloated and taken in to Calais.
Enterprize	United Kingdom	The ship was wrecked near Sunderland, County Durham with the loss of five of her crew.
Langley	United Kingdom	The ship was wrecked 4 nautical miles (7.4 km) north of Scarborough, Yorkshire with the loss of a crew member.
Mary	United Kingdom	The brig was driven ashore and wrecked at "Eden Dean".
Ocean	United Kingdom	The ship was driven ashore near Sunderland. Her crew were rescued by the Sunderland Lifeboat.
Ormus	United Kingdom	The ship was wrecked near Sunderland.
Ruby	United Kingdom	The brig was driven ashore and wrecked at Hartlepool, County Durham with the loss of three of her crew.
William	United Kingdom	The ship was driven ashore and wrecked 4 nautical miles (7.4 km) north of Hartlepool. Her crew were rescued.
William	United Kingdom	The ship was driven ashore and wrecked near North Shields, County Durham.

== 12 May ==
List of shipwrecks: 12 May 1822
Ship	State	Description
Haabet	Norway	The ship was wrecked on the Gunfleet Sand, in the North Sea off the coast of Essex, United Kingdom.
Hope	United Kingdom	The ship foundered in the Irish Sea between the Smalls and the Tuskar Rock.
Pallas	Norway	The ship ran aground and was damaged on the Gunfleet Sand. She was later refloated and taken in to the River Colne.
Vine	United Kingdom	The ship was wrecked on the Kentish Knock, in the North Sea off Margate, Kent, Her crew were rescued by Sir Godfrey Webster (United Kingdom). Vine was on a voyage from Newcastle upon Tyne, Northumberland to Caen, Calvados, France.

== 14 May ==
List of shipwrecks: 14 May 1822
Ship	State	Description
Indian Trader	United Kingdom	The East Indiaman capsized in a squall; the wreck was driven ashore at "Trumoon". Her crew were rescued.
Jane	United Kingdom	The ship foundered off The Cumbraes. Her crew were rescued. She was on a voyage from Saltcoats, Ayrshire to Rothesay, Bute.

== 17 May ==
List of shipwrecks: 17 May 1822
Ship	State	Description
Charles Fawcett	United Kingdom	The ship was driven ashore on the Cheshire bank of the River Mersey and hogged severely. She was on a voyage from Liverpool, Lancashire to New Orleans, Louisiana, United States. Charles Fawcett was later refloated and taken in to Liverpool.
Providence	United Kingdom	The ship was run down and sunk at Plymouth, Devon by Thalia (United Kingdom). Her crew were rescued. Providence was on a voyage from Limerick to London.
Union	United Kingdom	The ship was driven ashore and wrecked on Rathlin Island, County Antrim. She was n a voyage from Belfast, County Antrim to New Brunswick, British North America.

== 19 May ==
List of shipwrecks: 19 May 1822
Ship	State	Description
Brougham	United Kingdom	The brig was last sighted off the Cape of Good Hope on this date. She was on a voyage from Bengal, India to the Cape of Good Hope.

== 20 May ==
List of shipwrecks: 20 May 1822
Ship	State	Description
Africaine	French Navy	The 44-gun Pallas-class frigate was driven ashore and wrecked on the south coast of Cape Sable Island, Nova Scotia, British North America with the loss of six of her 250-plus crew. She was on a voyage from Martinique to Saint Pierre and Miquelon.
Charles Mills	United Kingdom	The ship foundered in the Bay of Bengal (15°00′N 85°30′E) with the loss of all but seven of the 73 people on board. The brig Scythe (France) rescued the survivors and took them to Kedgeree.
Robert Neilson	United Kingdom	The ship was wrecked at Maracaibo, Venezuela. She was on a voyage from Liverpool, Lancashire to Maracaibo.

== 21 May ==
List of shipwrecks: 21 May 1822
Ship	State	Description
St. Andrew	(United Kingdom of Great Britain and Ireland) British North America	The brig was driven ashore and wrecked near Nantucket, Massachusetts. She was on a voyage from Dominica to St. Andrews, New Brunswick.

== 22 May ==
List of shipwrecks: 22 May 1822
Ship	State	Description
Colibri	France	The ship was wrecked on Saint Pierre Island. Her crew were rescued.
Elizabeth	United States	The ship was wrecked on the south coast of Long Island, New York. She was on a voyage from Amsterdam, North Holland, Netherlands to new York City.
Thames	United States	The brig was driven ashore and wrecked on "Norman's Sand". She was on a voyage from Matanzas, Cubato Boston, Massachusetts.

== 23 May ==
List of shipwrecks: 23 May 1822
Ship	State	Description
Ardent	United Kingdom	The ship sprang a leak and foundered in the Atlantic Ocean 20 nautical miles (37 km) off Land's End, Cornwall. Her crew were rescued by Friends (United Kingdom). She was on a voyage from Bangor, Caernarfonshire to Exeter, Devon.
Earl Fitzwilliam	United Kingdom	The ship was wrecked on Anticosti Island, Lower Canada, British North America. All on board were rescued.
Little William	United States	The ship was abandoned in the Atlantic Ocean. Her crew were rescued by Tuscarora (United States). Little William was on a voyage from New York to St. Thomas, Virgin Islands. She was discovered at sea on 10 August by Mercator (United Kingdom); some of her cargo was salvaged.

== 25 May ==
List of shipwrecks: 25 May 1822
Ship	State	Description
Earl Fitzwilliam	United Kingdom	The ship was wrecked on Anticosti Island, Quebec City, Lower Canada, British North America. All on board were rescued.
Emma	United Kingdom	The ship fell off the blocks in drydock at North Shields, County Durham and was consequently condemned.
Recovery	United Kingdom	The ship was driven ashore 10 nautical miles (19 km) south west of Campbeltown, Argyllshire. She was on a voyage from New Orleans, Louisiana, United States to Greenock, Renfrewshire. Recovery was refloated on 30 May and towed in to Greenock.

== 27 May ==
List of shipwrecks: 27 May 1822
Ship	State	Description
Echo	United Kingdom	The ship was driven ashore near Gallipoli, Ottoman Empire. She was later refloated and resumed her voyage from Constantinople, Ottoman Empire to London.

== 28 May ==
List of shipwrecks: 28 May 1822
Ship	State	Description
Constantia	Russia	The ship ran aground on the Goodwin Sands, Kent, United Kingdom. She was on a voyage from Riga to L'Orient, Morbihan, France. Constantia was refloated on 1 June and taken in to Ramsgate, Kent in a waterlogged condition.
Hugh	United Kingdom	The ship was driven ashore in Portnessock Bay. She was on a voyage from Demerara to Belfast, County Antrim. Hugh was later refloated; she arrived at Belfast on 10 June.
Sostrene	Norway	The ship was driven ashore at Dungeness, Kent. She was on a voyage from St. Martin's to a Norwegian port.

== Unknown date ==
List of shipwrecks: Unknown date in May 1822
Ship	State	Description
Bella Antonio	Spain	The brig capsized 85 leagues (255 nautical miles (472 km)) off Cape Hatteras, North Carolina, United States with the loss of all but three of her crew. Survivors were rescued by Matilda (Spain). Bella Antonio was on a voyage from Havana, Cuba to Baltimore, Maryland, United States.
Criterion	United Kingdom	The ship was wrecked on Grand Manan Island, New Brunswick, British North America. She was on a voyage from Leith, Lothian to St. Andrews, New Brunswick.
Enterprize	United Kingdom	The ship was wrecked in Little Egg Harbor. Her crew were rescued. She was on a voyage from Bangor to Philadelphia, Pennsylvania, United States.
Espoir	France	The ship sprang a leak and was abandoned in the Atlantic Ocean. Her crew were rescued by Rotterdam (Netherlands). Espoir was on a voyage from Dunkirk, Nord to Newfoundland, British North America.
Favorite	United States	The ship was driven ashore and wrecked at Edgartown, Massachusetts in early May. She was on a voyage from British Honduras to Boston, Massachusetts.
Favorite	United Kingdom	The ship was driven ashore on Ragged Island, British North America before 7 May. She was on a voyage from Glasgow, Renfrewshire to Saint John, New Brunswick, British North America.
Margaret	United Kingdom	The ship was wrecked on Petit Manan Island, New Brunswick before 3 May. She was on a voyage from Liverpool, Lancashire to Campobello Island, New Brunswick.
Odin	Sweden	The ship was lost near "Lemwig", Jutland. She was on a voyage from Málaga, Spain to Stockholm.
Patriot	United States	The ship foundered in the Atlantic Ocean before 16 May. Her crew were rescued by Samuel Whitbread (United States).
Phœbe	(United Kingdom of Great Britain and Ireland) British North America	The ship foundered in the Atlantic Ocean with the loss of seven lives. Survivors were rescued by Martha (United Kingdom). Phœbe was on a voyage from Liverpool to St. Andrews, New Brunswick.
Union	United Kingdom	The ship was driven ashore near Domesnes, Norway in early May. She was on a voyage from London to Riga, Russia. Union was refloated on 17 May.
United Kingdom	United Kingdom	The ship was abandoned in the Atlantic Ocean.
