= Elizabeth Gwillim =

Elizabeth Gwillim may refer to:

- Elizabeth Simcoe née Elizabeth Posthuma Gwillim (1762–1850), artist and diarist in colonial Canada
- Lady Elizabeth Gwillim (bird artist) (1763–1807), bird artist in India
