= Benevenutus Grassus =

Benevenutus Grassus Hierosolimitanus (also called Benevenutus Grapheus/Crassus or Benvenuto Grassi of Jerusalem) (c. 1200-c. 1290) was a medieval eye doctor who lived in the second half of the thirteenth century and is known for his treatise on the treatment of eye disorders Ars Probatissima Oculorum or De probatissima arte oculorum, the only published record of his work. Based on his work, it is believed that he lived most of his life in Italy but had travelled to northern Africa. His work was translated and incorporated into many European language works and included instructions for cataract treatment. The earliest known English work that incorporates his teachings is Philip Barrough's The Method of Phisicke (1583). The oldest printed version of his book is edited by Severino of Ferrara from 1474. A copy of this was translated into English by Casey Albert Wood in 1929. The work of Benvenutus Grassus also made use of the works of Ali Ibn Isa's Tadhkirat al-Kahhalin (" The Oculists' Memorandum Book ") which was probably published in the 11th century.

A study of a German translation has suggested that Grassus studied at the Salernitan school of medicine which had connections to Arab medicine. The text claims that Grassus learnt from a variety of sources and practiced by travelling to various places both in the temperate and tropic areas. He quotes Hippocrates, Galen, Johannicius and Hunayn bin Ishaq of Baghdad.
