= Elizabeth Gwillim (bird artist) =

English artist and naturalist

Lady Elizabeth Gwillim
- Born: Elizabeth Symonds; 21 April 1763; Hereford, England
- Died: 21 December 1807 (aged 44); Chennai, India
- Resting place: St. Mary's Church, Madras, India; 13.0788798°N 80.2865716°E
- Years active: 1801–1807
- Known for: Watercolours of Indian birds
- Spouse: Sir Henry Gwillim

Elizabeth, Lady Gwillim (née Symonds; 21 April 1763 – 21 December 1807) was an English artist and naturalist. While living in Madras (now Chennai), India, from 1801 to 1807, Lady Gwillim painted a series of about 200 watercolours of Indian birds. Produced about 20 years before John James Audubon published his famous The Birds of America (1827–1839), Gwillim's work has been acclaimed for its accuracy and natural postures––she made her watercolours by observing living birds, sometimes in their natural environments.

== Early life in England ==
Elizabeth was born in the valley of Wye, Hereford, daughter of Esther and Thomas Symonds. She had four sisters: Frances, Ann (called Nancy), Mary Symonds (called Polly), and Hester (called Hetty), as well as a younger brother, Thomas, who died in infancy. Frances also died in infancy. Her father Thomas Symonds was a stonemason and was sworn a Freeman of the City of Hereford on 10 December 1753. He was also a draughtsman, architect, and monumental mason whose work in Hereford and Somerset was very well-regarded. In 1775 he was acting as clerk of works for Richard Payne Knight at Downton Castle. He was appointed surveyor of the Hereford Cathedral in 1777; following the collapse of the tower (a disaster which he had warned of) in 1786 he retired. Upon his death in March of 1791, his wife Esther continued his business until 1803. Esther Symonds died in 1806.

Elizabeth married Henry Gwillim (1759 – 22 September 1837) on 27 May 1784, in London at St. Bride’s Church on Fleet Street. Henry was a lawyer and judge whose family was also from Hereford. Information on their children is inconclusive: London archives document the burial of an infant on 13 January 1786, also named Elizabeth, who was born 31 March 1785 and baptized 20 June 1785 at St. Bride's. Other sources familiar with Gwillim’s life note another daughter named Ann, baptized 10 June 1787, and a son Henry, baptized 11 October 1789. These two children were born in Sarnesfield in Hereford and Henry's burial is recorded in nearby Kinnersley on 28 February 1790. Elizabeth describes herself as childless in a letter to her sister Hetty written in 1806 from Madras, and none of her preceding letters mention children.

In 1797, Henry became the Chief Justice of the Isle of Ely and then by 1801, he was appointed as one of the judges of the newly created Supreme Court of Madras, for which he was knighted. Elizabeth was escorted to court before their departure by the Bishop of Ely and Agneta Johnson Yorke, the widow of Charles Yorke, the former Chancellor, but Sir Henry did not receive his knighthood until after they had left England via Portsmouth, due to the illness of the king.

== Time in India ==
Elizabeth Gwillim, her husband, her unmarried sister Mary Symonds, Sir Henry’s assistant Richard Clarke, another clerk, and two Indian servants embarked at Plymouth on the Hindostan in 31 March 1801, arriving in Madras (now called Chennai) almost five months later, on 26 July. Their life there is thoroughly detailed in letters, now held in the British Library, from the sisters to their mother, sister Hester, and friends back in England. The letters cover a wide variety of topics such as the climate, the landscape, the food, local social and religious customs, and much more. Scholars from many fields have read the Gwillim-Symonds letters for information on diverse subjects, such as their visits to women in the zenanas and the role of devadasi women in society. Most famously, however, Gwillim detailed the natural world around her in her letters and in the many bird paintings she created in her seven years in Madras.

== Bird paintings ==
=== Influence ===
It is unclear where Gwillim’s inspiration to start painting the birds of Madras began, other than a clear and focused interest within herself. She and her sister Mary very likely received basic drawing instructions from their artistic father, and from their letters we know that they later trained under George Samuel, whom they often mention. Samuel painted primarily landscapes in both watercolours and oils, and his influence may be visible in Gwillim’s work.

The boom in illustrated natural history books in the mid-18th century surely made an impression. Gwillim names naturalist and author Thomas Bewick in a letter, telling her sister Hetty that she had seen an owl from Bewick’s A History of British Birds (volume one, Land Birds, 1797). She also requests that Hetty send her Bewick’s second volume on water birds, published in 1804. Other naturalists publishing on the native birds of England at this time include William Lewin (The Birds of Great Britain, with Their Eggs, Accurately Figured, 1789–1794), John Latham (ornithologist) (A general synopsis of birds 1781–1785), and Edward Donovan (The Natural History of British Birds, 1792–97). However, during this time of global exploration, Gwillim may also have seen birds from around the world before she herself departed England. Authors such as George Edwards (A Natural History of Uncommon Birds, 1743–51), Mark Catesby (Natural History of Caroline, Florida and the Bahama Islands, 1729–47), and Thomas Pennant (Indian Zoology, 1790) all contributed to the growing field of ornithological illustrations, and in her own series Gwillim painted birds that were also featured in each of these aforementioned earlier volumes.

Gwillim refers in one of her letters to the Leverian collection (referred to by her as Parkinson's [museum], then at the Blackfriars Rotunda), which displayed both stuffed birds, including a species of pheasant sent from India by Mary Impey, and paintings of birds. George Shaw's catalogue of the Leverian collection, featuring bird paintings by Sarah Stone, is another possible source of inspiration.

=== Artistic process ===
Knowledge of Gwillim’s artistic process comes from letters, primarily a description from Mary: "Poor Betsy is never out of trouble for if you gets [sic] dead subjects to draw from they become offensive before she can finish the work to her mind, & when the birds are brought in alive they stare, or kick, or peck, or do some vile trick or other that frightens her out of her wits, sometimes she thinks the birds look sick, that is whenever they stand quiet & then in a great fit of tenderness she lets them fly before they are finished, least thier [sic] sufferings should be revenged upon her or their ghosts should come flying round her & flapping thier [sic] great wings, scare her to death. These are serious troubles I assure you. But we do all we can to remedy such evils & have now got a venerable looking old Moor man who catches a bird at a time he holds them in proper attitudes or feeds these miserable captives in a proper manner, for her poor concience [sic] sake."

Mary further details that in addition to the live birds which cause trouble as subjects, there are also dried skins of birds all around their house. Mary notes in a different letter that "her present employments keep her quite happy I almost wish you could see her in her glory; that is, with about twenty black men round her, a table full of books, the floor strewed with baskets of seeded branches of trees, and she herself standing in the midst with her cap snatched [?] to one side and talking away till she is quite fatigued."

Gwillim herself writes to her sister and mother that she is very much involved and absorbed in her work, often apologizing for writing so little as she is otherwise painting. She estimates having drawn about one hundred by 1805 and in the next two years "a great great great many birds" more. Gwillim’s health was never robust, but it seems only illnesses, such as heat exhaustion and later shingles, slowed her ambition.

=== Style ===
There exists a great deal of variation within Gwillim’s paintings of birds, and thus a singular "style" is difficult to characterize. However there are different categories into which her paintings can be sorted and a few consistent traits visible in all. Of the 121 known paintings, held in the Blacker Wood Natural History collection at the McGill University Library, 56 have full backgrounds, 26 of the paintings have limited backgrounds, and 39 of the paintings have no background at all. The fully realized backgrounds contain features such as palm trees, distant mountains, and occasionally buildings such as temples. The limited backgrounds contain rocks or branches with some foliage contoured closely to the body of the bird. The paintings that have no backgrounds are perhaps unfinished, or may be the victims of Gwillim’s constant shortage of art supplies. The availability of paper, paints, and brushes was subject to the inconsistencies of ocean travel from England to Madras, and Gwillim herself notes that if she were to paint all her backgrounds in the style of her teacher George Samuel, she would run out of colours to do so even faster. Gwillim painted the birds themselves first, and the backgrounds second.

The most consistent trait in Gwillim's birds is her depiction and placement of feathers in such a way that shows an unprecedented understanding of avian anatomy. An aspect of ornithology was pterylography, the study of the patterns of distribution of the pterylae and apterylae particularly in young birds as these were morphological indicators of evolutionary relatedness. Gwillim accurately depicted the patterning and layering of wing and tail feathers in a seated bird, paying attention to multiple different types of feathers in specific locations and relations to their functions and to one another in the anatomy of the bird. Her colouring of the feathers is also very delicately and accurately rendered.

== Botany ==
Gwillim also took a keen interest in botany, detailed often in her letters, and was an active member of the global network of naturalists who sent seeds, plants, and illustrations to their friends and peers. Gwillim sent seeds to Lizzie Thoburn, daughter of Frank Thoburn, who ran a nursery of exotic plants in Brompton. Gwillim was also a serious collector for Reginald Whitely, who continued the nursery after Thoburn's death. She was cited in Curtis's Botanical Magazine, the preeminent publication on the topic at the time and praised by the editor John Sims (taxonomist) for her "accurate and graceful drawings." Both James Anderson (botanist), Physician General of the East India Company, and Johan Peter Rottler, a French Alsatian missionary and botanist living in Madras, became friends of hers. Rottler named a plant after her: Gwillimia indica, later found to be an already described species of Magnolia, Magnolia coco. Gwillim painted the plant at Dr. Rottler’s request, and the drawing was sent to Dr. Smith. The drawing is now in the collection of the Linnean Society of London. In addition there are ten watercolour sketches of plants in the Blacker Wood collection but one can imagine that many more were once extant.

Gwillim also consulted with local doctors for the common names of the plants, Brahmins for the Sanskrit name, and then her own books for the Linnaean classification before she drew them. Gwillim was learning Telugu, an important language in Madras at the time, and notes that "without some little knowledge of Botany it is impossible to read the Hindoo languages - Their allusions to particular plants which are essential to their different ceremonies are so pointed that unless you know the plants which Botany alone can teach you, the merit of the whole passage is lost; and after learning a little Botany it seems almost impossible to stop." Thus, hers was not just a flower still-life practice, but a culturally aware, scientific approach to illustrating the natural world.

Elizabeth and Mary’s letters also reveal the often uncredited role of local experts and collectors. The letters record that Indians brought Gwillim birds and other natural objects that would interest her and that she might draw. She relied on their expertise for sourcing her subjects, for managing their care (see the "venerable old Moor man" mentioned above), and for information on their habitats and behaviour, as her own ability to observe them in the wild would have been limited.

== Death and legacy ==
Gwillim died of unknown causes in December 1807 and was buried on 21 December 1807 at St. Mary’s Church in Madras, which houses her grave marker. Her husband was recalled from the Court the following year under contentious circumstances and returned with Mary to England via the Cape of Good Hope. From that point the life of the paintings is unknown until they were obtained by the founder of the Blacker Wood Library at McGill University, Casey Albert Wood, in the early 1920s from a private bookdealer in London, where they had been forgotten in the basement. Wood bought the large, dust-covered portfolio of Gwillim’s birds, as well as a series of fish and flowers. The only further provenance information is that the London dealer has acquired them "at a sale in the country" many years earlier.

On Gwillim’s place in the history of bird illustrations, Wood wrote: "It has been the proud belief of Americans, myself included, that it was our Audubon who first produced full length portraits of the largest birds, and certainly the pictures of the male and female Wild Turkey, of Washington's Eagle etc., and their exact reproduction in the elephant folio bear out that claim. However, so far as originals are concerned, we must now concede the palm to Lady Gwillim, who so far as I know, is the first artist-ornithologist to paint full-sized and exact pictures of any considerable number of birds whose length exceeds, say, 35 inches." Terence Michael Shortt called her art works "the finest ever done of Asian birds".

=== Exhibition history ===
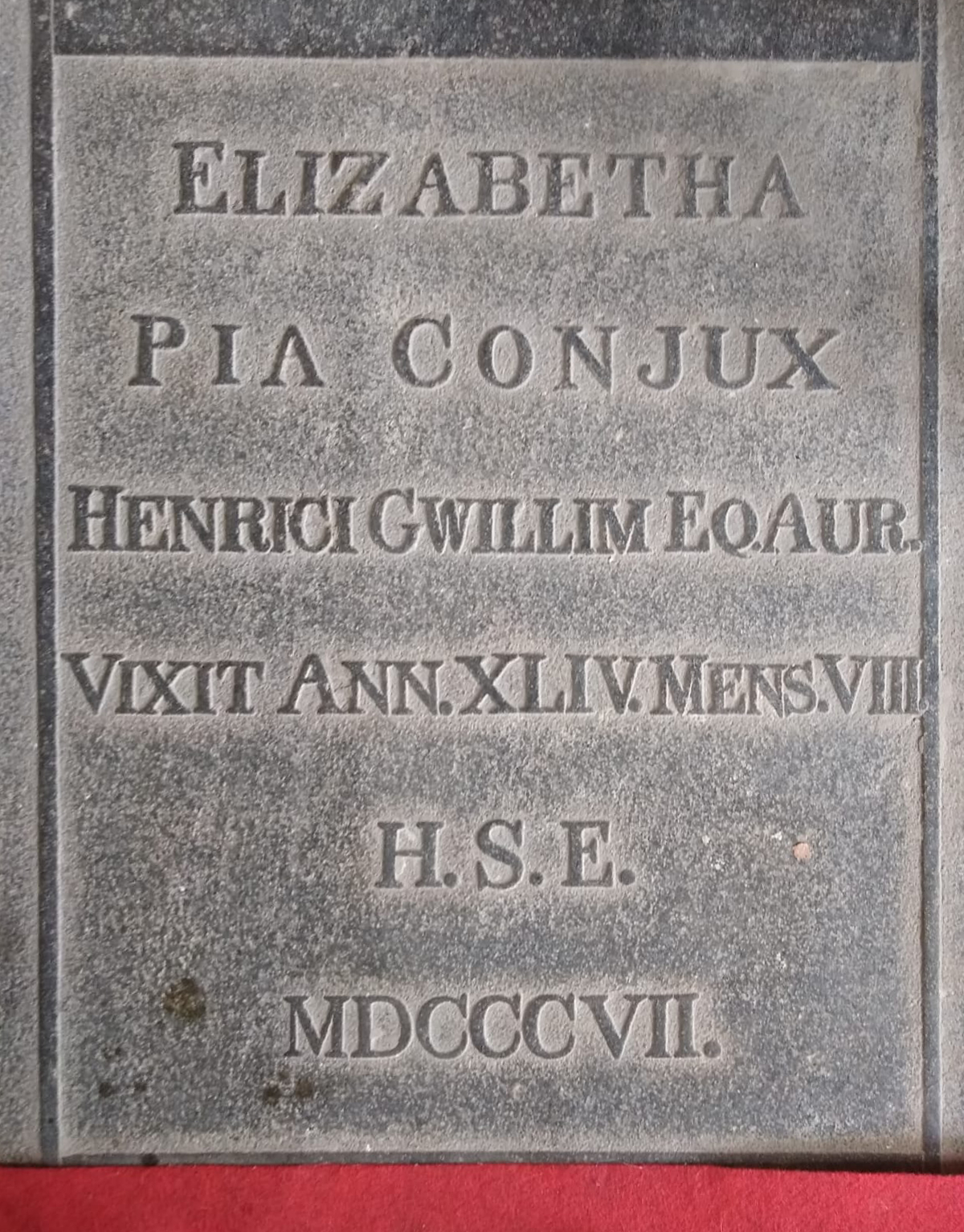
Grave inscription at St. Mary's Church, Fort St. George, Chennai

The earliest exhibition of Gwillim’s work was in a group show at the Victoria Memorial Museum (now the Canadian Museum of Nature) for the Forty-fourth Meeting of the American Ornithologists’ Union in Ottawa, Ontario, October 1927. Other group exhibits featuring Gwillim’s work include the Royal Ontario Museum’s Animals in Art in 1975 and the Glenbow-Alberta Institute’s Birds of Prey in 1977.

The Robert McLaughlin Gallery in Oshawa, Ontario, exhibited the first and only solo show of 60 of Gwillim's paintings from 27 May – 22 June 1980. Curated by Allan Walkinshaw with contributions from Canadian ornithologist and artist Terence Michael Shortt, this exhibition and its catalogue situated Gwillim among other early British naturalists as well as within the popularity of watercolors as a serious medium. In his chapter, Shortt noted Gwillim’s scientific attention to the details of her birds, especially their feathers, and claimed that "no artist before 1800 had demonstrated the kind of intimate understanding of pterylography that is revealed in the Gwillim birds."

=== The Gwillim Project ===
Elizabeth Gwillim saw renewed scholarly attention in 2019-2020 due to the Gwillim Project. This international project was a partnership between McGill University Library’s Rare Books and Collections department (the Gwillim Collection is part of the Blacker Wood collection), the South Asia Collection in Norwich, UK (which holds the Madras Album, primarily attributed to Mary Symonds), the Aga Khan Museum in Toronto, and the DakshinaChitra Museum in Chennai, with the collaboration of a network of scholars in Canada, the US, the UK, and India. The Gwillim project was funded by the Social Sciences and Humanities Research Council of Canada.

== Selected works ==
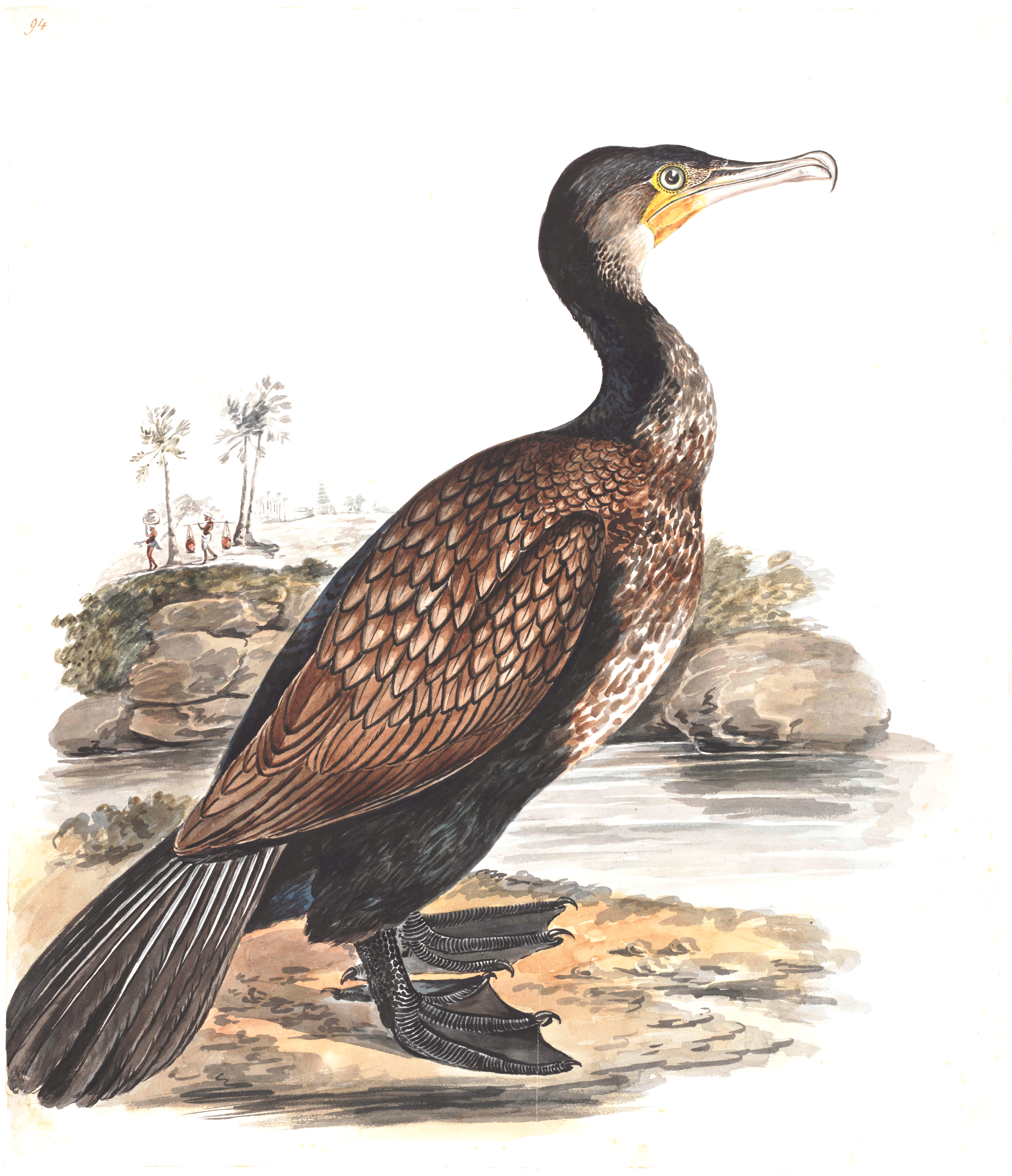
Great cormorant

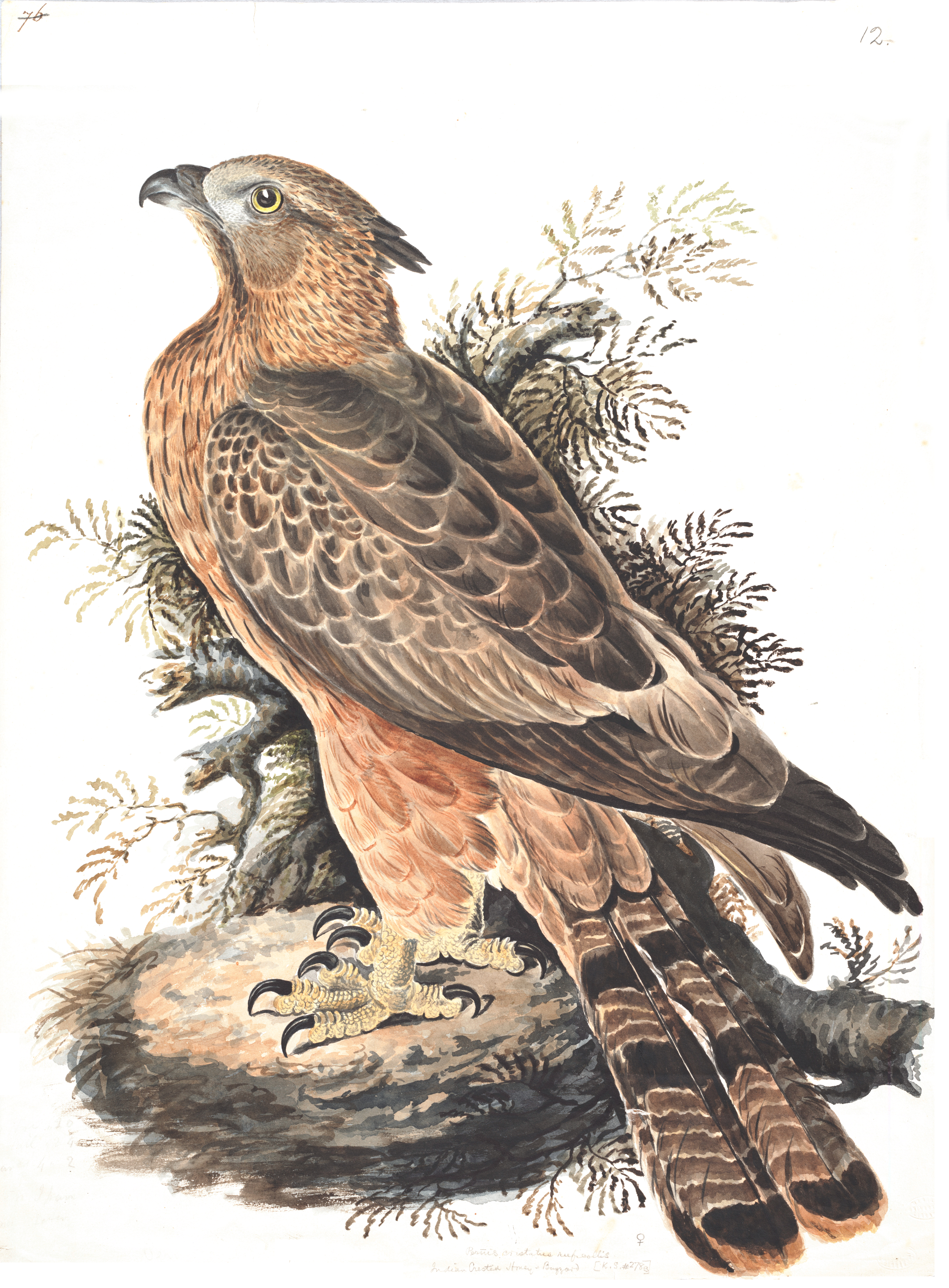
Crested honey buzzard

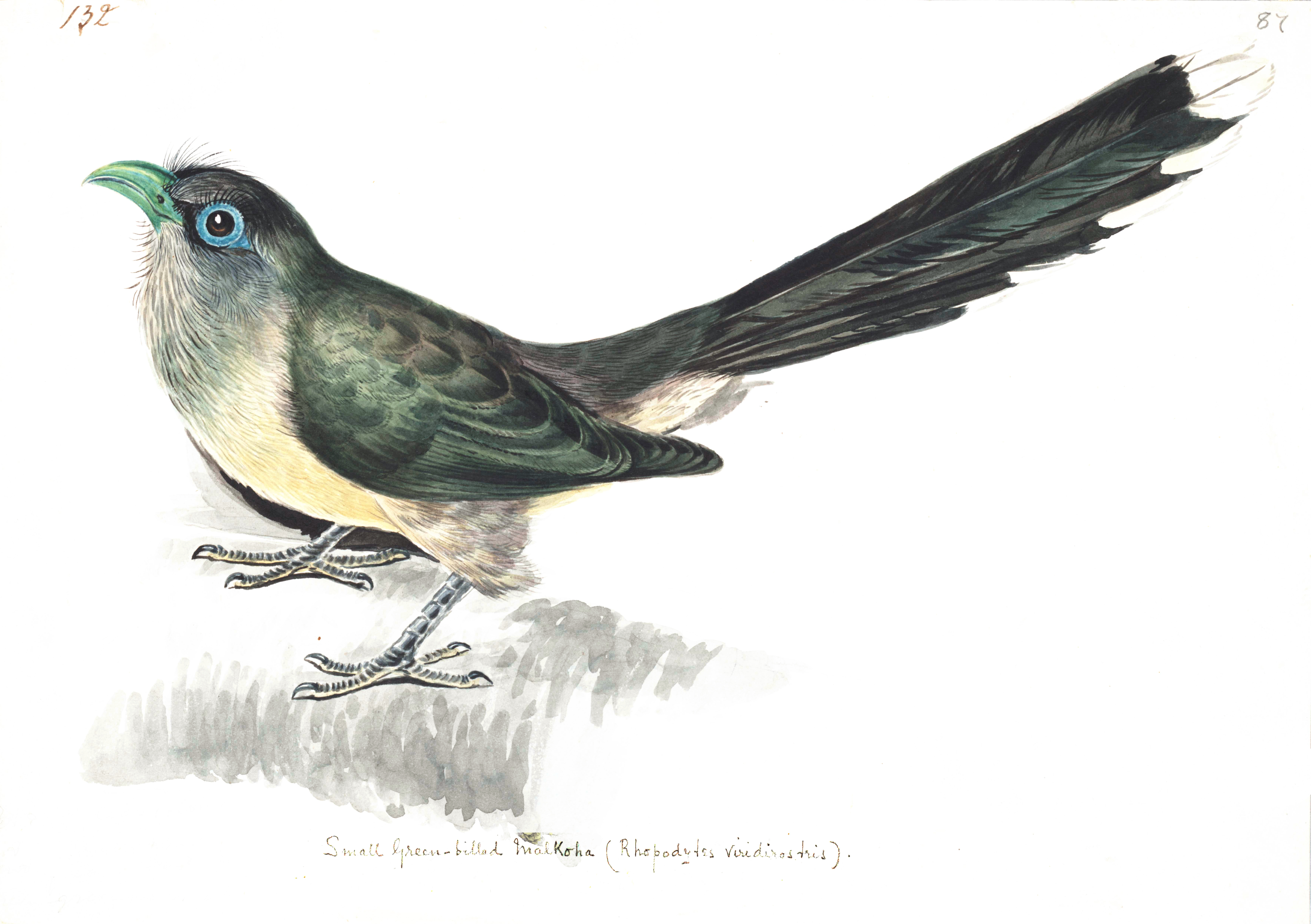
Blue-faced malkoha

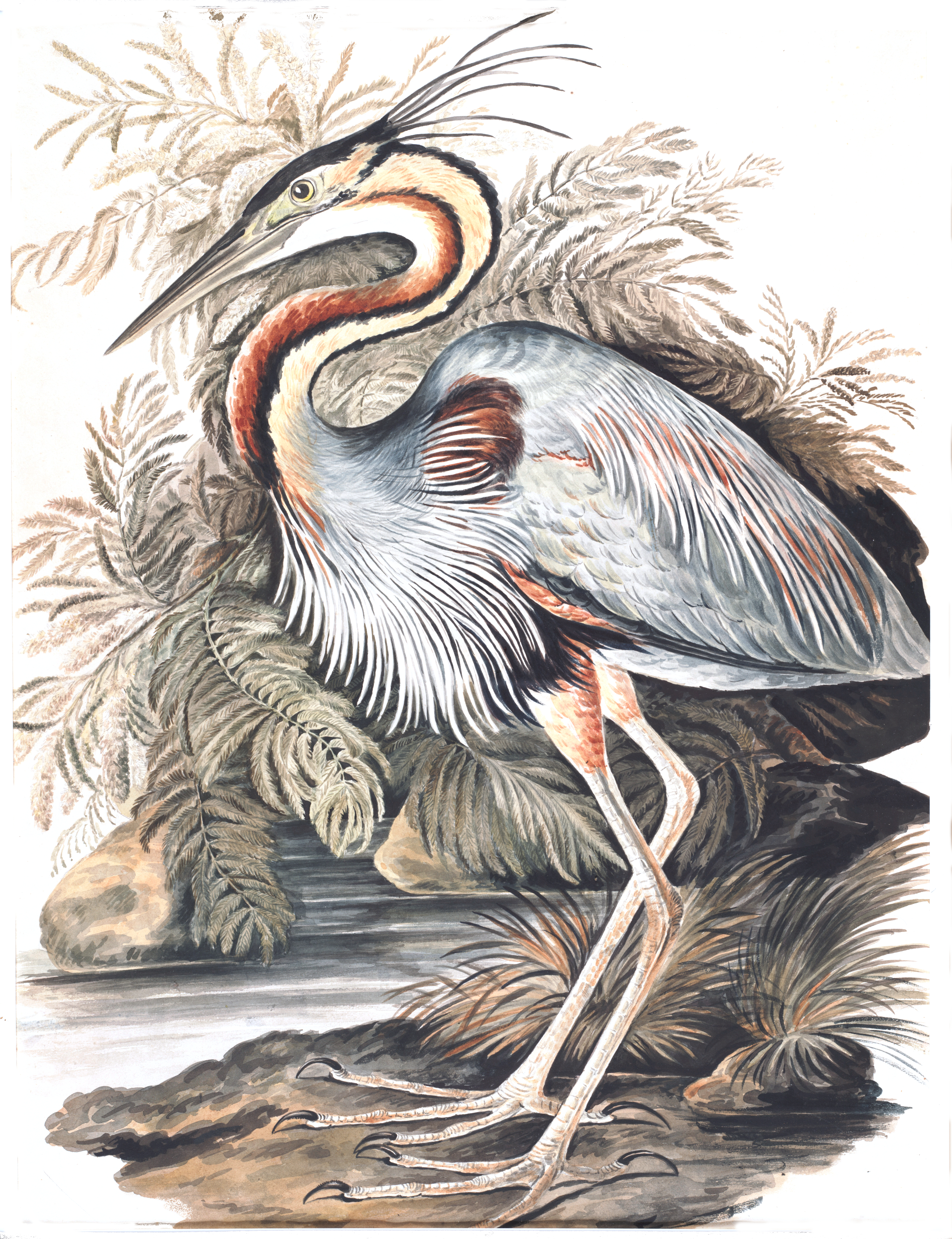
Purple heron

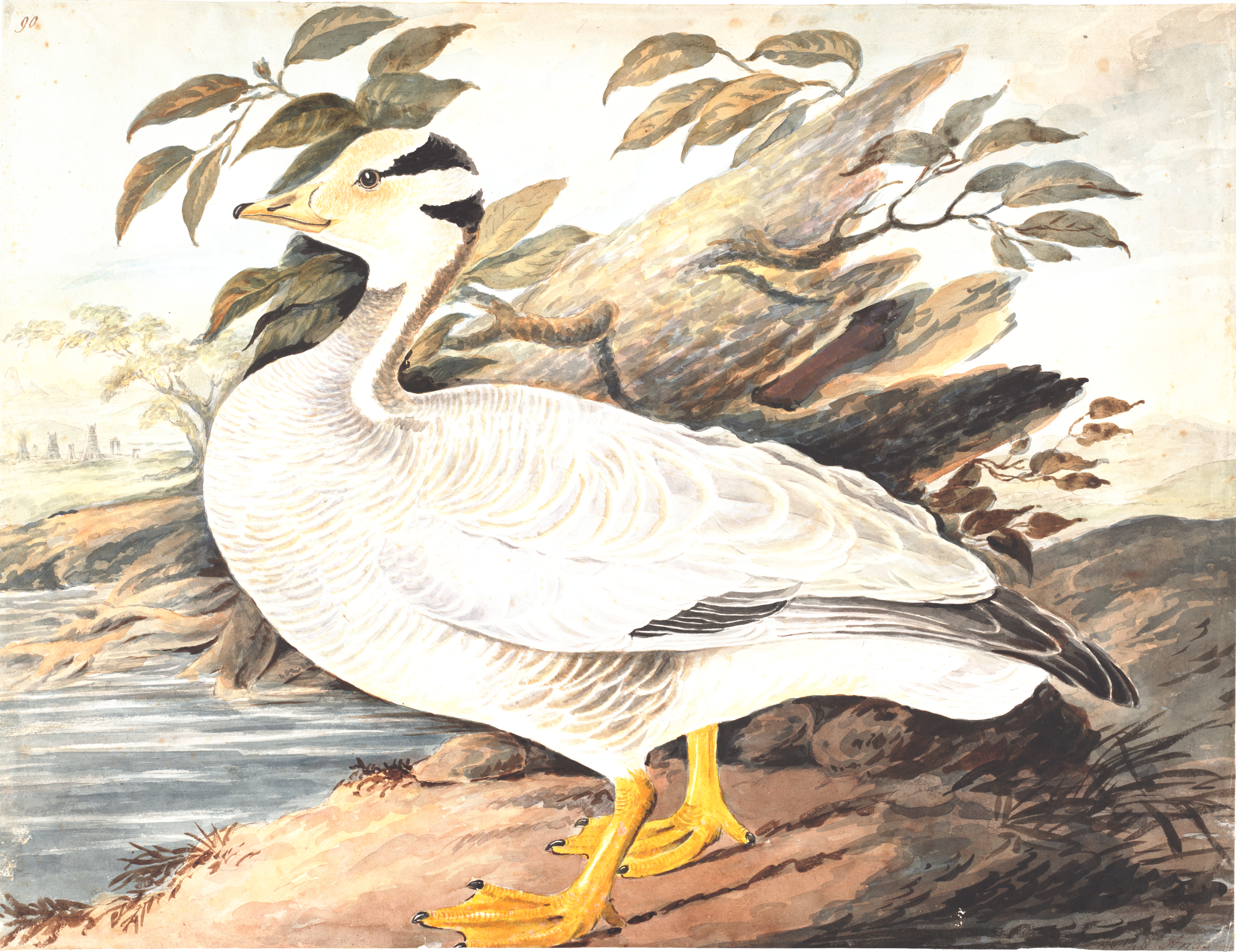
Bar-headed goose

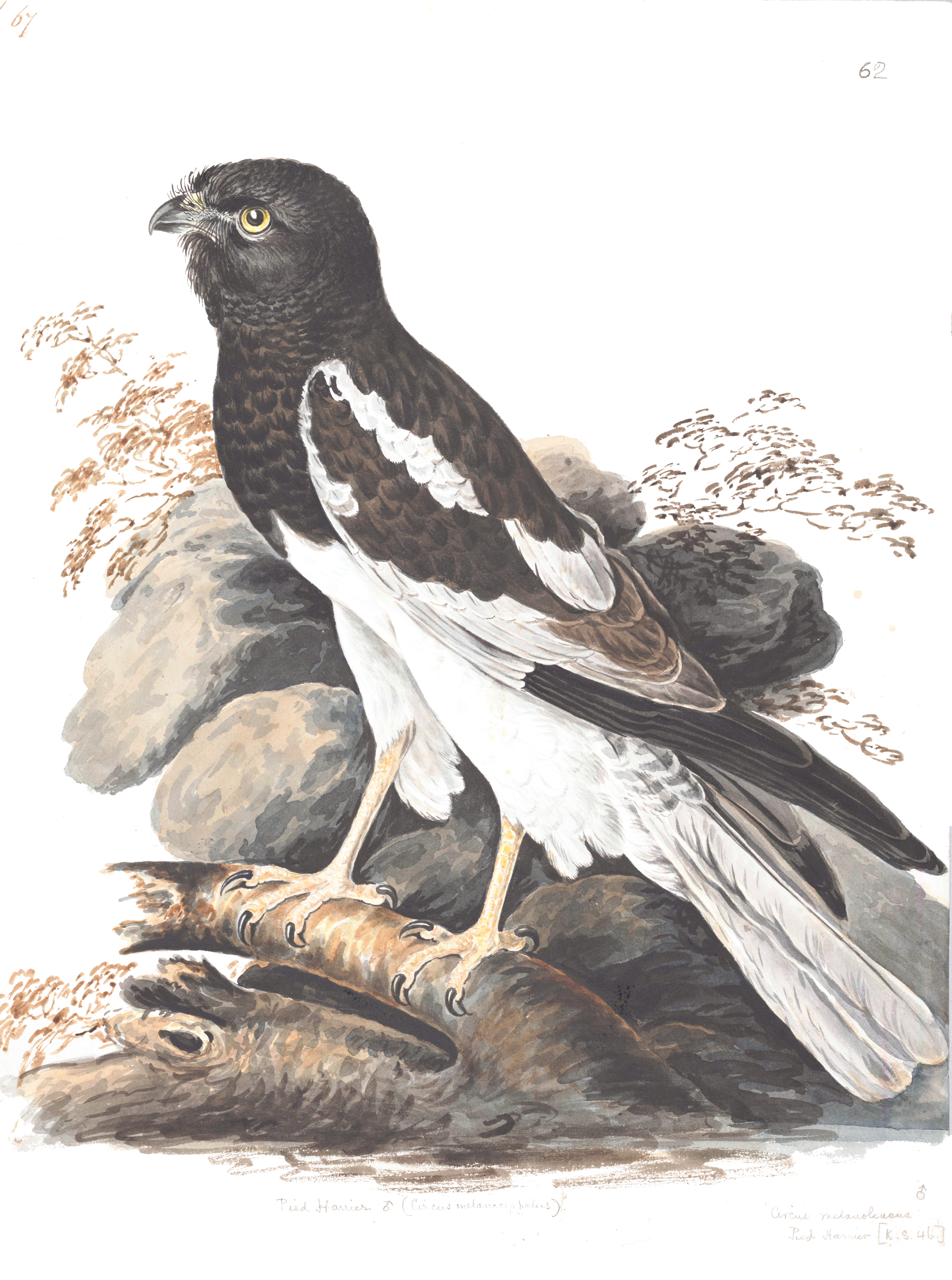
Pied harrier
