= Earl Spencer =

Earl Spencer may refer to:

== People, non-peerage ==
- Earl Winfield Spencer Jr. (1888–1950), United States Navy pilot; first husband of Wallis, Duchess of Windsor
- Earle Spencer (1925–1973), American big band leader from the late 1940s

== Peerage ==
- Earl Spencer (title), title in the peerage of Great Britain

- John Spencer, 1st Earl Spencer (1734–1783), a grandson of the 3rd Earl of Sunderland through his third and youngest son
- George Spencer, 2nd Earl Spencer (1758–1834), politician
- John Spencer, 3rd Earl Spencer (1782–1845), politician, better known as Lord Althorp
- Frederick Spencer, 4th Earl Spencer (1798–1857), naval commander
- John Spencer, 5th Earl Spencer (1835–1910), politician
- Charles Spencer, 6th Earl Spencer (1857–1922), courtier and politician
- Albert Spencer, 7th Earl Spencer (1892–1975), army officer and politician
- John Spencer, 8th Earl Spencer (1924–1992), father of Diana, Princess of Wales
- Charles Spencer, 9th Earl Spencer (born 1964), younger brother of Diana, Princess of Wales

== Vessels ==
- Earl Spencer (ship)
