= Earl Spencer (ship) =

Several British vessels were named Earl Spencer for one or another of the members of the Spencer family:

- Merchant vessels
  - Earl Spencer (1795 EIC ship) was an East Indiaman, launched in 1795 for the British East India Company (EIC). She made seven voyages for the EIC until in 1811-12 the government took her up to transport convicts to Australia in 1813. On her return voyage from Australia she sailed via China, where she carried a cargo back to England for the EIC. She was last listed in 1820.
  - Earl Spencer (1799 ship) was a Brazilian-built ship that enters Lloyd's Register in 1799. She made two seal-hunting voyages to South Georgia between 1799 and 1802, being wrecked there on the second.
  - Earl Spencer (1800 ship) was a French prize that became a privateer in 1800. After the Peace of Amiens she became a merchant vessel that traded between London and Gibraltar. She apparently was condemned then, perhaps after having received damage at Gibraltar.
  - Earl Spencer (1801) was a ship of 235 tons (bm), launched at Newfoundland in 1801. In 1802 her master was Captain G. Craft, and her owner B. Lester. Although the Register of Shipping has her trade as Portsmouth–Newfoundland, on 9 March 1802 Lloyd's List reported that she had wrecked at Gibraltar on her way from Newfoundland. The Register has the notation "Lost" against her name. However, this appears to be an error as Lloyd's Register continues to carry her through 1808 as trading to Newfoundland under Craft's command. However, another Earl Spencer, with trade London–Gibraltar, is last listed in 1803.
  - PS Earl Spencer, a ferry for the Isle of Wight beginning service in 1833
  - PS Earl Spencer (1874) was a paddle steamer passenger vessel that the London and North Western Railway operated from 1877 to 1896.
- Hired armed vessels: The British Royal Navy employed under contract three vessels named Earl Spencer, two of which, both cutters, served at the same time between 1799 and 1801. A third, variously referred to as a tender or cutter, served from 1803 to 1814.
  - Hired armed cutter Earl Spencer
