= HMS Hardi (1797) =

UK naval sloop 1797–1800

History

France
- Name: Hardi
- Launched: c.1795
- Commissioned: October 1796
- Captured: April 1797

Great Britain
- Name: HMS Hardi
- Acquired: April 1797 by capture
- Fate: Sold 1800

General characteristics .
- Length: Overall: 112 ft 2 in (34.2 m); Keel: 89 ft 0 in (27.1 m)
- Beam: 30 ft 6 in (9.3 m)
- Depth of hold: 13 ft 6 in (4.1 m)
- Propulsion: Sails
- Complement: 130 (at capture)
- Armament: 18 × 8-pounder long guns (at capture)

HMS Hardi was built at Cowes c. 1795 for Spanish owners. In 1796, she became the French privateer Hardi. The Royal Navy captured her in 1797 and sold her in 1800.

Florentin Lavallée commissioned Hardi at Brest in October 1796. She was armed with eighteen 8-pounder guns and had a crew of 130–164 men, under the command of Captain Cousin.

In February 1797 Hardi, Captain Cousell, captured Antelope. Antelope had been sailing from Charleston to London when she was taken. (Note: Cousell was actually William Cowell, an American, not above preying on American vessels as well as English. On 11 October 1798, he was captain of the French privateer Valour, which the British privateer Lord Hawke captured.)

Late in March 1797, Vice-Admiral Lord Kingsmill received intelligence that a French cruiser had been seen off the Skellocks on the coast of Ireland. Kingsmill dispatched HMS Hazard on 28 March, and on 1 April Hazard found the French vessel. After a chase of seven hours, Hazard caught her quarry, but only because the privateer had lost both topmasts. The privateer was the brig Hardi, of 18 guns and 130 men. (Another source gives her complement as 164 men.) Hardi had been built at Cowes, about two years earlier, for the Spaniards. Hardi had left Brest on 17 March and during her cruise had escaped two British frigates that had chased her. She had captured only one prize, a small Portuguese vessel of little value. Hazard took Hardie to Cork. Hardie arrived at Portsmouth on 16 April.

The Navy acquired Hardi, and classified her as a sloop of 18 guns. There is no record of her having seen active service.
