= Lord Hawke (1798 ship) =

History

Great Britain
- Name: Lord Hawke
- Namesake: Baron Hawke
- Builder: Ostend
- Launched: 1793
- Captured: c. May 1799

France
- Name: Revanche
- Namesake: Revenge
- Acquired: 1799 by purchase of prize
- Captured: 28 July 1800

Great Britain
- Name: Lord Hawke
- Acquired: September 1800 by purchase of a prize
- Fate: Foundered 1801

General characteristics
- Tons burthen: 113, or 11344/94, or 114, or 123 (bm)
- Length: 80 ft 7 1/4 in (24.6 m)
- Beam: 19 ft 3 1/4 in (5.9 m)
- Depth: 8 ft 5 in (2.6 m)
- Sail plan: Schooner
- Complement: 1998 (British privateer):50; 1799 (French privateer):80; 1801 (British letter of marque):18
- Armament: 1998 (British privateer):8 × 4-pounder guns + 4 × 12-pounder carronades + 4 swivel guns; 1799 (French privateer): 14 × 6-pounder guns; 1801 (British letter of marque): 10 × 4-pounder guns

Lord Hawke was launched at Ostend in 1793, almost certainly under a different name. In 1798 she became a British privateer. The French captured her in 1799 and she became the French privateer Revanche. The British Royal Navy recaptured her in 1800. New owners returned her to her original British name. She disappeared in early 1801, presumed to have foundered with all hands.

== British privateer ==
Lord Hawke first appeared in Lloyd's Register (LR) in 1799. Captain Pendock Neale acquired a letter of marque on 20 July 1798, and Lord Hawke began sailing out of Dartmouth as a privateer.

Year	Master	Owner	Trade	Source & notes
1799	P.Neal	Tomlinson	Dartmouth privateer	LR; small repairs 1799

On 24 August 1798 Mary and Elizabeth, Diamond, master, came into Plymouth. She had been sailing from London to Lisbon when on 7 August the French privateer Heureux Decide captured her at 46°26′N 12°30′W. (Note: Heureux Décidé was a privateer from Bordeaux commissioned by Pierre Cambon in February 1798. She operated on the Gulf of Biscay.) Lord Hawke had recaptured Mary and Elizabeth on 16 August. Her cargo included 22 casks (about two tons), of cochineal.

Argo, Smith, master, also arrived at Plymouth on 24 August. Lord Hawke had detained Argo as Argo was sailing from Nantes to New York. Another report had Argo as a Prussian brig from Embden, and carrying brandy from Bordeaux to Bremen. A third report had the Prussian brig Argo, Albert Smith, master, carrying brandy, glass, iron, and cloth from Nantes to New York. Prize money for Argo was paid in December 1802. (Note: Argo's cargo was auctioned on 14 November 1799. The auction advertisement had an informative detailed list of all that was on offer.)

On 11 September the Spanish packet Edad Denon came into Plymouth. She had been returning to Spain from Veracruz when Lord Hawke had captured her. A letter published in the London Gazette by the captain of HMS Nymphe, states that on 6 September Nymphe, in company with Aurora and Lord Hawke, had captured L'Edad de Oro, which had sailed from La Guaira, Venezuela, and Havana with a cargo of cocoa. She was bound for Corunna and the British captured her six miles from the Corunna light house. The actual captor was Lord Hawke, which used her sweeps to come up first and take L'Edad de Oro. Nymphe escorted Edad Dono into Plymouth and a naval officer carried the dispatches to the Admiralty in London. Edad Dono, Manuel Cexxo, master, had been carrying mails from Havana. The Spanish threw them overboard, but a sailor from Lord Hawke jumped from her bow and retrieved them before they sank. Edad Dono, of about 200 tons (bm), was believed to be worth £25,000.

The capture of Edad de Oro resulted in Lord Hawke having no problem raising a crew for her next cruise. It also resulted in litigation with Neale and Lord Hawke's owner, and crew contending that Nymphe and Aurora were effectively not in sight at the time of the capture and so not entitled to share in the proceeds. They contended that the capture took place on a clear day and that all that was visible from Lord Hawke's deck was the top reefs of the topsails of the two navy ships. Nymphe was 16 miles west and to windward at the time of the capture, and Aurora 16 miles to leeward. (Note: Nicholas Tomlinson, formerly commander of the brig HMS Suffisante, was Lord Hawke's owner, and possibly on board at the time. He was criticised for being both a naval officer (though not at the time assigned to a vessel), and the owner of a privateer. The prize court upheld the claims by Nymphe and Aurora. Tomlinson published a letter that was reprinted in the Naval Chronicle defending his owenership and including an extract from Nymphe's log that makes clear that she was not present at the capture, did not know when it had taken place, had not heard Lord Hawke's shots and broadside, and made no mention of Aurora being in sight. The letter further makes clear that Captain Percy Fraser of Nymphe had used extortionate threats to force Neale to sign a document accepting Fraser's account of capture. Fraser's behavior is, of course, completely understandable as there was apparently a great deal of money at stake. Tomlinson was later taken off the list of post captains, ostensibly for inattention for not answering signals from Nymphe when Nymphe was in sight. A later report states that Tomlinson had been struck for using a private signal while on Lord Hawke, but that he had been restored to the list in recognition of his "very eminent services".) (Note: Edad de Oro was auctioned off on 14 December 1798. The auction advertisement described her as having a burthen of 21917/94 tons, 85 ft 10 in (26.2 m) in length and 24 ft 1 in (7.3 m) in breadth. It described her as having a hold depth of 10 ft 7 in (3.2 m) and ship-rigged and outfitted as a packet, with appropriate passenger accommodations. It will require original research to discover who purchased her and what her new owner named her.)

By end-September, Lord Hawke had made nine captures and had destroyed a French privateer by driving the privateer ashore at Corunna. The prizes consisted of Edad Dono, four Spanish brigs carrying wheat, sugar, and coffee, two Spanish chasse marées, a Prussian vessel carrying brandy, and a vessel carrying 22 casks of cochineal. The privateer Lord Hawke had destroyed had 22 oars, six brass swivel guns, and 42 men.

On 11 October a French privateer cutter of two guns and 40 men came into Plymouth. The privateer was a prize to Lord Hawke. By another account, the privateer was the brig Valeur, of eight guns and 48 men. A third account gave the French privateer's name as Valour (or Vailleur), and stated that she was the former smuggler Vertumnus, of Fowey, which had been captured while coming from Guernsey. Valour had thrown her guns overboard during the chase. She was 10 days out of Brest, and had made no captures. Lord Hawke put Valour's French crew ashore in Spain before bringing her into Plymouth. Valour's captain was William Cowell, an American, as were two of her lieutenants. (Note: Cowell had been captain of the French privateer Hardi when he captured the American vessel Antelope.)

A few days earlier, Lord Hawke had repelled an attack by a privateer brig of 16 guns off St Andero. After a two-hour engagement the French privateer had sailed away. Lord Hawke had had four men wounded and her sails and rigging were damaged. Another account reported that the enemy privateer had been armed with eighteen 12-pounder guns. Lord Hawke would have captured the brig but for a fire that broke out in Lord Hawke's magazine. The confusion that had resulted in the efforts to prevent Lord Hawke from blowing up gave the enemy the opportunity to escape. A third report had some of Lord Hawke's crew jumping overboard; fortunately there were no deaths. By this report, the only casualty was Lord Hawke's doctor, who was wounded, and who returned to Plymouth aboard Vailleur. Lord Hawke then sailed towards the Mediterranean. However, the crew objected and Lord Hawke returned to England, arriving at first at Mevagissey.

On 17 October Engelen (or Eugelon), Johnson, master came into Plymouth. She had been sailing from Barcelona to Altona when Lord Hawke had detained her. The Danish brig Engelen, Osten Johansen, master, had been carrying brandy and wind. She had been intercepted near Corunna.

In early December Lord Hawke brought into Plymouth John, of Poole. John had been sailing from Newfoundland with a cargo of oil and fish when a French privateer of 14 guns captured her. Lord Hawke recaptured John on 30 November. John arrived at Plymouth on 3 December.

On 17 December Handehesteka (or Kamschatka) came into Plymouth. Lord Hawke had captured Handehesteka as she was sailing from Hambro to Tranquebar. Lord Hawke convoyed her prize as far as Scilly before leaving her and returning to cruising.

Lloyd's List reported in May 1799 that a French privateer of 18 guns and 80 men had captured Lord Hawke, Neale master. Her captors sent Lord Hawke into Passages. The French privateer was Victoire, of eighteen 12-pounder guns and 150 men (plus 40 soldiers). Lord Hawke had captured a Spanish brig and to give the prize time to get away, Neale engaged Victoire. After 45 minutes Neale struck. Lord Hawke had had one man killed and five dangerously wounded. She was short-handed as HMS Sylph and HMS Mermaid had pressed some of her crew. Victoire took Lord Hawke and her prize into Bayonne. (Note: Victoire was a 300-ton ("of load") privateer brig from Bayonne commissioned in 1799. She cruised under a Captain Dambouyer (or Damborgez), with 12 officers and 100 to 103 men, with 18 guns. HMS Révolutionnaire captured Victoire on 30 May 1799. The Gazette National or Moniteur Universal, Tridi, 3 floréal, an 7, No.213, p.365, cited news from Bordeaux dated 24 Germinal, that Victoire, Citoyen Damouyer, master, had captured the English privateer l'amiral Hawke and her prize, a Spanish brig, and had brought both into the port of Passage.) (Note: Neale went on to command another privateer, Earl Spencer)

== French privateer ==
French sources show Revanche as a 70-ton privateer schooner commissioned in Bayonne in 1800. She was armed with 14 gun and had a crew of three to 10 officers and 24 to 70 men, all under the command of Captain J. Hiriart. She had been equipped at Bayonne by M.Pêche.

On 28 July 1800, HMS Uranie captured the French privateer schooner Revanche. Revanche was 19 days out of Vigo and had already captured and sent in the English brig Marcus, a Portuguese ship, and a Spanish brig that had been a prize to Minerve. Sirius shared in the capture. The capture of Revanche took place off Cape Ortegal. Another account states that she had taken four prizes, two English and two Portuguese vessels. Revanche came into Plymouth on 5 August.

Revanche was auctioned on 12 September 1800 at Plymouth.

== British letter of marque ==
Captain Thomas Geary acquired a letter of marque on 10 February 1801.

== Fate ==
In October 1801 Lloyd's List reported that the "Armed schooner" Lord Hawke had sailed from Waterford on 13 April, bound for the West Indies. She had not been heard of since.
