= Henry Gwillim =

British judge (c. 1759 – 1837)

Sir Henry Gwillim (c. 1759 – 12 September 1837, Staplefield, Sussex) was a British lawyer and judge who served as a puisne judge in the Supreme Court of Madras (now Chennai) from 1801-1808.

== Early life and career in England ==
Born in 1759 in Hereford to a family of Welsh origins, Henry was the eldest son of John Gwillim, a respected surgeon and apothecary who also served as Mayor and Alderman of the City. Gwillim attended Christ Church, Oxford, and graduated in 1779. In 1780, he was admitted to Middle Temple, one of the four Inns of Court, to study law. He was called to the Bar in 1787. During this period, he and Elizabeth Symonds were married at St Bride’s Church, London in 1784. Elizabeth was also from Hereford. The couple were to have a daughter, who died before her first birthday. Two further children were born in the following few years. However, neither made it past early childhood.

In 1794, Gwillim was appointed as Chief Justice of the Isle of Ely, where he attended to his duties with much regularity, presiding over the assize courts in both Ely and Wisbech. During this time, he was elected as a member of the Society for the Encouragement of Arts, Manufacturers and Commerce (now the Royal Society of Arts).

== Works ==
During his time in London and Ely, Gwillim wrote, edited and published several legal treatises, which showcase his interest not only in administering the law, but also in codifying it.

These works included:

- A New Abridgment of the Law. By Matthew Bacon, of the Middle Temple, Esq. The Fifth Edition, Corrected; with considerable additions, Including the Latest Authorities; By Henry Gwillim, of the Middle Temple Esq. Barrister at Law. In seven volumes. (1798).
- A charge delivered to the grand jury, at the Assizes holden at Ely, on Wednesday the 27th day of March 1799. By Henry Gwillim, Esq. chief justice of the Isle of Ely. Published at the request of the magistrates and grand jury. (1799).
- A collection of acts and records of Parliament, with reports of cases, argued and determined in the courts of law and equity, respecting tithes. In Four Volumes. (1801).

== Appointment to India ==
In 1801, Gwillim was appointed puisne judge to the newly created Supreme Court of Madras, which had been created by charter of George III the previous year. Along with Gwillim, Sir Benjamin Sullivan was also appointed as a puisne judge, while Sir Thomas Andrew Lumisden Strange was appointed as Chief Justice. In February 1801, Gwillim, along with his wife Elizabeth and her sister Mary Symonds, boarded the Hindostan and departed for India. In June of that year, Gwillim officially received his knighthood, no doubt postponed due to the King’s illness.

The creation of the Supreme Court of Madras was part of a wider issue stemming from the East India Company’s (EIC) contentious handlings of its affairs, who, at this time, were the ruling executive authority of British India. The EIC had been the British government’s representative since 1600, and throughout the following centuries, the Company acquired control of large territories and the right to levy taxes in the region. Throughout the late eighteenth century, the British government attempted to tighten its control over the EIC territories, and this included directly appointing judges to dispense English law.

The creation of these courts caused jurisdictional conflicts, and Gwillim would suffer the consequences of these struggles. The Supreme Court, or the "King’s Court," remained a separate body from the EIC. Unlike the local courts controlled by the EIC, the Supreme Court assumed legal and political authority separate from the EIC, with its judges being appointed directly by the Crown. For the citizens of Madras, this court was distinct from the "colonial executive power." Indeed, the court was used by citizens to challenge the EIC, and the EIC viewed the existence of the court as a threat to its sovereignty.

Within this court, unlike in the EIC controlled rural courts, Indians were protected by English law, with its rights such as Habeas corpus.

Amid these growing tensions, Gwillim presided over Madras as a judge. With Sullivan often in poor health, and Strange ill or away, Gwillim became, according to his wife, the "backbone of the court." With his occasional bad temper, Gwillim did not always act with tact, making powerful enemies in the process. In 1804, amidst the EIC’s growing concerns over the Supreme Court’s use of English law, Gwillim had a personal falling out with the Governor of Madras, Lord William Bentinck, over the administration of a trust fund, as well as a dispute about the appointment of two court officials. Following these events, Bentinck stated that any communications between the two men must be made by third parties. While Gwillim was initially on good terms with his fellow judge, Chief Justice Strange, by 1805, relations between the two men were also strained, as Strange had familial connections through marriage with the EIC.

The growing tensions came to a head in 1807. Following the Vellore Rising, Lord Bentinck planned to establish a new, local police force under military command in Madras to maintain the EIC’s control. This police force was to have wide powers of arrest, with no obligation to bring those arrested before the Supreme Court. Gwillim denounced this force, seeing it as oppressive and tending to despotism. Strange, on the other hand, supported Lord Bentinck’s proposals. Locals also criticized the government’s police reform, sending in a petition to the government, which the Supreme Court supported.

On 21 January 1807, Gwillim spoke in front of a Grand Jury of Europeans, insulting both Bentinck and the new police force. The next month, Gwillim challenged the legality of the arrest of an Indian man by the military police. Gwillim criticized the fact that the force was led by a military officer, Walter Grant. He argued that Madras was effectively "living under a military power". The Grand Jury agreed, declaring that a military force "cannot legally be employed" for this purpose. Furious, Lord Bentinck would argue that the sentiment was applicable to Great Britain, but not Madras. Grant was later to resign and be replaced by Captain James Grant. Walter Grant complained that Gwillim’s criticism of him was detrimental to the EIC’s control of the city. In July 1807, Gwillim further enraged the EIC authorities by publishing Sir Henry Gwillim’s Charge to the Grand Jury, at Madras, 10th July, 1807 without presenting it before the government censor. In it, he complained of Captain James Grant and declared that the present system of law enforcement was placing the city’s liberties "at the feet of a military despot."

On top of Gwillim’s complaints about the police force, he came under further fire from the EIC that year as he was suspected of issuing a writ of habeas corpus to release an Indian man accused of conspiring to rebel against the government. The EIC authorities increasingly began to view the Supreme Court as a bastion for radicalism.

For lawyers such as Gwillim, however, these ideas were not radical. He simply believed that Indians coming within the jurisdiction of the court were entitled to habeas corpus under English law. Otherwise, it amounted to despotism. This belief was problematic for the EIC who thought that judicial affairs in India should always be in a "state of emergency" — that is, people could be detained without due process— in defence of state security. As such, the EIC continued to view the Court and Gwillim with suspicion. Certainly, the police officer Captain Grant would complain that Gwillim’s house was a refuge for the most dangerous sorts in Madras.

Due to these events, the EIC argued that Gwillim was dangerous to the "public safety" of the city, and they began to lobby for his removal as judge. Both Strange and Bentinck proceeded to submit formal complaints against Gwillim to the Crown in London. While Bentinck’s complaints have been discussed above, Strange complained of various procedural points, such as appointing Indian legal experts to assist when subjects were beyond English law. Strange also complained of the use of the Court Seal by the puisne judges for non-judicial matters, arguing that it was against his authority. Bentinck, with the support of Strange, also began to scheme to remove the Supreme Court and replace it with provincial courts, headed by one Crown-appointed judge and two EIC-appointed judges.

In September, however, Lord Bentinck was removed from his post as Governor of Madras, due to his failure to prevent the Vellore Rising. Nevertheless, it was too late for Gwillim as the complaints against him had already been sent. In October 1807, an Order in Council was issued that Gwillim should return to London for investigation. An official recall was issued the next month. He acknowledged receipt of the order in June 1808.

Due to his conflicts with the EIC, Gwillim’s legacy has been mixed. However, by all accounts he was an impartial judge, and did his job with due diligence. Indeed, upon the news of his removal, Gwillim was presented with a valedictory address signed by 1006 "Descendants of Europeans and Native Inhabitants of Madras", thanking him for his "indefatigable exertions to make the laws known and respected, and to support [them] in [their] liberties and rights." The following week, he would receive another address from a group composed entirely of Indians, with 240 signatories, thanking him for his impartiality. He would receive a third delegation with 400 signatories on the day of his departure.

In October 1808, Gwillim and his sister-in-law, Mary Symonds, boarded the Phoenix and set sail for England, arriving in May 1809. His wife, Elizabeth, had died the previous December. Once in England, his case was reviewed by the Crown, and, on 11 April 1810, the Privy Council announced that Gwillim would not return to his seat in Madras, although an allowance would be granted to him.

== Later life ==
Following these events, Gwillim settled in Staplefield, near Cuckfield, Sussex at Staplefield Place. He continued to work as a judge at the Sussex Assizes, while also drawing from his pension from India of £100 a year. In 1812, he married Elizabeth Chilman of Clerkenwell St. James, a woman thirty years his junior. They had one daughter together. Henry continued to work as a local judge for the next two decades.

On 12 September 1837, Gwillim died aged 79 in Staplefield, Sussex.
