= Latona (1789 ship) =

History

Great Britain
- Name: Latona
- Namesake: Leto
- Owner: 1789:John & Francis Barry; Subsequently:Various
- Builder: John Barry
- Launched: 1789
- Fate: Wrecked 6 February 1842

General characteristics
- Tons burthen: 292, or 295, or 297, or 300, (bm)
- Length: Overall:95 ft 9 in (29.2 m); Keel:75 ft 4 in (23.0 m)
- Beam: 27 ft 0 in (8.2 m)
- Propulsion: Sail
- Complement: 26
- Armament: 1794: 10 × 4-pounder guns; 1800: 10 × 4-pounder guns; 1810:6 × 18-pounder carronades
- Notes: Three decks

Latona was launched at Whitby in 1789. She made one voyage for the British East India Company (EIC), one as a slave ship in the triangular trade in enslaved people, and one as a whaling ship in the southern whale fishery. She spent the rest of her career as a merchantman. She was wrecked in February 1842.

== Career ==
Latona was launched in 1789 at Whitby. Although some records state 1790, this is when she was sold to London investors and registered there.

One source has suggested that it was a different Latona that made a voyage for the EIC. The data from Lloyd's Register supports that it was the Whitby Latona that made the voyage.

Year	Master	Owner	Trade	Notes
1790	F. Barry; J. Ranter	Barry (Senior); W. Christopher	Hull–Petersburth; London–Virginia	Launched in 1789 at Whitby
1793	J. Ranter	Christopher	London–Virginia	
1794	J. Ranter; H. Christopher	Christopher	London–Virginia; London–Bengal	Launched in 1789 at Whitby

EIC voyage (1794-1795): On 3 June 1794 Captain Henry Christopher acquired a letter of marque. Before she was ready for a voyage for the EIC, Hill repaired her. Before Latona left England, the Court of Directors had agreed that she would be allowed to stop at Madeira.

On 25 June, Gilbert Ferguson and William Gillett certified to the EIC's Court of Directors that before she, and seven other vessels, had left the Thames, "everything was done, that in our opinion was necessary, to make them sufficiently strong to bring home a cargo from India".

Christopher sailed from Plymouth on 22 June. Latona reached the Cape of Good Hope on 8 October, and arrived at Calcutta on 15 February 1795. On her way home she reached St Helena on 5 August. On 3 September she sailed from St Helena. She sailed together with Boddam, Rockingham, and Indian Trader, and a number of other vessels, all under the escort of HMS Hector. Latona arrived at The Downs on 25 November.

For reasons that are obscure as of February 2023, Latona disappeared from Lloyd's Register for several years. She was listed in Lloyd's Register in 1800 and in the Register of Shipping for 1800, the year in which this register started publication.

Year	Master	Owner	Trade	Source & notes
1800	Fotheringham; G. Young	W. Dodds	London–Jamaica	LR; Launched in 1790 at Whitby
1801	G. Young; Blair; J.Smith	W. Dodds	London–Jamaica	LR; new deck and small repairs 1801
1802	J.Smith; Greenleaf	W. Dodds	London–Jamaica	LR; new deck and small repairs 1801

Enslaving voyage (1801–1802): In 1801 Captain John Smith made one enslaving voyage. He sailed from London on 22 November 1801. He acquired captives at Cape Coast Castle and Latona sailed from Africa on 29 April 1801. She arrived at Havana on 15 July with 283 captives. She arrived back at London on 7 October.

In 1803 she returned to the Jamaica trade.

Year	Master	Owner	Trade	Source & notes
1805	Greenleaf	W. Dodds	London–Jamaica	
1810	Hannah	Barkworth	Hull transport	Good repair 1808
1815	Hannah	Barkworth	Hull transport	
1818	D. Cherry; J. Donovan	Barkworth	Hull–Quebec; London–South Seas	Good repair 1816
1819	Donovan	Barkworth	London–South Seas	

Whaling voyage (1818–1820): Captain Donovan (or Denamon, or Dennaman, or Denniman) sailed from England on 30 January 1818, bound for the Isle of Desolation. She was at Desolation Island on 7 March 1819 and at the Galapagos in November. She returned to England on 5 October 1820.

Year	Master	Owner	Trade	Notes
1820	Donovan	Barkworth	London–South Seas	
1822	Donovan; Thompson; Paterson	Barkworth; Patterson	London–South seas London–Shields; London–Quebec	Launched in 1799 at Whitby
1825	Patterson	Patterson	Liverpool–Riga	Launched in 1799 at Whitby
1830	Patterson	Patterson	London–Quebec	Small repair 1830

The Register of Shipping last published in 1833. The data below are from Lloyd's Register

Year	Master	Owner	Trade	Notes
1835	J. Taylor	Young & Son	Newcastle–Quebec	Large repair 1834; Launched in 1790 at Whitby; Homeport Newcastle
1840	W.Sutton	Young & Son	London–Quebec	Homeport South Shields
1841	W.Sutton	Young & Son	London–Quebec; Shields-Mediterranean	Large repair 1841 some repairs 1841

== Fate ==
On 6 February 1842, Latona, Sutton, master, was coming from Alexandria when she struck the bar at Courtmacsherry, County Cork. She was driven ashore and wrecked.

The entry for Latona in the 1841 volume of Lloyd's Register is marked "wrecked".
