= Lord Duncan (1798 ship) =

History

Great Britain
- Name: Lord Duncan
- Namesake: Adam Duncan, 1st Viscount Duncan
- Launched: 1798, New Brunswick
- Fate: Captured 28 February 1804

General characteristics
- Tons burthen: 231 (bm)
- Armament: 1799: 16 × 4-pounder guns; 1802: 2 × 4-pounder guns

Lord Duncan was launched in New Brunswick in 1798. She transferred to Britain circa 1799. A French privateer captured her in 1800 but the Royal Navy recaptured her. A second French privateer captured her in 1804 and took her into Guadeloupe.

== Career ==
Lord Duncan first appeared in Lloyd's Register (LR) in the volume for 1799.

Year	Master	Owner	Trade	Source
1799	Cameron; Robert Lyon	Buchanan; R.Miller	Greenock–New Providence; Greenock–St Kitts	LR

The French privateer Brave captured Lord Duncan, Lyon, master. Lord Duncan, Robert Lyon, master, was carrying a cargo of sugar, rum, coffee, and cotton, from Antigua to Glasgow. However, the cutter Viper recaptured Lord Duncan, which arrived at Falmouth. The recapture took place on 27 June 1800, and at the time Viper was in company with Excellent. Captain Lyon on 7 July 1800, wrote a letter from Bordeaux. He reported that Brave, Captain Beck, had captured Lord Duncan on 27 May at 50°48′N 24°00′W. He also listed a number of other vessels that Brave had captured, including Latona.

Year	Master	Owner	Trade	Source
1801	R.Lyon; A.Miller	R.Miller; J.Miller	Greenock–New Providence	LR
1802	A.Miller	J.Miller	Greenock–New York; London–Antigua	LR
1803	A.Miller; M.Alderson	J.Miller; William Boyd	Greenock–Antigua; London–St Vincent	LR

== Fate ==
On 28 February 1804 Lord Duncan was on her way from London to St Vincents and in the latitude of Barbados when she encountered the French privateer Grand Decidé. The privateer took Lord Duncan into Guadeloupe. (Note: Grand Décidé was a privateer under Mathieu Goy, commissioned in Guadeloupe in January 1804.)
