= Latona (1786 ship) =

History

Great Britain
- Name: Latona
- Namesake: Leto
- Launched: 1786, Newcastle upon Tyne
- Fate: Abandoned sinking in 1835
- Notes: This vessel is sometimes conflated with Latona

General characteristics
- Tons burthen: 292, or 29211/94; later 306, or 308, or 309 (bm)
- Length: 96 ft 0 in (29.3 m)
- Beam: 27 ft 9 in (8.5 m)
- Sail plan: Snow
- Armament: 1795: 4 × 6-pounder guns; 1815: 4 × 4-pounder guns

Latona was launched in 1786 at Newcastle upon Tyne. She spent her entire career as a merchantman. In 1800 a privateer captured her, but a British privateer recaptured her quickly. She foundered in 1835.

== Career ==
Latona entered Lloyd's Register (LR) in 1787 with John Hall, master, and W. Lashly, owner, and trade London–Petersburg.

Year	Master	Owner	Trade
1790	J. Hall	Lashly	London
1795	Fothergill	Lashly	London–Petersburg
1800	J. Lyon	J. Lyon	London–Memel

On 22 August 1800, Lloyd's List reported that the British privateer Earl Spencer had recaptured Latona, which a French privateer had captured as Latona was sailing from Memel to Lisbon. Earl Spencer sent Latona into Oporto. (Note: Latona was one of the vessels that the privateer Brave, Captain Beck, captured when Brave also captured Lord Duncan.)

Year	Master	Owner	Trade	Notes
1805	R. Fenwick	J. Lyons	Dublin–Memel	
1810	Simpson	J. Lyons	Yarmouth–Shields	Damage repaired 1809
1815	Simpson	J. Lyons	Yarmouth–Shields	Damage repaired 1809
1820	W. Robinson	Capt. & Co.	Plymouth	Large repair 1816; thorough repair 1817
1825	T. Christie	Robinson (Note: William Robinson & Ann Watson, North Shields acquired Latona on 7 March 1825.)	Liverpool–"Mrmc"	306 tons (bm)
1830	Robinson	Robinson	London–Quebec	Damage repaired 1826; 308 tons (bm)
1835	R. Carter	Carter (Note: Robert Carter, of London, acquired Latona on 28 March 1832. He registered her at London on 29 March.)	London–Quebec	309 tons (bm)

== Fate ==
Latona sprang a leak on 1 September 1835, resulting in her crew abandoning her in the Atlantic Ocean on 3 September. Olga rescued her crew. Latona was on a voyage from Padstow, Cornwall to Quebec City, Lower Canada.
