= Indian Trader (1819 ship) =

History

United Kingdom
- Name: Indian Trader
- Builder: J. Thomas, Howrah by Calcutta
- Launched: 19 July 1819
- Fate: Lost 1822

General characteristics
- Tons burthen: 294, or 494 (bm)
- Propulsion: Sail

Indian Trader was launched in July 1819.

Under the Mediterranean Trade Act, several country ships (vessels that traded only east of the Cape of Good Hope), received licenses to carry rice from Calcutta and Penang to Malta. In 1821, Indian Trader was taken up to carry 7000 maunds of rice and 450 maunds of ghee "for the native troops serving there." (Note: The source is not explicit but subsequent sentences suggest that the native troops were serving in Penang.)

Loss: Indian Trader was lost in May 1822 at Tauman, on the west coast of Sumatra. Lloyd's List reported that she was driven on shore on 14 May at Trumoon Beach and totally lost. She had been carrying a cargo of pepper for the Bencoolen Government on account of the British East India Company (EIC). Her crew was saved. A slightly fuller account states that a squall upset her and drove her aground. She had been carrying 6000 peculs of pepper for the account of the EIC, the Bencoolen government having chartered her to collect it. The same account states that one sick lascar died in the wreck.

The loss of Indian Trader was one of many misfortunes that occurred at Benkulen in its last years. One source suggests that the loss contributed to the EIC's abandonment of Benkulen in 1824.

One source appears to conflate this Indian Trader with the 1791 Indian Trader as it states that after she was abandoned to the underwriters she was salvaged, repaired, and sold to J. Somes & Co. In 1823 Somes did purchase an Indian Trader from "Ewart", but this was the 1791 Indian Trader.
