= Earl Spencer (1800 ship) =

History

Great Britain
- Name: Earl Spencer
- Owner: G. Arnold
- Acquired: c.1800 as a prize
- Fate: Condemned 1802

General characteristics
- Tons burthen: 150, or 163, or 16358/94 (bm)
- Length: 79 ft 3 1/2 in (24.2 m)
- Beam: 22 ft 5 1/4 in (6.8 m)
- Depth of hold: 8 ft 9 1/2 in (2.7 m)
- Propulsion: Sail
- Complement: 1800: 80; 1801:60
- Armament: 1800: 14 × 12-pounder carronades + 2 × 6-pounder chase guns; 1801: 14 × 12&6-pounder guns

Earl Spencer was the French privateer brig Aventurier, which the British Royal Navy captured in December 1799. The French prize became a British privateer in 1800. After the Peace of Amiens she became a merchant vessel that traded between London and Gibraltar. She apparently was condemned in 1802, perhaps after having received damage there.

== Career ==
On 29 December HMS Amethyst captured the French privateer brig Aventurier (or Avanture). Avanturier, out of Lorient, was armed with 14 guns and had a crew of 75 men. One month earlier, on 29 November, Aventurier had captured the American ship Cato and taken her master, John Parker, and his crew prisoner. When Amethyst captured Aventurier Cooke freed the Americans and informed Parker that Cato had been sent to Cork. Cooke sent Aventurier into Plymouth from where Parker and his mate traveled to Cork. Before she was captured, Aventurier, of L'Orient, had also captured an English ship coming from Newfoundland with a cargo of cod, oil, and fish. Aventurier sent her prize into Corunna.

Aventurier was offered for sale at Plymouth on 9 April 1800. On 14 April "the celebrated General Arnold" arrived at Plymouth to "fit out a letter of marque, late Aventurier, a fine corvette of 14 guns." Aventurier then became Earl Spencer.

Earl Spencer first appeared in the Register of Shipping for 1801 (published in late 1800). It stated that she was a French prize, her master was J.P. Neal, her owner was G. Arnold, and her trade was London cruizer, i.e., a privateer.

Captain Pendock Neale received a letter of marque on 10 May 1800. (Note: Captain Pendock Neale had been captain of the highly successful privateer Lord Hawke, which the French had captured in 1799.)

On 23 June the Spanish brig Maria del Mont Camille came into Plymouth, a prize to Earl Spencer. Maria del Mont Camille had been sailing from Guyon to Corunna with a cargo of coals and iron when she was captured. Reportedly, Earl Spencer had taken three other vessels that were expected to arrive within hours. Two were carrying naval stores and one was carrying wheat. Earl Spencer had fallen in with a fleet of 80 merchantmen from San Sebastian, escorted by frigates. The night was dark and Earl Spencer succeeded in cutting out the four prizes.

On 22 August Lloyd's List reported that the privateer Earl Spencer had recaptured Latona, which a privateer had captured as Latona was sailing from Memel to Lisbon. Earl Spencer sent Latona into Oporto.

Captain John Stewart received a letter of marque on 5 February 1801.

On 17 February 1801 the cargo of Margaritta Christina was auctioned at Portsmouth. Captain Neale had captured the Swedish ship, Hendrick Jausson, master, and sent her into Portsmouth.

On 29 March Mr. John Stewart, of the "Private Ship of War Earl Spencer" captured the French privateer lugger Huron at 42°4′N 9°10′W. Huron was armed with six 9-pounder and four 2-pounder brass guns, and four iron 6-pounder guns. She had a crew of 35 men. She was 59 days out of Bordeaux, in which time she had captured Jersey, M'Carthy, master, which had been sailing from Cork to Martinique. Stewart brought Huron and his prisoners into Lisbon.

Lloyd's Register (1803) reported Earl Spencer as having been condemned. Her master was given as W. Penny, her owner as Barnard & Co., and her trade London—Gibraltar.

On 9 March 1802 Lloyd's List reported that Earl Spencer, Craft, master, had wrecked at Gibraltar on her way from Newfoundland. The Register of Shipping has the notation "Lost" against this Earl Spencer's name. Lloyd's Register continued to carry her until 1808 with the stale information of trading with Newfoundland under Craft's command.
