= Earl Spencer (1799 ship) =

History

Great Britain
- Name: Earl Spencer
- Namesake: George Spencer, 2nd Earl Spencer
- Owner: John Hill, Paradise Row
- Builder: Brazil
- Acquired: 1799
- Fate: Wrecked late 1801 or early 1802

General characteristics
- Tons burthen: 509, 520, or 600 (bm)
- Propulsion: Sail
- Complement: 35
- Armament: 1799: 20 × 6-pounder guns + 6 swivel guns; 1802: 14 × 12-pounder + 6 × 6-pounder guns

Earl Spencer was built in Brazil. She entered Lloyd's Register in 1799, as foreign built, with later editions specifying "Brazil". She made two seal-hunting voyages to South Georgia between 1799 and 1802, being wrecked there on the second.

Captain William Beacon received a letter of marque for Earl Spencer on 3 August 1799. She was listed on the Protection List in 1799 and 1800; the lists protected the crews of certain vessels, such as whalers, from impressment, at least on the outbound leg of a voyage.

Earl Spencer sailed in 1800, to South Georgia on her first sealing voyage. At the time of her visit she was the largest vessel to have visited to that date. Lloyd's List reported on 2 May 1800, that Earl Spencer was at South Georgia. She was reported to be returning from the South Seas on 22 December 1800, dismasted and leaky. She put into Plymouth, having lost her masts in a heavy gale on the 13th. She was carrying 500 tons of spermaceti oil and seal skins. She finally returned to London on 3 February 1801.

Earl Spencer sailed a second time for South Georgia on 15 May 1801, under the command of Captain William Beacon (or Bacon, or Beyton). She was lost there towards the end of 1801 or early 1802, when she drifted from her anchors and was wrecked. (Note: Lloyd's List (LL) reported the loss on 16 February 1802. Contra some accounts, it did not occur on that day.) However, the crew was saved. She was valued at £8,000.

The Register of Shipping for 1802, gave the name of her master as W. Beaton, and had the notation "LOST" against her name. Earl Spencer was last listed in Lloyd's Register for 1803 (published in 1802).
