= Philip Barrow =

English medical writer

Philip Barrow or Barrough (fl. 1590) was an English medical writer.

Barrow was the son of John Barrow, of Suffolk. He obtained from the university of Cambridge, in 1559, a licence to practise chirurgery, and in 1572 a similar licence to practise physic. It is probable that he practised his profession in London. He is the author of the Method of Phisicke, containing the Causes, Signs, and Cures of Inward Diseases in Man's Body from head to foot. Where unto is added the form and rule of working remedies and medicines, which our Physicians commonly use at this day, with the proportion, quantity, and names of such medicines, London, 1590, 4to. This popular work, which is dedicated to the author's "singular good lord and master", the Lord Burghley, reached at least its seventh edition in 1652. The impression of 1617 is called the fifth edition. There is in the British Museum an interleaved copy of it, with many manuscript notes.
