= George Samuel =

English painter

George Samuel (died c. 1823) was an English landscape-painter, working in both in oils and watercolours. He was a noted topographical draughtsman of his day.

== Life ==
Samuel exhibited annually at the Royal Academy from 1786 to 1823, and also largely at the British Institution, his works being of the scenery of Cornwall, Westmorland, and other picturesque parts of England. He was a member of Thomas Girtin's sketching society in 1799, and one of the earliest workers in lithography. His death, in or soon after 1823, was accidental, caused by an old wall falling on him while he was sketching.

== Works ==
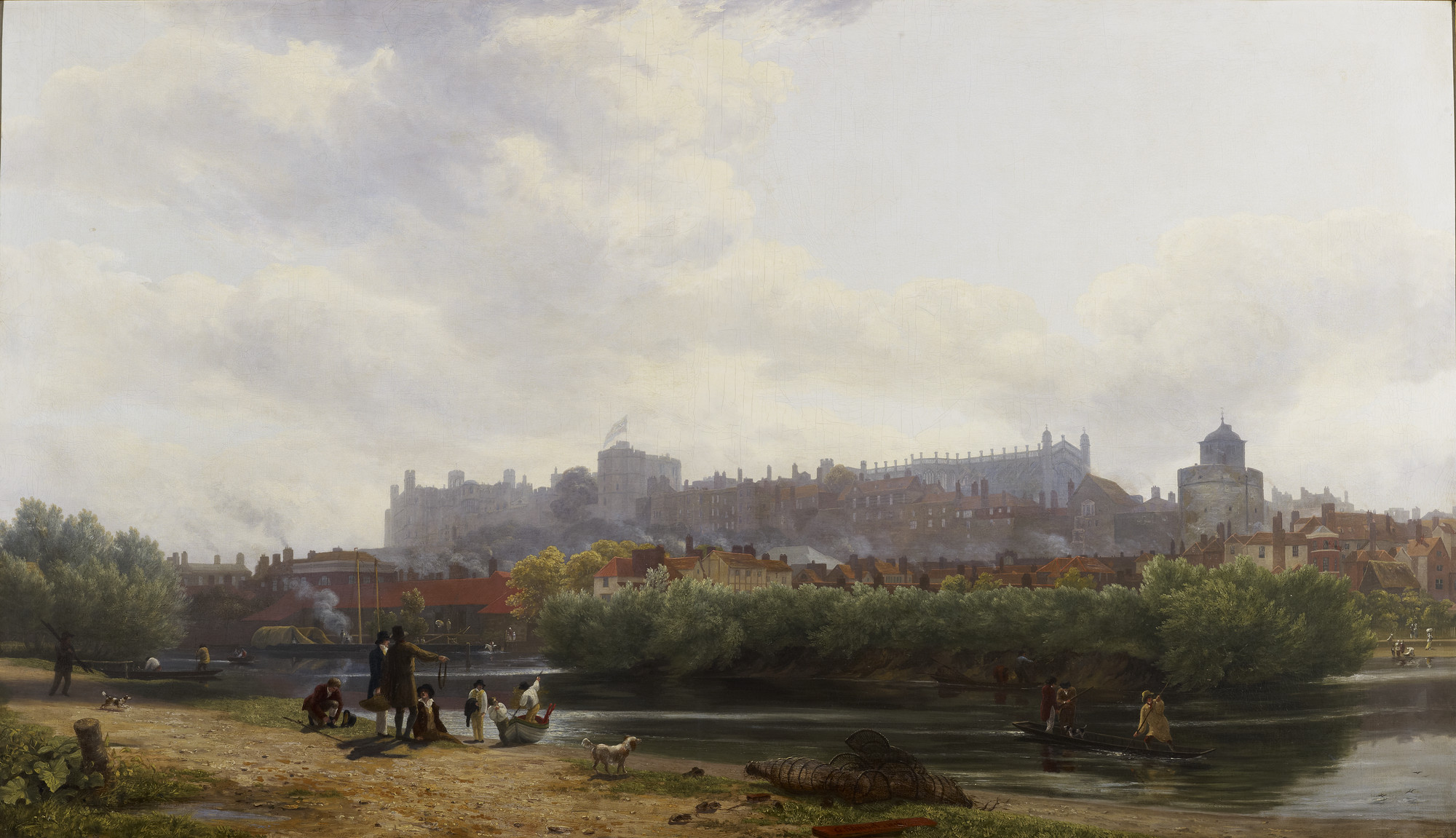
View of Windsor Castle, by George Samuel, 1816

In 1789 Samuel painted a view of the River Thames from Rotherhithe during the great frost, which attracted attention. His view of Holland House was engraved in William Angus's Select Views of Seats, that of Windsor Castle in William Henry Pyne's Royal Residences; and others in the Copperplate Magazine (1792) and The Itinerant (1799) by the engraver John Walker. His watercolours were influenced by Paul Sandby.

Samuel also made in 1799 the designs for the illustrations to Grove Hill, a poem describing the residence of John Coakley Lettsome, by Thomas Maurice.

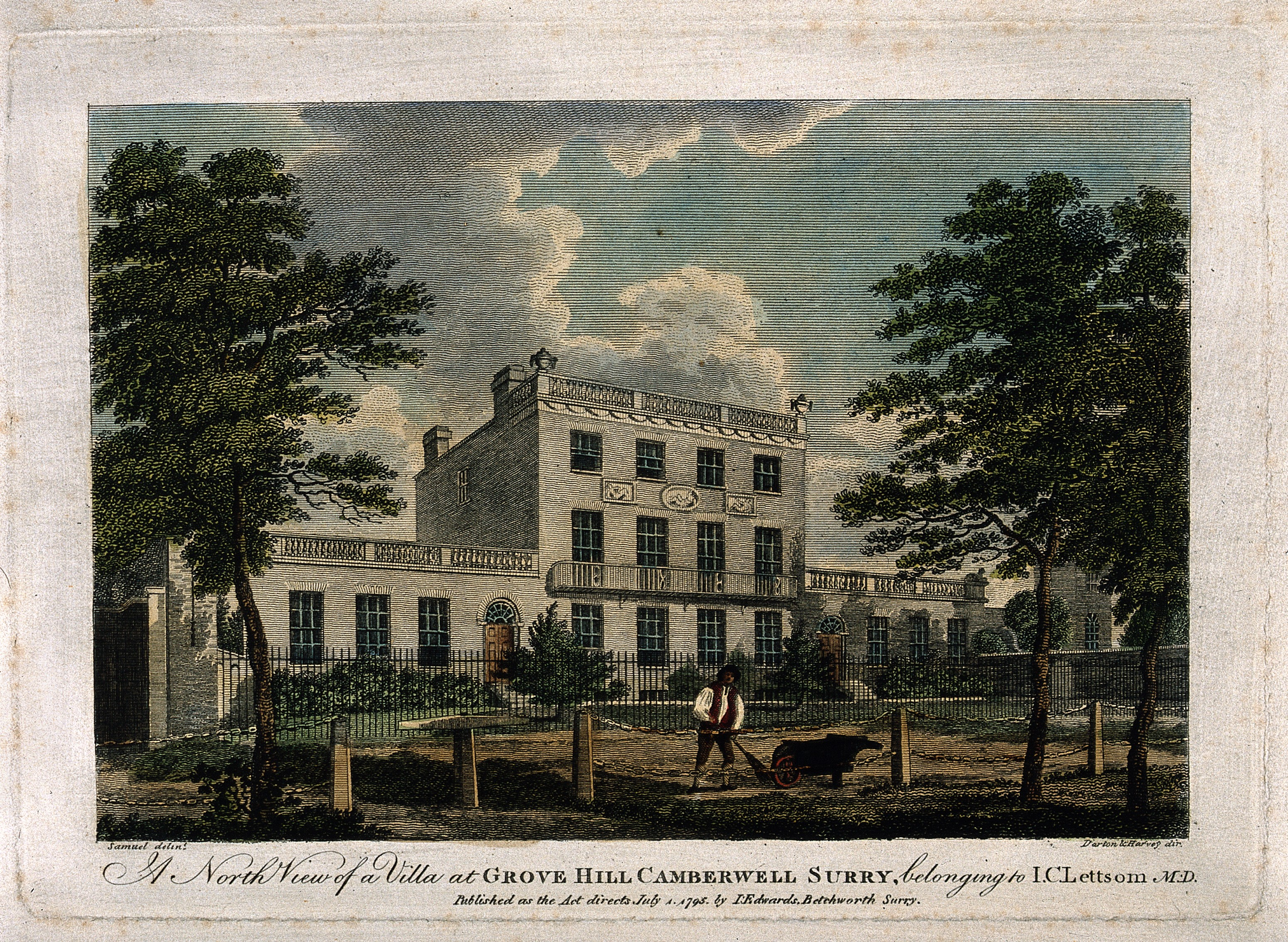
Grove Hill, engraving after George Samuel

== Notes ==
Attribution

This article incorporates text from a publication now in the public domain: Lee, Sidney, ed. (1897). "Samuel, George". Dictionary of National Biography. Vol. 50. London: Smith, Elder & Co.
