= Indian Trader (1791 ship) =

1791 British sailing ship

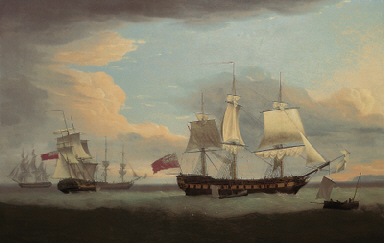
- The East Indiaman Hindostan in company with Indian Trader, Ewretta, and Nancy, ships employed in the Canada trade. Thomas Whitcombe, c. 1830

History

Great Britain
- Name: Indian Trader
- Owner: 1791:John Brickwood; 1798:M. Benson; 1823:J. Somes
- Builder: Barnard, Deptford
- Launched: 28 November 1791
- Fate: Wrecked and condemned 1829

General characteristics
- Tons burthen: 340, 34020/94 or 342, or 345, or 368 (bm)
- Length: Overall: 101 ft 8 in (31 m); Keel:80 ft 6 in (25 m)
- Beam: 28 ft 2 1/4 in (9 m)
- Depth of hold: 11 ft 5 1/2 in (3 m)
- Propulsion: Sail
- Complement: 1794:25; 1796:31; 1798:25; 1801:35
- Armament: 1794:8 × 6&4-pounder guns + 2 swivel guns; 1796:10 × 6&4-pounder guns; 1798:14 × 6&9-pounder guns; 1801:16 × 18&6-pounder guns; 1815:4 × 9-pounder guns + 4 × 12-pounder carronades
- Notes: Three decks

Indian Trader was launched in 1791. She made one voyage for the British East India Company (EIC). She was on her second voyage when a French privateer captured her. The British recaptured her and she returned to merchant service, sailing to the Americas. She was lost c. 1830.

== Career ==
Indian Trader entered Lloyd's Register in 1792, with John Edwards, master, Brickwood, owner, and trade London–Montreal.

Lloyd's Register for 1794 showed Indian Trader's master changing from Edwards to Dunlop, and her trade from London–Montreal to London–Bengal.

On 1 May 1794, Captain David Dunlop acquired a letter of marque. Before she was ready for a voyage for the EIC, Wells repaired her. On 25 June, Gilbert Ferguson and William Gillett certified to the EIC's Court of Directors that before she, and seven other vessels, had left the Thames, "everything was done, that in our opinion was necessary, to make them sufficiently strong to bring home a cargo from India".

Dunlop sailed from Portsmouth on 11 June, bound for Bengal. However, Indian Trader was detained there for over a month. She did not reach Falmouth until 14 August. She was at Madeira on 5 September, (Note: Before she left England, the Court of Directors had agreed with Indian Trader's ship's husband, William Hamilton, that she would be allowed to stop at Madeira.) and arrived at Calcutta 15 February 1795. Homeward bound, she was at Diamond Harbour on 14 April, and reached St Helena on 25 August. On 3 September she sailed from St Helena. She sailed together with Boddam, Rockingham, and Latona, and a number of other vessels, all under the escort of HMS Hector. Indian Trader arrived at the Downs on 24 November.

Captain Edmund Barker acquired a letter of marque on 5 May 1796. He sailed for Bengal on 15 May. However, in November the French captured her in the South Atlantic. Her captors sent her into Cayenne. The EIC had no cargo aboard.

In 1797, HMS Thetis recaptured Indian Trader as Indian Trader was sailing from Cayenne to Baltimore. Thetis sent her into Halifax, Nova Scotia.

Indian Trader returned to Lloyd's Register in the 1798 volume. Her master was Manlove, her owner was M. Benson, and her trade was Liverpool–Jamaica. Captain Joseph Manlove acquired a letter of marque on 18 June 1798. Lloyd's List reported on 18 July 1800, that Indian Trader, Manlove, master, had sailed from Jamaica for Liverpool, but had to return because of damage to her masts.

Captain James Corless acquired a letter of marque on 26 August 1801. D. Sheepe replaced him according to Lloyd's Register for 1803. (Note: Corless apparently had died. His will was proved in 1803.)

The data below is from the Register of Shipping.

Year	Master	Owner	Trade	Notes
1805	Skaife	Benson	Liverpool–Jamaica	
1810	Skaife	Benson	Liverpool–Jamaica	
1815	Lea	Benson	Liverpool–Jamaica	Large repair 1807

On 26 September 1815, Indian Trader, Lea, master, ran aground at Liverpool while returning from Jamaica. She was got off, reportedly without damage.

Year	Master	Owner	Trade	Notes
1820	Cameron	R. Hall & Co.	Liverpool–Montevideo	Damages repaired and good repair 1815
1823	P. White; Sinclair	W. Ewart; Somes	Liverpool–New Brunswick	Damages repaired and good repair 1815

On 6 July 1821, Indian Trader sailed from Belfast with 200 migrants. She arrived at Quebec on 21 August.

On 31 May 1823, Indian Trader was at Sierra Leone when a lightning strike destroyed her mainmast.

Year	Master	Owner	Trade	Notes
1825	Reynoldson; Johnson	Somes	London transport London–Quebec	Underwent a good repair in 1823 and a large repair in 1824

Lloyd's List reported on 21 December 1827, that Maria had damaged Indian Trader.

On 13 January 1828, a gale drove Jessie Lawson into Indian Trader. Jessie Lawson then ran aground and was wrecked in Mountbatten Bay. All on board survived. Jessie Lawson was on a voyage from London to Van Diemen's Land.

Year	Master	Owner	Trade	Notes
1830	Trist	Somes	London–Campechy	Damages repaired in 1828

== Fate ==
On 26 October 1829, a steamboat towed Indian Trader into Stockholm. Indian Trader had been sailing from "Laguna" to St Petersburg when she had struck on Gotland. It was expected that Indian Trader would be condemned.

The Register of Shipping for 1831 has the notation "LOST" by her name. Lloyd's Register continued to carry Indian Trader with stale data until 1833.
