= Hindostan (1796 Indiaman) =

Ship of the East India Company

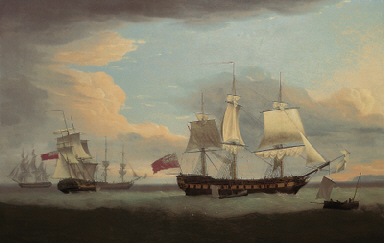
- The East Indiaman Hindostan in company with Indian Trader, Ewretta, and Nancy, ships employed in the Canada trade. Thomas Whitcombe, c.1793

History

Great Britain
- Name: Hindostan
- Owner: Robert Williams, M.P.
- Operator: British East India Company
- Builder: East India Company
- Launched: 1796
- Fate: Wrecked 11 January 1803

General characteristics
- Class & type: East Indiaman
- Tons burthen: 1248, or 1463, or 1518 (bm)
- Length: 176 ft 9 in (53.9 m) (overall); 143 ft 10 3/4 in (43.9 m) (keel)
- Beam: 43 ft 8 3/4 in (13.3 m)
- Depth of hold: 17 ft 6 in (5.3 m)
- Complement: 1st letter of marque:150]; 2nd letter of marque:100
- Armament: 30 × 12-pounder guns

Hindostan was an East Indiaman of the East India Company. She was a large vessel of 1,463 tons (bm), launched in 1796 to replace a previous Hindostan that the Royal Navy had bought and turned into a Fourth Rate ship of the line. Her owner was Robert Williams, M.P., who had been the owner of the previous Hindostan.

She made three complete voyages. She was lost on her fourth voyage, wrecking at Margate in January 1803.

== Voyages ==
As was typical for East Indiamen during wartime, Hindostan made her voyages under a letter of marque, which authorized her to capture enemy vessels should the opportunity arise.

=== First voyage (1797-1798) ===
For her first voyage Hindostan was under Captain William Mackintosh, who sailed her to Bombay and China. Before leaving, she had the misfortune to run over Thomas and Alice in Blackwell Reach on 21 January 1797, sinking the smaller ship. Hindostan left for the Far East on 18 March 1797, via Bombay, Cochin, and Malacca, before arriving at Whampoa on 8 January 1798. For the return voyage she crossed Second Bar on 3 March, reached St Helena on 5 August, and the Downs on 18 October, finally anchoring on 22 October 1798.

Mackintosh had made five earlier voyages for the East India Company, including three as captain of Indiamen. In 1792-94 he was captain of a different Hindostan when he took George Macartney on Britain's first embassy to China. Mackintosh's letter of marque was dated 7 February 1797.

=== Second voyage (1799-1800) ===
For her second voyage, Hindostan was under Captain George Millett. She sailed to China, leaving Portsmouth on 18 June 1799. On the way out she reached Penang on 28 October and Whampoa on 16 January 1800. On her return trip, she reached Anger on 3 May, St Helena on 15 July, and the Downs on 23 September.

Because her captain had changed, Hindostan required a new letter of marque; Millett's was dated 15 April 1799. It would remain valid for his subsequent voyages as well.

=== Third voyage (1801-1802) ===
For her third voyage Hindostan was again under Captain George Millet. This was his eighth voyage for the East India Company, and his fifth as a captain. She sailed to the Coast and China, leaving Portsmouth on 31 March 1801. She reached Madras on 26 July, Penang on 28 August, and Whampoa on 29 September. For her return trip she crossed Second Bar on 7 December. She reached St Helena on 12 April 1802 and the Downs on 10 June, before finally anchoring on 13 June.

== Fourth voyage and wreck (1803) ==
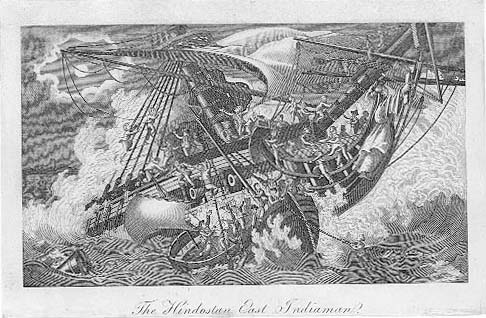
Wreck of the Hindostan in 1803

Hondostan's fourth voyage was for the Cape of Good Hope, Ceylon, the Coromandel Coast, and China. She carried mostly woolens and 45,000 ounces of silver bullion in 13 cases for private ventures, not the East India Company. For this voyage her captain was Edward Balston.

Hindostan left London just after the turn of the new year. Unfortunately a severe gale caught her just off Margate on 11 January 1803 and wrecked her on the Wedge Sand. She had about 120 persons aboard, of whom about 20 or 25 died. A more precise accounting states that 24 people died, including three midshipmen.

On the morning of the 12th, the Margate hoy Lord Nelson and the pilot sloop Liberty saved the rest. One account reported that 129 of the 143 people on board were saved.

The Court of Directors of the EIC presented the 16 crew members of Lord Nelson with 500 guineas for their "gallant and daring rescue of 105 men" from the wreck.

Eleven of the 13 cases of bullion were salvaged. Also 100 bales of wool were salvaged. The Company abandoned the wreck on 24 January. Hindostan's cargo was valued at £100,000. The EIC valued the cargo that it lost at £44,814.

The Whitstable museum has exhibits featuring items from Hindostan.
