= Casey Albert Wood =

Canadian-American ophthalmologist and ornithologist

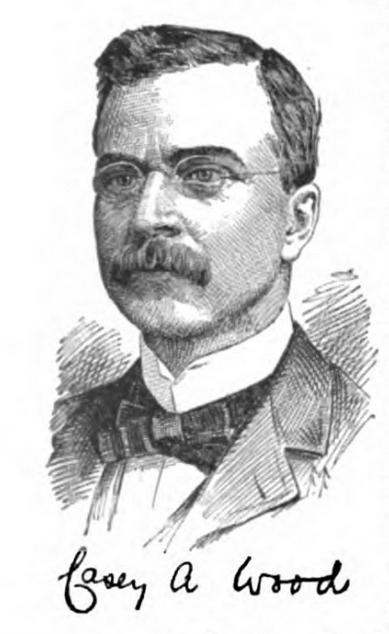
- Born: November 21, 1856; Wellington, Canada West
- Died: January 26, 1942 (aged 85); La Jolla, California
- Education: Ottawa Collegiate Institute; University Bishop's College
- Occupation(s): Ophthalmologist, zoologist
- Spouse: Emma Shearer (m. 1886)

Casey Albert Wood (November 21, 1856 – January 26, 1942) was a Canadian ophthalmologist and comparative zoologist who studied aspects of animal vision especially those of birds. He collected books on birds and zoology and helped establish the Blacker-Wood collection in zoology and ornithology at the McGill University Library.

== Early life ==
Wood was born in Wellington, Canada West to Orrin Cottier and Louisa (Leggo) Wood. His father was an eminent New York physician who traced his descent from Epenetus Wood who emigrated from Berkshire in 1717. Wood studied at Ottawa grammar school and spent a year at a French school in Grenville Quebec before assisting his father at his medicine practice. He graduated from the Ottawa Collegiate Institute, Ottawa, Ontario, Canada in 1874.

Wood married Emma Shearer in 1886.

== Post-secondary education ==
He obtained a master of surgery and doctor of medicine (MD CM) from the University Bishop's College in 1877 and a doctor of civil law in 1903. In 1905, the Bishop's Medical School was absorbed by the McGill University Faculty of Medicine and graduates were able to obtain ad eundem McGill MD CM degrees: Wood was awarded one in 1906.

== Medical career ==
Wood served as a clinical clerk under William Osler at the Montreal General Hospital while a medical student, beginning a life-long friendship which included their shared interest in book collecting. He practiced for a while in Montreal. By 1886, Casey Wood had decided to make Ophthalmology and Otology his specialty, beginning further studies in New York at the New York Eye and Ear Infirmary and then in Europe, at the University of Berlin, Moorfields Eye Hospital and Middlesex Hospital. In 1889, he settled in Chicago where he practiced, taught and published extensively. Wood worked as a professor of ophthalmology at the Chicago Post-Graduate Medical School and the Northwestern University.

== Great War ==
In 1917, he joined the United States Army and rose to the rank of lieutenant colonel during the First World War, serving with Colonel Fielding Garrison. He retired as a colonel.

== Post-War research ==
After the war, Wood studied the eyes of birds and reptiles in British Guyana and travelled later across the world including Kashmir and Sri Lanka. While in Sri Lanka, he commissioned G.M. Henry to produce a set of plates of the birds of the region. He published a work on The Fundus Oculi of Birds (1917). Based on ophthalmoscopic studies of living birds, he was able to identify discernible differences in the eyes of the paleognaths and other birds. He then lived in the Vatican where he studied foreign language works on ophthalmology producing a translation of Benvenutus Grassus on the eye. Among his other works is a bibliographic compilation on vertebrate zoology.

== Ornithology ==
In 1920, Wood gave up ophthalmology and began to concentrate on ornithology. Apart from his specialised work on the eyes of birds, Casey A. Wood also contributed in other fields of ornithology. He wrote about 'The Starling Family at Home and Abroad' in The Condor in 1924. In 1926 he contributed an article on 'Lessons in Aviculture from English Aviaries' to that journal. After his retirement, Wood and his wife, Emma (née Shearer) Wood, undertook several research expeditions including an expedition to the South Pacific.

He died in La Jolla, California on January 26, 1942.
