= Lord Hawkesbury (1787 EIC ship) =

Ship of the British East India Company

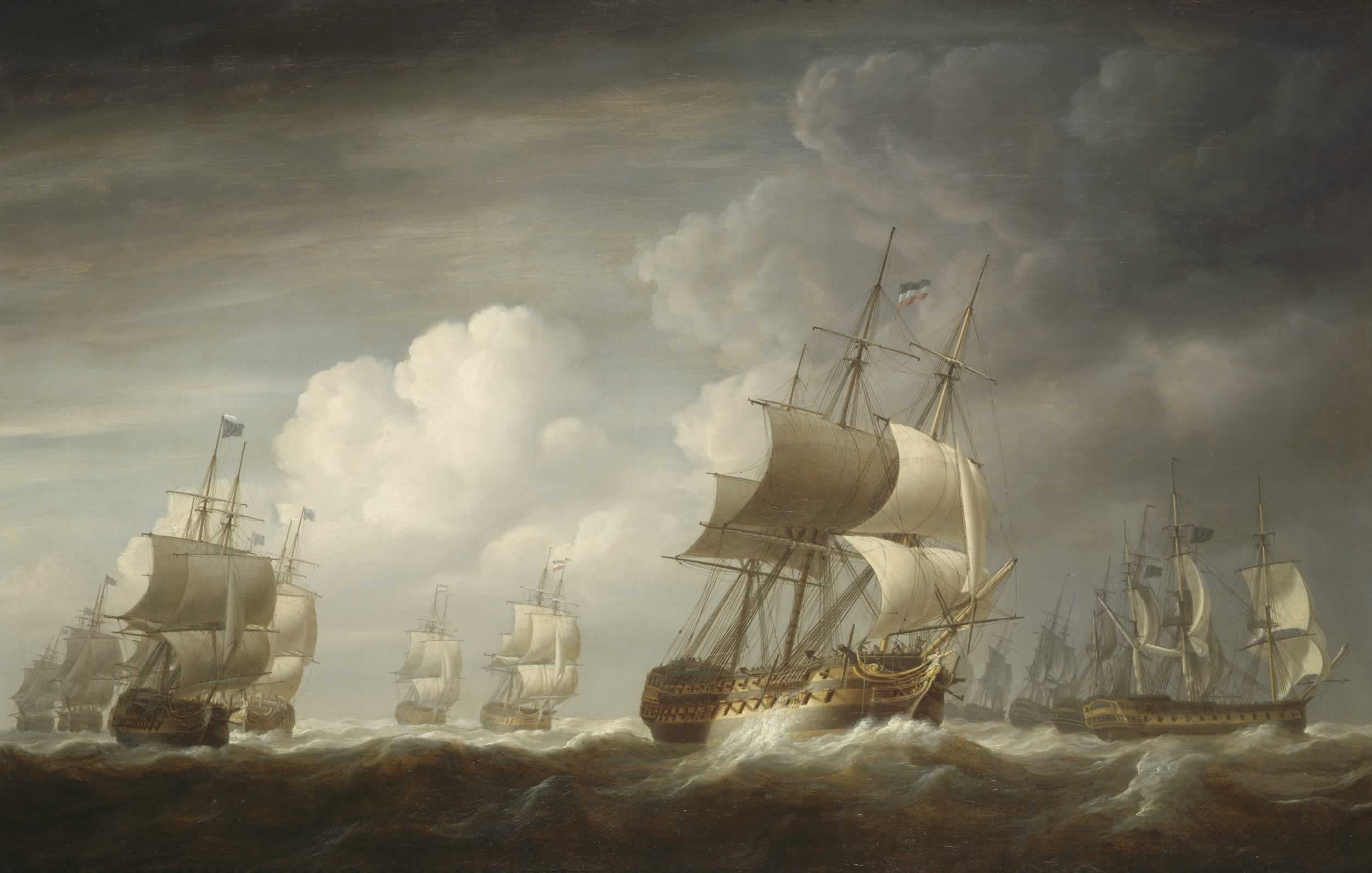
- A fleet of East Indiamen at Sea, by Nicholas Pocock; it is believed to show the Indiamen Lord Hawkesbury, Worcester, Boddam, Fort William, Airly Castle, Lord Duncan, Ocean, Henry Addington, Carnatic, Hope, and Windham returning from China in 1802

History
- Name: Lord Hawkesbury
- Namesake: Charles Jenkinson, 1st Earl of Liverpool
- Owner: EIC voyages 1-2:John Hodson Durand; EIC voyage 3:James Farquharson; EIC voyages 4-6:William Fraser; EIC voyages 7–8:Andrew Timbrell
- Builder: Randall & Brent, Rotherhithe
- Launched: 27 October 1787
- Fate: Sold for breaking up 1808

General characteristics
- Tons burthen: 803 or 80388/94 (bm)
- Length: Overall:143 ft 9 in (43.8 m) (overall); Keel:116 ft 1 in (35.4 m) (keel)
- Beam: 36 ft 1 in (11.0 m)
- Depth of hold: 14 ft 9 1/2 in (4.5 m)
- Propulsion: Sail
- Complement: 1793: 80; 1799:100; 1804:100; 1807:110
- Armament: 1793: 26 × 9&4-pounder guns; 1799:32 × 9&6-pounder guns; 1803:26 × 18,9,&6-pounder guns; 1808:26 × 9&6-pounder guns
- Notes: Three decks

Lord Hawkesbury was launched in 1787 as an East Indiaman for the British East India Company (EIC). She made eight voyages for the EIC before she was sold in 1808 for breaking up.

== Career ==
=== EIC voyage #1 (1788–1789) ===
Captain John Barkley sailed from The Downs on 7 January 1788, bound for St Helena, Bencoolen, and China. Lord Hawkesbury reached St Helena on 26 March, Bencoolen on 8 July, and Whampoa anchorage on 5 October. Homeward bound, she crossed the Second Bar on 27 December, reached St Helena on 29 April 1789, and arrived at The Downs on 9 July.

=== EIC voyage #2 (1791–1792) ===
Captain Barkley sailed from Plymouth on 29 March 1791, bound for St Helena, Bengal, and Bencoolen. Lord Hawkesbury reached St Helena on 21 June and arrived at Diamond Harbour on 4 October. Homeward bound she was at Kedgeree on 17 January 1792, reached Rat Island (Bencoolen) on 17 February and St Helena on 4 June, and arrived at The Downs on 10 August.

=== EIC voyage #3 (1794–1795) ===
War with France had broken out and Captain John Price acquired a letter of marque on 21 December 1793. Lord Hawkesbury was one of 39 Indiamen that the British government held back for a planned, and later canceled, attack on Mauritius. (The Government would pay £2,562 10s for 123 days' demurrage, including 22 days at Spithead.)

She finally sailed from Portsmouth on 2 May 1794, bound for Madras and Bengal. Lord Hawkesbury reached Madras on 11 September and arrived at Diamond Harbour on 15 October. Homeward bound, she was Saugor on 15 January 1795, was at Madras again on 3 March, reached St Helena on 24 May.

While Lord Hawkesbury was at St Helena, the 64-gun third rate HMS Sceptre arrived with the convoy of HEIC ships sailing to India and China. The assembled vessels at St Helena received word that a convoy of Dutch East Indiamen would pass by, sailing from the Cape back to Holland. Scepter, the Indiaman General Goddard, and some other Indiamen succeeded on 15 June in capturing eight Dutch vessels.

The entire convoy (Sceptre, the British Indiamen returning to England, including Lord Hawkesbury, and the prizes), now some 20 vessels or so strong, sailed from St Helena on 22 August for Shannon, where most arrived on 13 December, though three of the prizes were lost.

Lord Hawkesbury reached the Downs on 16 October. Unfortunately, her Chief Mate had been on one of the Dutch prizes that was lost.

EIC voyage #4 (1796–1798): Captain Price sailed from Portsmouth on 27 June 1796, bound for Madras and Bengal. Lord Hawkesbury reached the Cape of Good Hope on 19 September and Madras on 9 January 1797, and arrived at Kedgeree on 27 February and Diamond Harbour on 2 April.

The British government chartered Lord Hawkesbury, together with numerous other Indiamen and country ships, to serve as a transport in a planned attack on Manila. Lord Hawkesbury was at Saugor on 11 August and Penang on 26 August.

When the British Government cancelled the invasion following a peace treaty with Spain, it released the vessels it had engaged. Lord Hawkesbury was at Diamond Harbour again on 1 November.

She was at Saugor on 19 December, at Madras again on 11 January 1798, at the Cape on 23 April, and St Helena on 26 May. She arrived at The Downs on 2 August.

The EIC charged the British government some £4312 10s for demurrage for the 207 days delay to Lord Hawkesbury's original voyage.

=== EIC voyage #5 (1799–1800) ===
Captain William Donaldson acquired a letter of marque on 21 March 1799. He sailed from Portsmouth on 24 April 1799, bound for St Helena and Bengal. Lord Hawkesbury reached St Helena on 10 April and arrived at Kedgeree on 13 December. Homeward bound, she was Saugor on 9 Feb 1800, reached St Helena on 15 June, and arrived at The Downs on 23 September.

=== EIC voyage #6 (1801–1802) ===
Captain Donaldson sailed from Portsmouth on 31 March 1801, bound for Bombay. Lord Hawkesbury arrived at Bombay on 23 July. Homeward bound, she was at Tellicherry on 23 November, 5 Jan 1802 Quilon on 5 January 1802, and St Helena on 5 April. She arrived at The Downs on 8 June.

=== EIC voyage #7 (1804–1806) ===
Captain James Timbrell acquired a letter of marque on 16 June 1804. He sailed from Portsmouth on 10 July 1804, bound for Bengal and Madras. Lord Hawkesbury was at Madeira on 23 July and arrived at Kedgeree on 1 December. Homeward bound she was at Saugor on 31 January 1805 and at Madras on 12 February. She was at Ganjam on 13 April and returned to Madras on 1 May.

She left Madras on 8 September, together with Airly Castle, Duke of Montrose, Baring, and Devaynes, and under escort by HMS Weymouth, herself a former Indiaman.

Lord Hawkesbury reached Fernando de Noronha on 13 December, and arrived at The Downs on 23 February 1806.

=== EIC voyage #8 (1807–1808) ===
Captain Samuel Smith acquired a letter of marque on 27 January 1807. He sailed from Portsmouth on 18 April 1807, bound for St Helena and Bengal. Lord Hawkesbury reached St Helena on 13 July and arrived at Diamond Harbour on 28 November. Homeward bound, she was at Masulipatam on 1 February 1808, Madras on 16 February, and Colombo on 6 March. She reached St Helena on 11 June and arrived at the Downs on 14 August.

== Fate ==
In 1808 Lord Hawkesbury was sold for breaking up.
