= Airly Castle (1787 EIC ship) =

British East Indiaman 1787–1812

History

Great Britain
- Name: Airly Castle
- Namesake: Airlie Castle
- Owner: Robert Williams
- Builder: Barnard, Deptford
- Launched: 11 December 1787
- Fate: Traded for several years after 1810.

General characteristics
- Tons burthen: 799, or 813 (bm)
- Length: 143 ft 8 in (43.8 m) (overall); 116 ft 0 in (35.4 m) (keel)
- Beam: 36 ft 3 1/2 in (11.1 m)
- Depth of hold: 14 ft 11 in (4.5 m)
- Complement: 1793:99; 1807106:
- Armament: 1793:26 × 12&4-pounder guns; 1800:26 × 12&6-pounder guns; 1804:26 × 12&4-pounder guns; 1807:28 × 12&4–pounder guns + 6 swivel guns
- Notes: Three decks

Airly Castle (or Airlie Castle, or Airley Castle), was built by William Barnard at Deptford and launched in 1787. She made eight voyages as an East Indiaman for the British East India Company (EIC) between 1788 and 1808. In 1795 she participated in the capture of seven Dutch East Indiamen near St Helena. After her eight voyages she may have served briefly as a general transport before she was sold for breaking up in 1810. She was not broken up but instead served as a transport for several years.

== Career ==
=== EIC voyage #1 (1788-1789) ===
Captain Charles Stewart sailed from the Downs on 14 April 1788, bound for Bengal and Bencoolen. Airly Castle was at Madeira on 30 April and arrived at Diamond Harbour on 24 August. She sailed for Bencoolen, passing Culpee (an anchorage towards Calcutta, and just below Diamond Harbour), on 2 January 1789. She reached Madras on 13 January, and arrived at Bencoolen on 21 February. She was at Pring, a pepper port some 16 miles northwest of Manna Point, on the west coast of Sumatra Benkulen on 14 March. She returned to Bencoolen on 28 March and on 31 March was at Rat Island, a small island west of Bencoolen. Homeward bound, she reached St Helena on 26 June, and arrived at the Downs on 1 September.

=== EIC voyage #2 (1791-1793) ===
Captain Stewart sailed from the Downs on 10 May 1791, bound for Madras and China. Airly Castle reached Madras on 20 September, and arrived at Diamond Harbour on 5 November. On 19 January 1792 she was at Cox's Island. She was at Tellicherry on 4 March and Cannanore on 12 April. She arrived at Bombay on 10 May. She then sailed for China, reaching Malacca on 6 September and arriving at Whampoa Anchorage on 18 October. Homeward bound, she crossed the Second Bar on 11 December, and arrived at the Downs on 16 June 1793.

The EIC inspected the East Indiamen as they arrived and on 15 October fined Stewart and eight other captains £100 each for having not stowed their cargoes in conformance with the Company's orders. The money was to go to Poplar Hospital. (Note: There was a second announcement, on 30 July 1794 of a fine, but whether this was a restatement or a separate assessment is unclear.)

=== EIC voyage #3 (1794-1795) ===
War with France had commenced on 1 February 1793 and Captain John Gale acquired a letter of marque on 30 November. The British government held her at Portsmouth, together with a number of other Indiamen in anticipation of using them as transports for an attack on Île de France (Mauritius). It gave up the plan and released the vessels in May 1794. It paid £1,500 for having delayed her departure by 72 days.

Airly Castle sailed from Portsmouth on 2 May, bound for Madras and Bengal. Lloyd's List reported on 24 June that Marquis of Lorn, Livingston, master, had come into Lisbon in a much damaged state. She had been sailing from London to Gibraltar when she had run afoul of Airly Castle. (Note: Marquis of Lorn had been launched at Oban in 1790. At 145 tons (bm), she was less than one-fifth the size of Airly Castle.)

Airly Castle reached the Cape of Good Hope on 28 July, and arrived at Madras on 7 September. She then arrived at Diamond Harbour on 15 October. Homeward bound, she was at Saugor on 30 December, and Madras again on 3 March. She reached St Helena on 24 May. There she found General Goddard and a number of other Indiamen. Captain Gale died at St Helena and his first officer, Samuel Barnard, assumed command.

While the Indiamen were at St Helena, the 64-gun third rate HMS Sceptre, under the command of Captain William Essington, arrived with a convoy of EIC ships sailing to India and China. She brought the news that France had invaded the Netherlands in January. Furthermore, under an order dated 9 February 1795, Royal Navy vessels and British letters of marque were instructed to detain Dutch vessels and cargoes and bring them into British ports that they might be detained provisionally. Then on 2 June the packet ship Swallow arrived from the Cape of Good Hope with the news than a convoy of Dutch East Indiamen had left the Cape, sailing for the Netherlands. Essington had prevailed upon Colonel Robert Brooke, the governor of St Helena, to lend him some troops and to put the EIC vessels there at the time under his command to form a squadron to try and intercept the Dutch.

In the afternoon of 14 June, Essington's squadron sighted seven sail. The next morning General Goddard, Busbridge, and Asia, boarded the Dutch vessels. There were no casualties on either side. The British then brought their prizes into St Helena on 17 June. On 22 August the returning EIC ships and the prizes, a convoy of some 20 vessels, sailed for Shannon, where most arrived on 13 December. (Three of the Dutch prizes were lost.) Airly Castle arrived at Deptford on 27 October.

Although Airly Castle does not appear to have taken an active part in the capture of the Dutch vessels, she was part of the squadron. As a result, she did share in some of the prize money, as did Manship. Captain Barnard is given as Airly Castle's commander in the prize money notice, suggesting that Gale died before the capture of the Dutch vessels.

=== EIC voyage #4 (1796-1798) ===
Captain John Esplin sailed from Portsmouth on 27 June 1796, bound for Madras. Airly Castle reached the Cape on 19 September and arrived at Madras on 9 January 1797. Homeward bound, she was at Tellicherry on 12 April and the Cape on 12 July. She reached St Helena on 11 September, and arrived at Deptford on 2 January 1798.

=== EIC voyage #5 (1798-1799) ===
Capt Esplin sailed from Portsmouth on 29 April 1798, bound for China. Airly Castle was at Rio de Janeiro on 6 July. She reached 21 Nov Lintin Island on 21 November, and arrived at Whampoa on 27 November. Homeward bound, she was below the Second Bar on 25 January 1799 and at Malacca on 22 February. She reached St Helena on 17 May and arrived at Woolwich on 29 August.

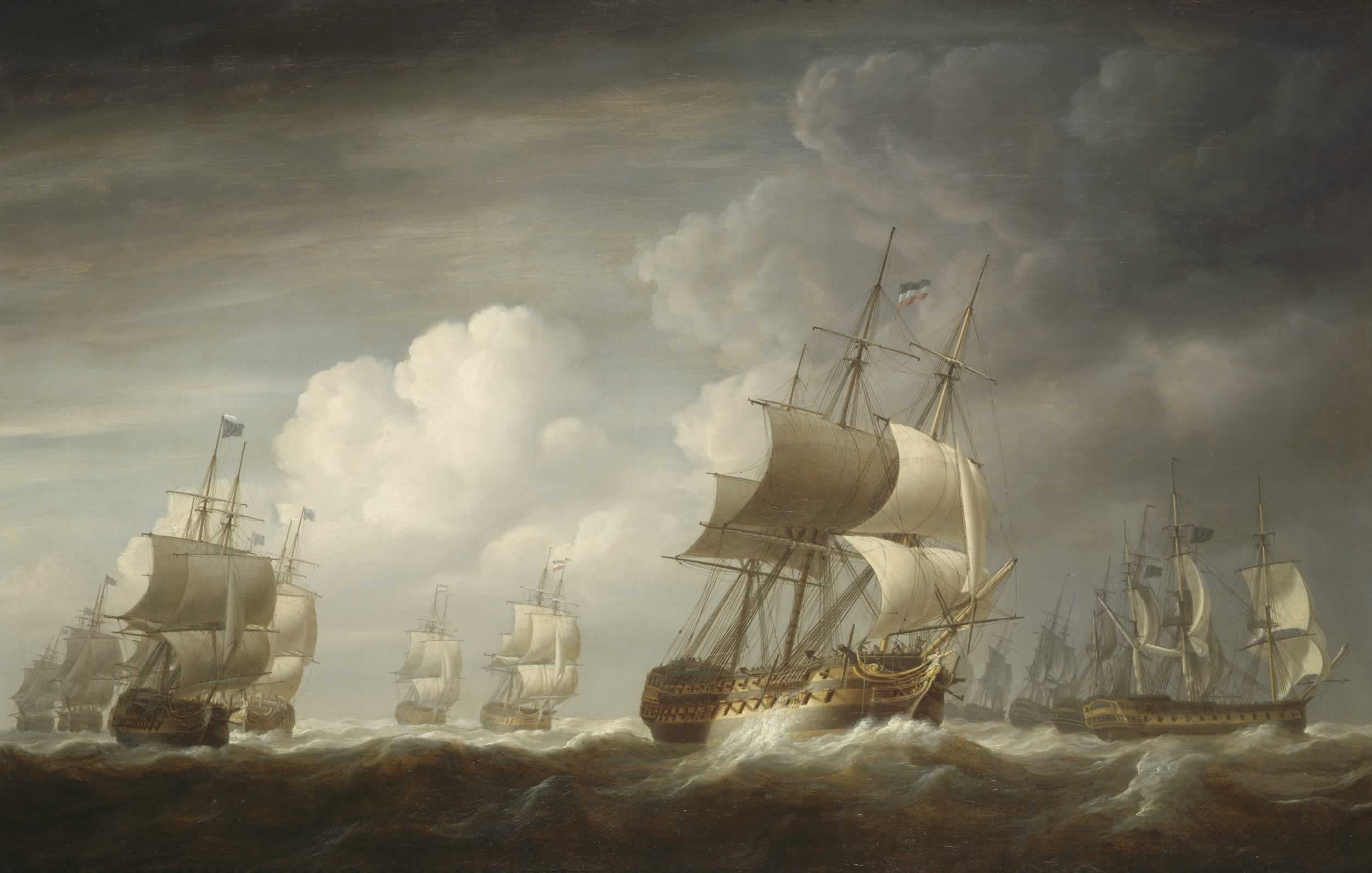
A fleet of East Indiamen at Sea, by Nicholas Pocock; it is believed to show the Indiamen Lord Hawkesbury, Worcester, Boddam, Fort William, Airly Castle, Lord Duncan, Ocean, Henry Addington, Carnatic, Hope, and Windham returning from China in 1802

=== EIC voyage #6 (1801-1802) ===
Captain Alexander Nash acquired a letter of marque on 18 December 1800. He sailed from Portsmouth on 31 March 1801, bound for Bombay. Airly Castle arrived at Bombay on 23 July. Lloyd's List reported on 30 March 1802 that she left Bombay on 15 November bound for Anjengo and Mahé. She was in company with several other Indiamen: Fort William, Worcester, Phoenix, Lord Hawkesbury, and Rockingham. However, Airly Castle sailed to Cochin, where she arrived on 31 December. From Cochin she sailed to Anjengo, arriving there on 3 January 1802, and Quilon, where she arrived on 5 January. Homeward bound, she was again at Anjengo on 21 January, reached St Helena on 3 April, and arrived at Deptford on 21 June.

=== EIC voyage #7 (1804-1806) ===
Captain John Mackintosh acquired a letter of marque on 8 June 1804. He sailed from Portsmouth on 10 July 1804, bound for Bengal and Madras. Airly Castle was at Madeira on 25 July and arrived at Kedgeree on 2 December. Homeward bound, she was at Saugor on 14 January 1805, and at Madras on 12 February. She detoured to Ganjam, which she visited on 14 March, before returning to Madras on 1 May. She left Madras on 8 September, together with Baring, Duke of Montrose, Lord Hawkesbury, and Devaynes, and under escort by HMS Weymouth, herself a former Indiaman.

Airly Castle reached St Helena on 3 December. Airly Castle was still there on 6 April. awaiting convoy. Airly Castle arrived at Deptford on 19 June 1806.

=== EIC voyage #8 (1807-1808) ===
Captain William Burgess acquired a letter of marque on 13 February 1807. He sailed from Portsmouth on 18 April, bound for St Helena, Bengal, and Madras. Airly Castle reached St Helena on 13 July, and arrived at Diamond Harbour on 27 November. Homeward bound, she was at Saugor on 14 January 1808, and Madras on 16 February. She reached St Helena on 12 June, and arrived at East India Dock on 12 October.

== Fate ==
In 1809 Airly Castle was taken up as a transport. The next year she was supposedly sold for breaking up. However, she continued to appear for several years as a transport, presumably for the Government, as she does not appear in Lloyd's Register or the Register of Shipping. Lloyd's List reported on 10 July 1812 that Airly Castle had arrived at Plymouth from Havana. Her ultimate fate is currently obscure.
