= Worcester (1785 EIC ship) =

History

Britain East India Company
- Name: Worcester
- Namesake: Worcester
- Owner: Henry Boulton
- Builder: Perry, Blackwall
- Launched: 3 December 1785
- Fate: Sold 1809 for breaking up

General characteristics
- Type: East Indiaman
- Tons burthen: 755, or 78970/94, or 798 (bm)
- Length: Overall:143 ft 5 in (43.7 m); Keel:116 ft 3 1/4 in (35.4 m)
- Beam: 35 ft 11 1/2 in (11.0 m)
- Depth of hold: 14 ft 9 1/2 in (4.5 m)
- Sail plan: Full-rigged ship
- Complement: 1793:99; 1801:100; 1804:105
- Armament: 1793:26 × 9&4-pounder guns; 1801:26 × 19&4-pounder guns; 1804::26 × 9&4-pounder guns
- Notes: Three decks

Worcester was launched in 1785 as an East Indiaman for the British East India Company (EIC). She made eight voyages to India and China for the EIC and participated as a transport in two naval expeditions before she was sold in 1809 for breaking up.

== Career ==
EIC voyage #1 (1786–1788): Captain John Hall sailed from the Downs on 20 February 1786, bound for Madras and China. Worcester reached Madras on 16 July and Malacca on 14 October. She arrived at Whampoa on 17 June 1787. Homeward bound, she crossed the Second Bar on 23 December, reached St Helena on 27 March 1788, and arrived back at the Downs on 26 June.

EIC voyage #2 (1790–1791): Captain Hall sailed from Portsmouth on 22 May 1790, bound for Bombay. Worcester reached Johanna on 25 August and arrived at Bombay on 20 September. She then sailed up and down India's west coast. She was at Tellicherry on 11 November and Cochin on 16 November, before returning to Tellicherry on 5 December. She was at Cannanore on 11 December and returned to Bombay on 7 January 1791. She left Bombay on 10 February and arrived at Goa on 13 February. Worcester was again at Tellicherry on 26 February and Cochin on 27 March. Homeward bound, she reached the Cape of Good Hope on 2 June and St Helena on 29 June. She arrived back at the Downs on 28 August.

EIC voyage #3 (1793–1794): War with France had broken out and Captain Hall acquired a letter of marque on 21 March 1793. He sailed from Portsmouth on 5 April, bound for Bencoolen. Worcester arrived at Bencoolen on 22 August. Homeward bound, she reached St Helena on 19 January 1794 and arrived at the Downs on 10 April.

On this voyage Worcester carried Mungo Park as her assistant surgeon. He would go on to achieve fame as an explorer of Africa.

EIC voyage #4 (1795–1797): Captain Hall sailed from Portsmouth on 17 May 1795, bound for the Cape of Good Hope, Bengal, and Bencoolen. Worcester was part of a convoy of Indiamen that were bringing General Alured Clarke and his troops for the invasion of the Cape Colony.

Worcester and the fleet arrived at All Saints Bay (St Salvadore) on 7 July.

Worcester sailed on 13 July, together with the other Indiamen, and under the escort of Sphinx. However, Sphynx ran into Warren Hastings and both vessels returned to port, Exeter accompanying them.

Worcester and the fleet reached Simon's Bay on 3–4 September. Worcester was at the Cape on 3 October. After her service at the Cape was over, Worcester resumed her voyage and reached Diamond Harbour on 2 January 1796. On 17 February she was at Saugor and on 4 April she was at Penang. She left Penang on 12 April but returned on 20 May. She left Penang on 15 June and arrived at Bencoolen on 22 August. Homeward bound, she reached St Helena on 13 October and arrived back at the Downs on 13 January 1797.

On 14 April Worcester stranded at Blackwall. She had been undergoing refitting at Perry's Dock and the stranding occurred as she was leaving. The stranding broke her back but she was successfully refloated and repaired.

EIC voyage #5 (1798–1800): Captain Hall sailed from Portsmouth on 17 February 1798, bound for St Helena, Bengal and Madras. Worcester reached St Helena on 2 May and arrived at Diamond Harbour on 27 August. She was at Saugor on 31 October and Colombo on 26 November. She returned to Bengal, reaching Kedgeree on 5 February 1799. She sailed from Kedgeree on 21 March and stopped at Madras on 12 April. Homeward bound, she reached St Helena on 26 October and Cork on 12 January 1800; she arrived at the Downs on 1 February.

EIC voyage #6 (1801–1802): Captain Searles Wood acquired a letter of marque on 3 February 1801. He sailed from Portsmouth on 31 March 1801, bound for Bombay, which Worcester arrived at on 23 July. She left on 14 November and reached Tellicherry on 23 November. On 5 January she was at Quilon. Homeward bound, she reached St Helena on 5 April and arrived at the Downs on 8 June.

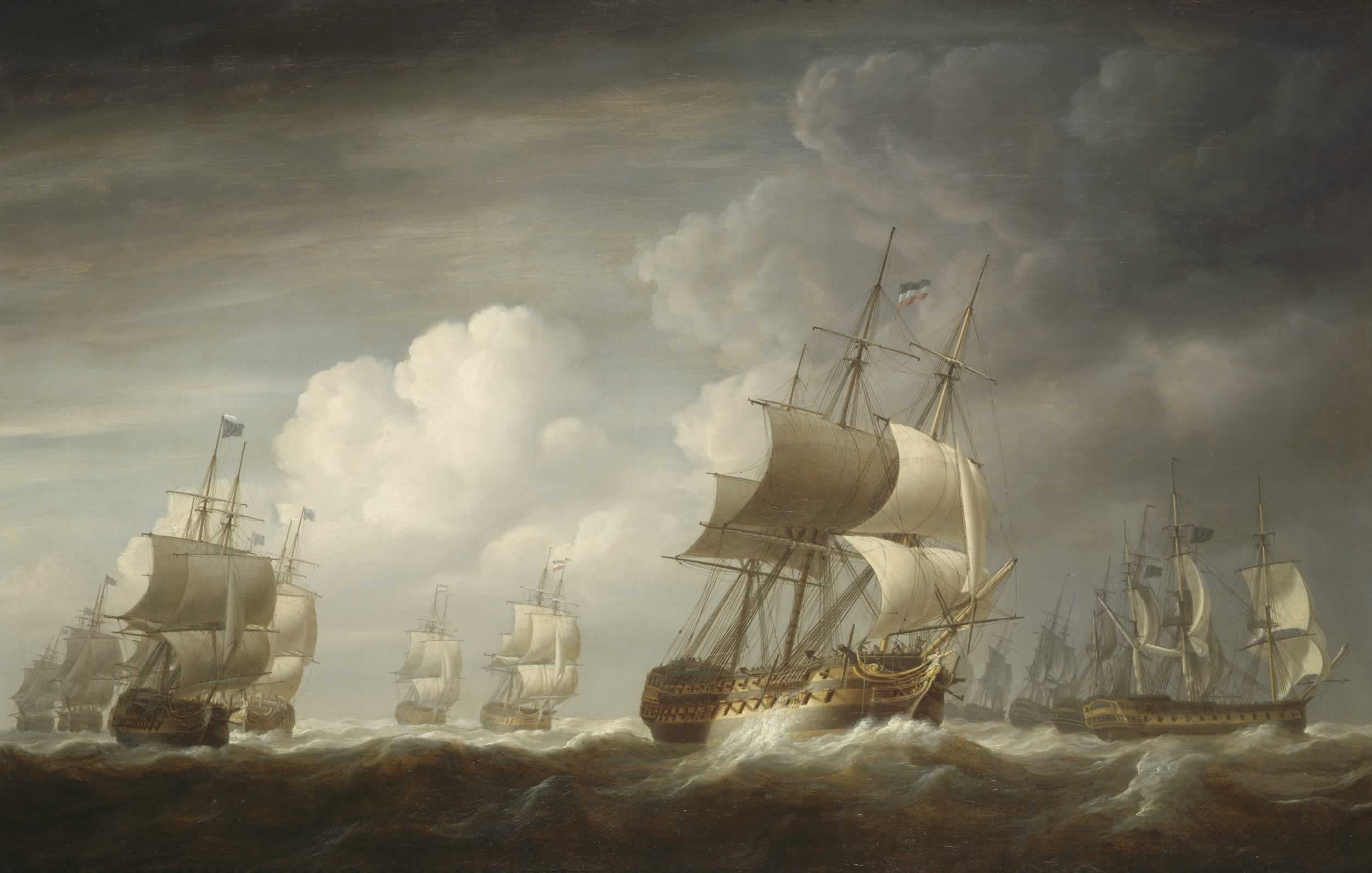
A fleet of East Indiamen at Sea, by Nicholas Pocock; it is believed to show the Indiamen Lord Hawkesbury, Worcester, Boddam, Fort William, Airly Castle, Lord Duncan, Ocean, Henry Addington, Carnatic, Hope, and Windham returning from China in 1802

On 15 September 1803 agreed with Henry Boulton to charter Worcester for two voyages at a rate of £15 per ton peace freight plus £17 per ton for war contingencies. The rate was based on a burthen of 793 tons.

EIC voyage #7 (1804–1806): Captain Wood acquired a new letter of marque on 7 June 1804. He sailed from Portsmouth on 10 July 1804, bound for Bengal, Madras, and Bombay. Worcester was at Madeira on 24 July and arrived at Kedgeree on 2 November. She was at Madras on 12 February 1805, Cannanore on 3 April, and Goa on 18 April. She arrived at Bombay on 27 April. Homeward bound, she reached St Helena on 30 August and arrived back at the Downs on 23 December.

EIC voyage #8 (1807–1808): Captain Woods sailed from Portsmouth on 4 March 1807, bound for St Helena, Madras, and Bombay. Worcester reached St Helena on 13 May and arrived at Madras on 20 September. From there she sailed to Malacca, which she reached on 12 November, and Gressee, where she arrived on 5 December.

Worcester was acting as a troop transport for Rear-Admiral Sir Edward Pellew's Raid on Griessie. She carried 500 men from the 30th Regiment of Foot under Lieutenant-Colonel Lockhart for any landing operations that might be required.

The British squadron sought to eliminate the Dutch in an effort to safeguard the trade route with China, which ran through the Straits of Malacca and were in range of Dutch raiders operating from the principal Javan port of Batavia. With the destruction of the Dutch forces in Griessie, the last of the Dutch naval forces in the Pacific were eliminated.

Worcester returned to Madras on 13 February 1808.

Worcester was at Point de Galle on 14 March. The homeward bound fleet of Indiamen left her behind. She had sustained damage and it was expected that she would sail to Bombay or Bengal for repairs.

Homeward bound, she reached the Cape on 19 September and St Helena on 19 October. She arrived back at the Downs on 13 December. She was at Margate Roads when a gale caused her to loose an anchor and cables.

== Fate ==
Worcester was sold in 1809 for breaking up.
