= Lord Hawkesbury (ship) =

At least two vessels have been named Lord Hawkesbury for Charles Jenkinson, 1st Earl of Liverpool:

- Lord Hawkesbury (1787 ship) was launched in America in 1781, probably under another name. She entered Lloyd's Register in 1787. She made six voyages as a whaler and was lost on the seventh after a squadron of French naval vessels had captured her.
- Lord Hawkesbury (1787 EIC ship) was an East Indiaman for the British East India Company (EIC). She made eight voyages for the EIC before she was sold in 1808 for breaking up.
