= Baring (1801 Indiaman) =

UK merchant ship and convict transport 1801–1820

History

United Kingdom
- Name: Baring
- Owner: EIC Voy. 1: Robert Charnock; EIC Voy. 2: John Rogers; EIC Voy. 3-6: George Fraser; Convict transport: Buckle & Co.
- Operator: 1801-1814: British East India Company (EIC)
- Builder: Barnard, Deptford
- Launched: 1801
- Fate: No longer listed after 1820

General characteristics
- Tons burthen: 820, or 819 41/94, or 842, or 878 (bm)
- Length: 146 ft 1 1/2 in (44.539 m) (overall); 118 ft 8 in (36.17 m) (keel)
- Beam: 36 ft 0 1/2 in (10.986 m)
- Depth of hold: 14 ft 9 in (4.50 m)
- Propulsion: Sail
- Complement: 100
- Armament: 1804: 32 × 18-pounder guns; 1807: 32 × 18-pounder guns + 4 × swivel guns

Baring was a three-decker East Indiaman that made six voyages to India for the British East India Company (EIC) between 1802 and 1814. Her owners then sold her and under new owners she made two voyages transporting convicts to Australia. Her last appearance in Lloyd's Register is in 1820.

== East Indiaman ==
=== Voyage 1 (1802-1803) ===
Captain Dixon Meadows left Portsmouth on 1 March 1802, bound for Madras and Bengal. Baring reached Madeira on 14 March and Madras on 5 July, and arrived at Diamond Harbour on 17 July. For her return voyage, she passed Saugor on 12 January 1803, reached Madras on 13 March, St Helena on 8 August, and Cork, Ireland, on 1 December. She arrived at Long Reach on 15 December.

=== Voyage 2 (1804-1806) ===
Dixon left Portsmouth Portsmouth on 10 July 1804, bound for Bengal and Madras. Because Baring was traveling during wartime, the Napoleonic Wars having started in 1803, Dixon arranged to sail under a letter of marque, dated 5 June 1804. The letter authorized him to engage in offensive action against the French, should the opportunity arise, and not just defensive action. On her return voyage she left Madras on 8 September, together with Airly Castle, Duke of Montrose, Lord Hawkesbury, and Devaynes, and under escort by HMS Weymouth, herself a former Indiaman. Baring reached St Helena on 21 March 1806, and arrived at the Downs on 14 June.

=== Voyage 3 (1807-1808 ===
Captain James Carnegie sailed from Portsmouth on 4 March 1807, bound for Madras and Bengal. A change of master meant the necessity of a new letter of marque. Carnegie's letter was dated 25 June 1807. Because Carnegie remained Baring's master until the end of the war, he did not require a reissue of a letter on his later voyages. Baring reached Madras on 5 July, and Saugor on 29 July. Homeward bound she reached Madras on 22 October, the Cape on 30 December, and St Helena on 25 January 1808. She arrived at Purfleet on 11 April.

=== Voyage 4 (1809-1810) ===
Carnegie left Portsmouth on 24 February 1809, bound for Madras and Bengal. Baring reached Madeira on 8 March, and Madras on 5 July, and arrived at Diamond Harbour on 19 July. Homeward bound, she passed Saugor on 17 October, reached Vizagapatam on 31 December, Madras on 13 January 1810, Colombo on 3 February, and St Helena on 3 May. She arrived at Long Reach on 8 July.

=== Voyage 5 (1811-1812) ===
Carnegie left Torbay on 12 May 1811, bound for Madras and Bengal. Baring reached Madras on 10 September, and arrived at Diamond Harbour on 15 October. Homeward bound, she passed Saugor on 6 December, reached 8 Jan Vizagapatam on 8 January 1812, Madras on 25 January, and St Helena on 11 May. She arrived at Gravesend on 25 July.

=== Voyage 6 (1813-1814) ===
Carnegie left Portsmouth on 29 January 1813, bound for Madras and Bengal. Baring reached Madeira on 19 February, the Cape on 8 May, and Madras on 5 July, arriving at Diamond Harbour on 13 August. On the return voyage she passed Saugor on 29 October, reached Point de Galle on 29 December, the Cape on 1 March 1814, and St Helena on 18 March. She arrived at Long Reach on 1 June.

== Convict transport ==
Her owners sold to J.W. Buckle & Co., London. Buckle & Co. proceeded to charter Baring out as a convict transport.

Also, in 1813, the EIC had lost its monopoly on the trade between India and Britain. British ships were then free to sail between England and India or the Indian Ocean under a licence from the EIC.

=== First convict voyage (1815) ===
Under the command of John Lamb, Baring left England on 20 April 1815, with 300 male convicts. A detachment from the 34th Regiment of Foot provided the guards. She sailed via Madeira, where she stopped on 9 May, sailing again the same day, and Rio de Janeiro, where she stopped on 9 June. She arrived at Port Jackson on 17 September. Two male convicts died on the voyage.

Baring left Port Jackson on 6 November, bound for Calcutta. In Australia Lamb was able to load a cargo of coal, which added to his income from the voyage. Baring arrived in Bengal (Calcutta) on 19 January 1816. Outward bound, she was at Saugor on 5 February. She sailed for London on 12 March. She arrived at the Cape on 1 June, and was expected to sail on 9 June. She sailed on the 10th, and arrived at Gravesend on 9 September.

On 18 February 1817, Baring, Lamb, master, sailed from Gravesend, bound for St Helena and India. She was at St Helena on 22 July, and Trincomalee on 5 October. She arrived at Bengal on 9 November. On 17 January 1818, she sailed from Bengal for Madras and London. On 31 May she sailed from Madras. On 5 May, she was at St Helena and on 11 May, she was off Ascension Island. She was off Falmouth on 7 July, and arrived back at Gravesend on 12 July.

=== Second convict voyage (1819-1820) ===
On her second convict voyage, Baring was still under the command of John Lamb. On 18 December 1818, she left Sheerness, bound for New South Wales. However, she ran on shore on the Brake Sand, but was soon got off again, apparently without damage. Still, it turned out that she had to return to the Thames to effect repairs.

Baring left the Downs on 27 January 1819. She sailed via Madeira and Hobart Town and arrived at Port Jackson on 26 June. She had embarked 300 male convicts, of whom five died on the voyage; she left five who were sick, one of whom died later, at Hobart Town. On this voyage too Lamb returned via Calcutta.

Baring left on 5 August, and sailed round New Guinea. She arrived in the Bay of Bengal on 9 October. On 18 April 1820, she left the Cape of Good Hope for London. On 25 June, she was off Dartmouth and on 29 or 30 June, she arrived at Deal. On 4 July, she arrived at Gravesend.

While sailing from Port Jackson to Bengal, Lamb and Baring spent three days in the Baring Shoals, a cluster of detached reefs and banks near Booby and Bellona Shoals and reefs in the Chesterfield Islands after leaving New South Wales. Baring Shoals includes an island at 21°24′30″S 158°20′0″E. During the three days Lamb took numerous soundings to determine depths.

== Fate ==
On his second return to London, in July 1820, Buckle & Co. appointed Lamb to command of their merchant ship Palmyra. John Lamb was the brother of James Thomas Lamb, who in 1817 sailed another Buckle vessel, Lord Eldon, which too transported convicts to New South Wales. Lloyd's Register for 1821, no longer had a listing for Baring. The Register of Shipping carried an entry for her with Lamb, master, and trade London—New South Wales to 1824.
