= Earl of Abergavenny (1796 ship) =

East Indiaman ship, wrecked 1805

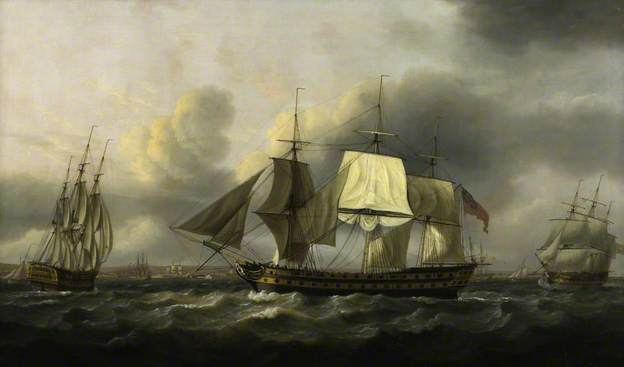
- The Earl of Abergavenny East Indiaman, off Southsea, 1801, by Thomas Luny

History

British East India Company
- Name: Earl of Abergavenny
- Namesake: Henry Nevill, 2nd Earl of Abergavenny
- Owner: William Dent
- Builder: Pitcher, Northfleet
- Launched: 15 December 1796
- Fate: Wrecked Weymouth Bay, 5 February 1805

General characteristics
- Tons burthen: 1,46017/94, or 1,498 (bm)
- Length: 176 ft 11 in (53.9 m) (overall), 143 ft 11 1/2 in (43.9 m) (keel)
- Beam: 43 ft 8 in (13.3 m)
- Depth of hold: 17 ft 6 in (5.3 m)
- Sail plan: Full-rigged ship
- Complement: Voyages #1-3: 110 men; Voyages #4 & 5:140 men
- Armament: 1st Letter of Marque: 32 × 12 & 9-pounder guns; 2nd Letter of Marque: 32 × 18 & 9 & 6-pounder guns; 3rd Letter of Marque: 32 × 18 & 12 & 9-pounder guns

Earl of Abergavenny was an East Indiaman launched in 1796 that was wrecked in Weymouth Bay, England in 1805. She was one of the largest East Indiamen ever built. John Wordsworth was her captain during her last two successful voyages to China. He was also her captain on her fifth voyage and lost his life when she wrecked. Earl of Abergavenny was built in Northfleet, Kent to carry cargo for the British East India Company (EIC). In 1804 she was one of the vessels at the Battle of Pulo Aura, though she did not participate in the action. She sank, with great loss of life, within days of leaving Portsmouth on the outward leg of her fifth voyage.

== Precautions ==
East Indiamen preferred to travel in convoys. Frequently, vessels of the British Royal Navy escorted these convoys, though generally not past India nor before on the return voyage. The Indiamen themselves were heavily armed so that they could dissuade pirates and even large privateers.

As with many East Indiamen during the French Revolutionary and Napoleonic Wars, Earl of Abergavenny sailed under letters of marque. These authorised her to take prizes should the opportunity arise.

== Voyages ==
=== Voyage #1 (1797–1798) ===
Earl of Abergavenny's first letter of marque was issued on 26 January 1797. Under the command of Captain John Wordsworth, Snr., (Note: He was the brother of English poet William Wordsworth.) she left Portsmouth on 18 March and reached Bombay on 5 July. By 17 November she was at Malacca and she arrived at Whampoa on 8 January 1798. On her return leg she crossed the "Second Bar" (the 'Second Bar' pagoda was a landmark and anchorage point on the Pearl River in Guangdong, China) 2 March and reached St Helena on 5 August. She arrived at the Downs on 18 October.

=== Voyage #2 (1799–1800) ===
Earl of Abergavenny, under the command of Captain John Wordsworth, Snr., left Portsmouth on 13 June 1799, reached Penang on 28 October, and Whampoa on 16 January 1800.

While she was at Canton, Wordsworth became involved in the "Providence Affair" when British sailors brought a wounded Chinese aboard her for medical care. A sentry on the schooner Providence, tender to HMS Madras, had fired on some men in a sampan attempting to cut Providence's cables, wounding one man. Eventually the Chinese authorities dropped the "Providence Affair".

On her return trip Earl of Abergavenny crossed the Second Bar on 28 March and reached St Helena on 15 July. She then entered the Downs on 23 September.

=== Voyage #3 (1801–1802) ===
Earl of Abergavenny's second letter of marque was issued on 5 March 1801. She then left Portsmouth on 19 May 1801 under the command of Captain John Wordsworth, Jnr. nephew to her previous captain. She reached Santa Cruz on 31 July, Penang on 31 October, Malacca on 24 November, and Whampoa on 30 January 1802. On her return she crossed the Second Bar on 11 March and reached St Helena on 10 July. She arrived in the Downs on 5 September.

=== Voyage #4 (1803–1804) ===
Earl of Abergavenny's third letter of marque was issued on 20 June 1803, after she had already left on her fourth voyage. When she left Britain, the Peace of Amiens was still in effect; war broke out on 18 May, almost two weeks after she left the Downs on 6 May 1803, again under the command of Captain John Wordsworth, Jnr.

She reached Whampoa on 8 September. For her return voyage she crossed the Second Bar on 13 November.

The battle of Pulo Aura was a minor naval engagement fought on 14 February 1804, in which a fleet of East Indiamen, including Earl of Abergavenny, intimidated, drove off, and chased a powerful French naval squadron, although the French squadron was much stronger than they. Commodore Nathaniel Dance's aggressive tactics persuaded Contre-Admiral Charles-Alexandre Durand Linois to retire after only a brief exchange of shot. Dance, in Warley, together with several of the other vessels, then chased the French warships until his convoy was out of danger. The British lost only one man killed. Earl of Abergavenny did not actually take part in the exchange of fire.

Earl of Abergavenny reached Malacca five days later, on 19 February 1804 and Penang on 1 March. She arrived at St Helena on 9 June and the Downs on 8 August.

== Voyage #5 (1805–wreck) ==
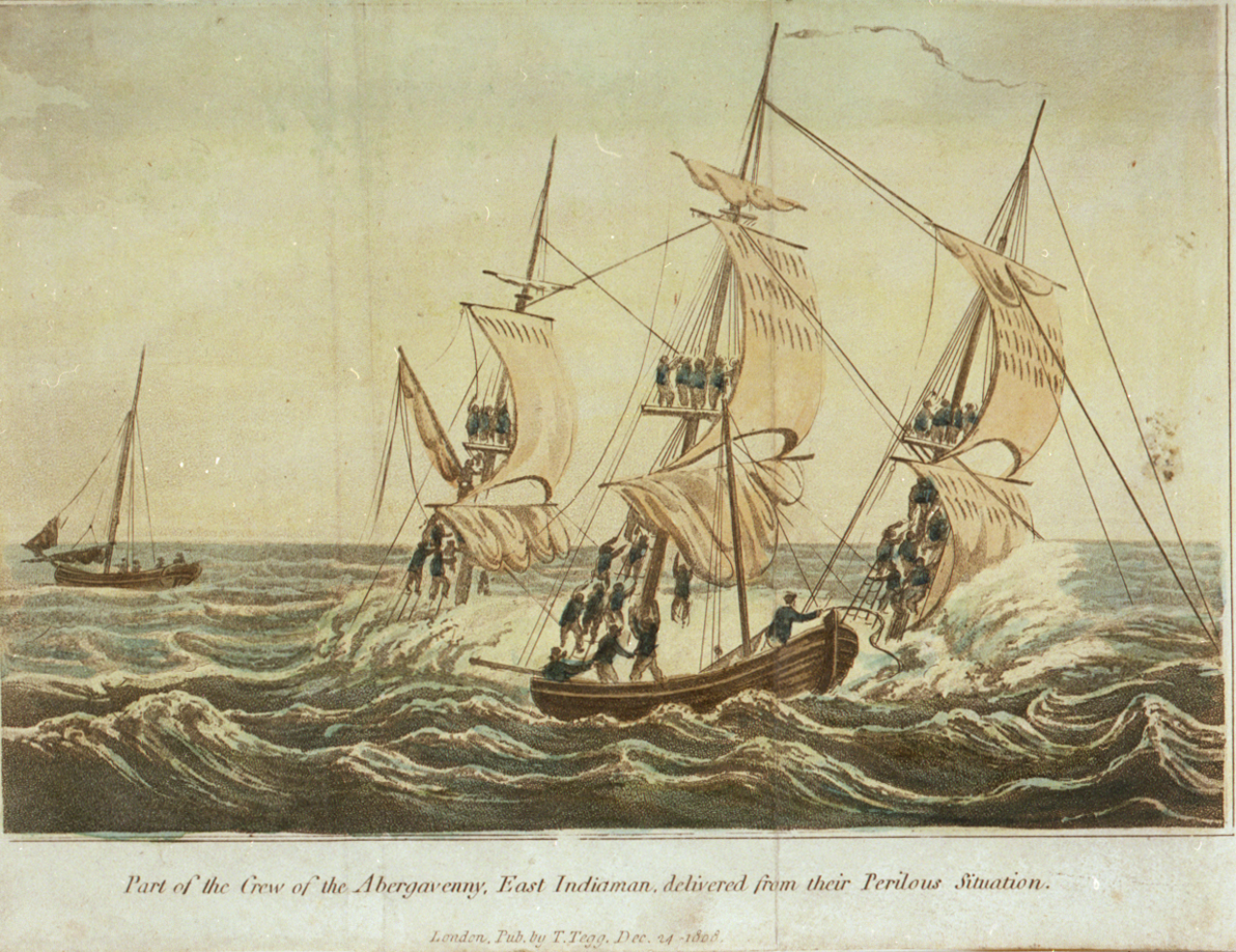
"Part of the Crew of the Abergavenny East Indiaman, delivered", Thomas Tegg, 1808, National Maritime Museum, Greenwich

Earl of Abergavanney left on her fifth voyage, this one to Bengal and China, under the command of Captain John Wordsworth Jnr (brother of William Wordsworth). She sailed with four other Indiamen and two whalers from Portsmouth on 1 February 1805. The four Indiamen were Royal George, Henry Addington, Wexford, and Bombay Castle. Captain William Stanley Clarke of Wexford was the senior EIC commander. Captain John Draper and HMS Weymouth, herself a former merchantman, provided the naval escort.

On 5 February Earl of Abergavenny struck on the Shambles off the Isle of Portland and then sank in Weymouth Bay with the loss of 263 lives, including Wordsworth, out of 402 people on board. Her complement for this voyage consisted of 160 officers and crew. She also carried 159 troops, from both the British Army and East India Company. Forty passengers were listed as being at the Captain's table, while 11 were listed as being at the Third Mate's table. In addition, there were 32 Chinese passengers.

Her loss was due to the pilot's incompetence. After she struck on the Shambles she was got off, but sank as Wordsworth attempted to sail her onto the beach. Wordsworth stayed at his post and went down with his ship. About 90 to 100 people survived the sinking.

The total value of Earl of Abergavenny's cargo was estimated to be £200,000. It consisted of porcelain and some £70,000 in specie. The EIC put the value of the cargo it had lost at £79,710.

Subsequent salvage attempts recovered the specie, which was in the form of 62 chests of dollars. By October 1807 almost all the valuable property had been recovered, including 30 pipes of wine. In September 1812 the wreck was blown up under water to prevent her forming a dangerous shoal.

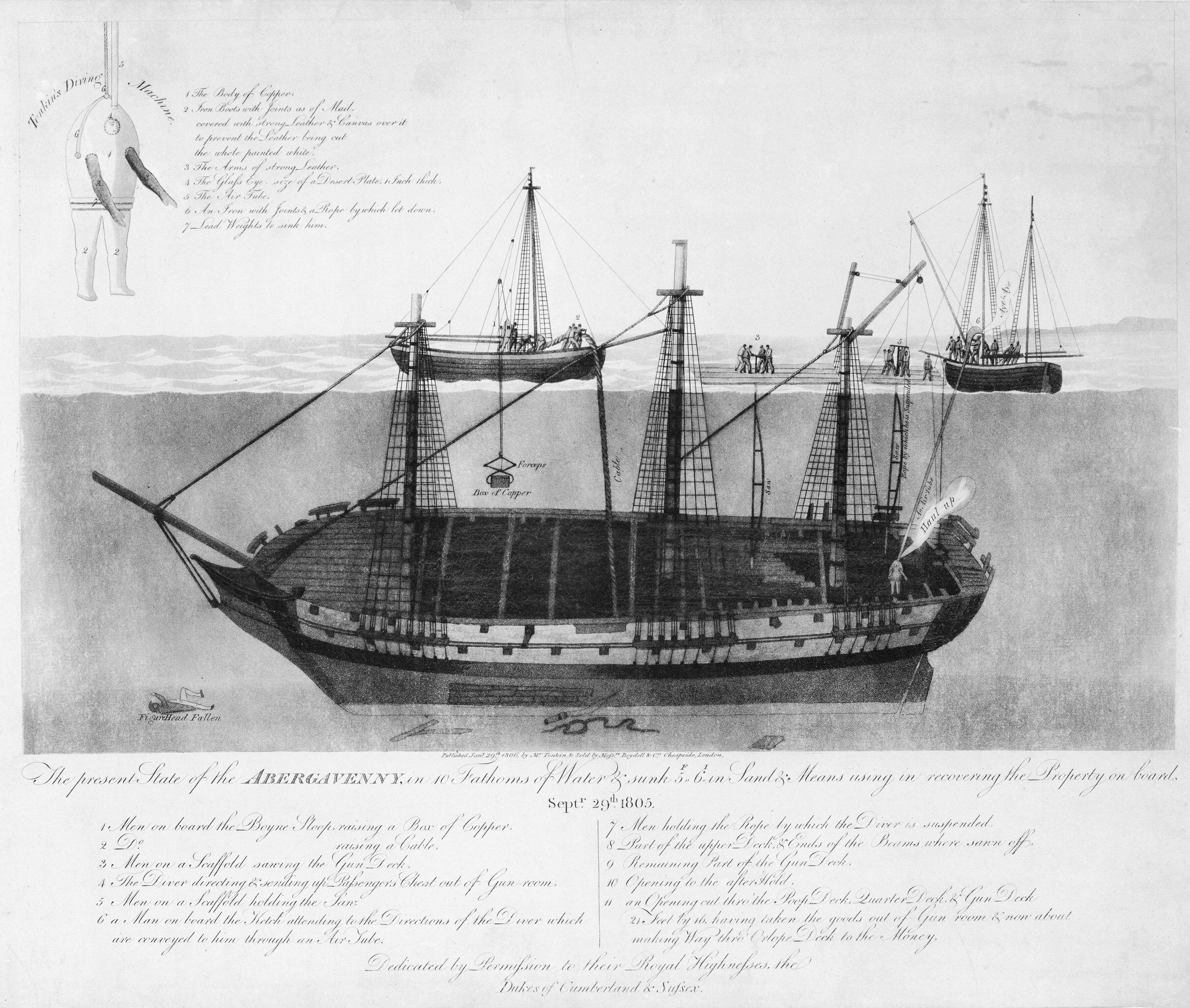
Salvage operations of the "Earl of Abergavenny"

== Archaeology ==
Earl of Abergavenny lies in 16 m (50 ft) of water and less than 3 km (1.9 mi) from the beach at Weymouth. There are several rows of wooden posts sticking out of the sand. Visibility is rarely more than 5 m (16 ft). The temperature ranges from 6 to 22 °C depending on the season.

In 2005 the Weymouth LUNAR Society received the Nautical Archaeology Society's Adopt-a-Wreck award for their underwater archaeology work in surveying, monitoring and interpreting this shipwreck.

The ship featured in the Channel 4 series Wreck Detectives.

In July 2022, an ingot of Cornish tin salvaged from the shipwreck was auctioned for £2,400.

In August 2024, the shipwreck was granted special protection by the Department for Culture Media and Sport on the advice of Historic England as a scheduled monument.

== See also ==
- Not to be confused with her namesake and predecessor, transferred to the Navy in 1795 as HMS Abergavenny
