= Earl of Abergavenny (ship) =

At least two ships, both East Indiamen of the East India Company (EIC), have borne the name Earl of Abergavenny, named for Henry Nevill, 2nd Earl of Abergavenny:

- Earl of Abergavenny (1789 EIC ship) - launched in 1789 and made two trips for the EIC before the Royal Navy bought her in 1795 and named her HMS Abergavenny; the Navy sold her in 1807.
- Earl of Abergavenny (1796 EIC ship) - launched in 1796 and wrecked in 1805.
