= Wexford (1802 EIC ship) =

British ship

History

East India Company
- Name: Wexford
- Owner: Sir Robert Wigram (principal managing owner)
- Builder: William Smith, Limehouse
- Launched: 11 November 1802
- Fate: Broken up 1816

General characteristics
- Type: East Indiaman
- Tons burthen: 1271, or 1344, or 134413/94 (bm)
- Length: 167 ft 0 in (50.9 m) (overall); 135 ft 3 in (41.2 m) (keel)
- Beam: 42 ft 0 1/2 in (12.8 m)
- Depth of hold: 17 ft 0 in (5.2 m)
- Complement: 1803:135; 1807:131; 1809:150
- Armament: 1803: 36 × 18-pounder guns; 1807: 36 × 18-pounder guns; 1809: 36 × 18-pounder guns
- Notes: Three decks

Wexford was launched in 1802, as an East Indiaman in the service of the British East India Company (EIC). She made seven voyages to India, Persia, and China for the EIC, on the first of which she participated in the battle of Pulo Aura. Her last voyage ended in 1817, and she was broken up c. 1819.

== Career ==
EIC voyage #1 (1803-1804): Captain John Henry Pelly was to command Wexford, but Captain William Stanley Clarke superseded him. Clarke acquired a letter of marque on 2 July 1803. He sailed from the Downs on 26 March 1803, bound for Madras and China. Wexford reached Madras on 4 August, and Penang on 7 September; she arrived at Whampoa Anchorage on 23 October. Homeward bound, she crossed the Second Bar on 1 February 1804.

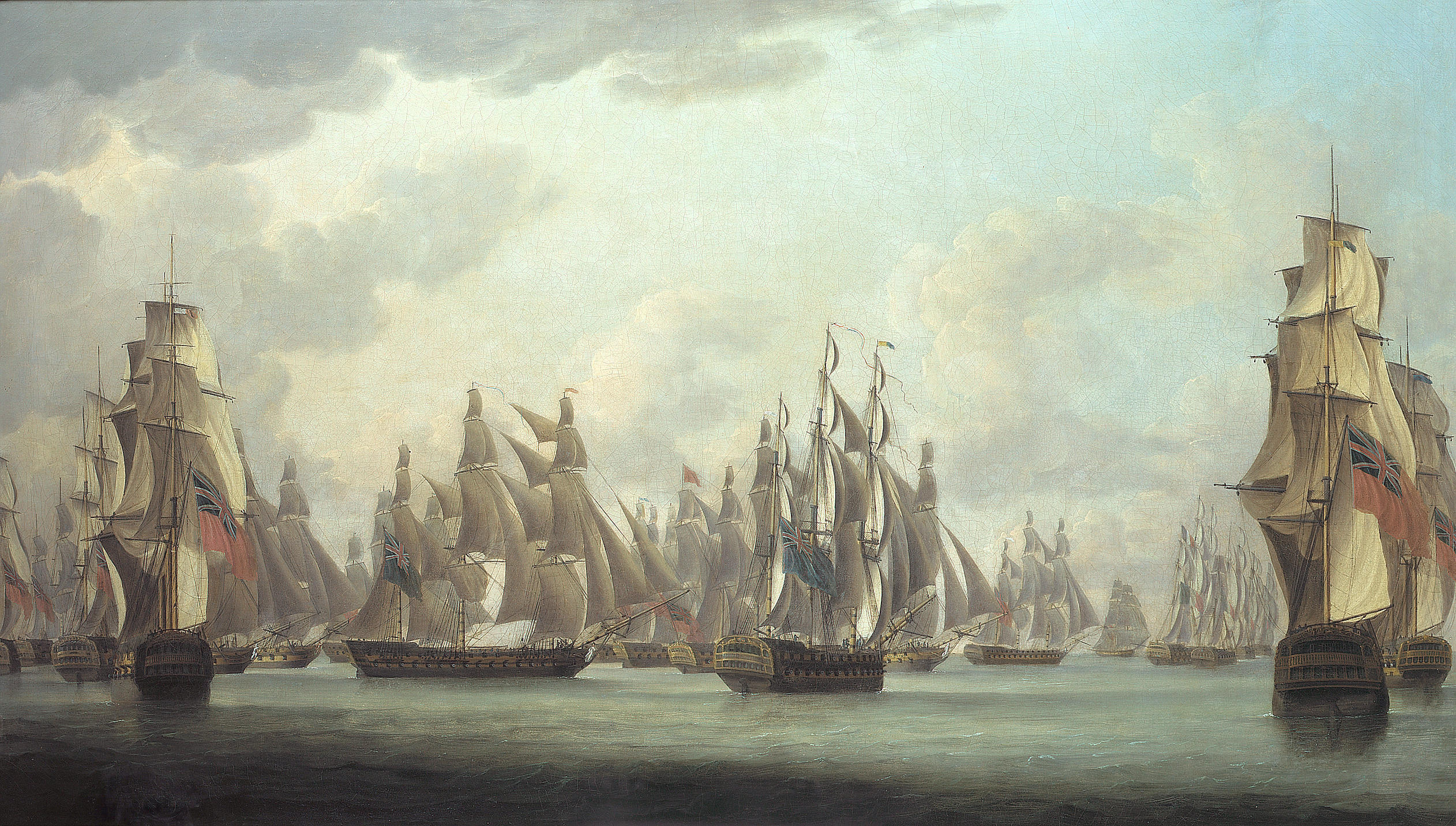
The Battle of Pulo Aura, which Wexford participated in

Wexford was among the Indiamen under the command of Nathaniel Dance, in Earl Camden. Dance was the senior commander of the East Indiamen that were sailing in convoy back from China. As they were passing through the Straits of Malacca, they encountered a French squadron under Counter-Admiral Charles-Alexandre Léon Durand Linois, who hoped to seize as many of them as he could.

Dance ordered his fleet to form a line of battle, while creating a bluff that four of his Indiamen were a squadron of ships of the line escorting the convoy. A skirmish ensued with the result that Linois, somewhat inexplicably, withdrew.

Wexford reached Malacca on 18 February, Penang on 1 March, and St Helena on 9 June. She arrived at the Downs on 8 August.

As the Indiamen that had participated in the Battle of Pulo Aura returned to London, they did so to great acclaim. The EIC presented the various commanders and their crews with a £50,000 prize fund to be divided among them, and the Lloyd's Patriotic Fund and other national and mercantile institutions made a series of awards of ceremonial swords, silver plate, and monetary gifts to individual officers. Lloyd's Patriotic Fund gave each captain a sword worth 50 pounds. Dance refused a baronetcy but was subsequently knighted.

EIC voyage #2 (1805-1806): Captain William Stanley Clarke sailed from Portsmouth on 1 February 1805, bound for Bombay and China. She sailed in a convoy with four other Indiamen and two whalers. The four Indiamen were Royal George, Henry Addington, Earl of Abergavenny, and Bombay Castle. Clarke, of Wexford was the senior EIC commander. Captain John Draper and HMS Weymouth, herself a former merchantman, provided the naval escort. Early in February Wexford ran foul of Pitt damaging her and forcing her to put back into Portsmouth to effect repairs.

On 5 February, the incompetence of her pilot caused Earl of Abergavenny to strike on the Shambles off the Isle of Portland; she then sank in Weymouth Bay with the loss of 263 lives.

Wexford reached Bombay on 20 June. At Bombay the EIC fitted out Wexford and Earl Camden to cruise in the Indian Ocean for the "protection of trade".

By 25 September, Wexford was on her way again, and in Penang. She reached Malacca on 10 October, and arrived at Whampoa on 28 December. Homeward bound, she crossed the Second Bar on 5 March 1806, reached Malacca on 18 March and St Helena on 2 July, and arrived at the Downs on 3 September.

EIC voyage #3 (1807-1809): Captain Charles Barnard acquired a letter of marque on 22 May 1807, and sailed from Portsmouth on 22 June, bound for Madras, Bombay, and Persia. Wexford reached the Cape of Good Hope on 15 September.

Wexford was in company with Warley, both requiring repairs, and HMS St Albans. They were carrying troops of the 47 Regiment of Foot, as were several transports, all for Madras. Warley, Wexford, and the transports, then sailed for Madras on 17 October, under convoy by HMS Greyhound.

Wexford and Warley reached Madras on 30 December. On 22 January 1808, Wexford and Warley were at Colombo. On 2 March, Wexford arrived at Bombay. At Bombay, on 3 May, she loaded a considerable amount of cotton for the government who were loading it on Wexford for the European market.

Then somewhat unusually, on 24 April, Wexford sailed from Bombay for the Persian Gulf. On 27 May, she was at Busher (Bushire) and on 15 August Muscat. (Note: The EIC had established a factory at Bushire in 1778, that was the head station for the EIC's trade in the Persian Gulf. The EIC had also appointed a resident at Muscat in 1808. (Possibly Wexford's visit to Muscat bore some connection to that event.) The EIC closed the Bushire Commercial Residency in May 1812.) Wexford returned to Bombay on 26 August. Homeward bound, she was at the Cape, on 9 December, reached St Helena on 24 February 1809, and arrived at the Downs on 23 May.

EIC voyage #4 (1809-1811): Captain William Stanley Clarke acquired a letter of mark on 7 December 1809. He sailed from Portsmouth on 21 January 1810, bound for Bombay and China. Wexfordwas at the Cape on 9 April, and reached Bombay on 26 May. She then was at Penang on 1 September and Malacca on 10 September, before arriving at Whampoa on 11 October. Homeward bound, she crossed the Second Bar on 12 February 1811, reached St Helena on 29 May, and arrived at the Downs on 8 August.

EIC voyage #5 (1812-1813): Captain Charles Barnard sailed from Portsmouth on 25 March 1812, bound for China. Wexford was at Batavia on 8 August, and arrived at Whampoa on 19 September. Homeward bound, she crossed the Second Bar on 3 January 1813, reached St Helena on 27 March, and arrived at the Downs on 5 June.

EIC voyage #6 (1814-1815): Captain Barnard sailed from Portsmouth on 9 April 1814, bound for China. Wexford arrived at Whampoa on 7 September. She crossed the Second Bar on 21 November, but returned to Whampoa on 26 November. Homeward bound, she crossed the Second Bar on 22 January 1815, reached St Helena on 19 April, and arrived at the Downs on 23 June.

EIC voyage #7 (1816-1817): Madras and China. Captain Barnard sailed from the Downs on 26 February 1816, bound for Madras and China. A few days later, on 10 or 11 March, Wexford put in at Ile de Rhé. She had encountered a severe thunderstorm that had sprung her main topmast and carried away her foretopmast.

She left on 16 April, after repairing, and arrived at Madras on 1 August. She was at Penang on 15 September, and Malacca on 15 October. She arrived at Whampoa on 3 February 1817. Homeward bound, she crossed the Second Bar on 29 March, reached St Helena on 6 July, and arrived at the Downs on 26 August.

== Fate ==
Wexford's registration was cancelled on 16 March 1819 due to the completion of her demolition.
