= Earl Camden (1802 EIC ship) =

UK merchant ship trading to Asia 1802–1810

History

United Kingdom
- Name: Earl Camden
- Owner: John Pascall Larkins
- Operator: British East India Company
- Builder: Pitcher, Northfleet
- Launched: 27 October 1802
- Fate: Destroyed by fire 23 July 1810

General characteristics
- Type: East Indiaman
- Tons burthen: 1200 (nominal rating), or 1271, or 127137/94 or 1295, (bm)
- Length: 166 ft 0 in (50.6 m) (overall); 134 ft 2 in (40.9 m) (keel)
- Beam: 42 ft 2 1/2 in (12.9 m)
- Depth of hold: 17 ft 0 in (5.2 m)
- Complement: 1803:130; 1805:140
- Armament: 1803: 36 × 18-pounder guns; 1805: 40 × 18- & 12-pounder guns
- Notes: Three decks

Earl Camden (or Earl of Camden) Was launched in 1802 as an East Indiaman for the British East India Company (EIC). She made three voyages for the EIC until a fire destroyed her at Bombay in 1810 on her fourth voyage. On her first voyage she was under the command of Nathaniel Dance, who was the commodore of the EIC's homeward-bound China Fleet at the Battle of Pulo Aura. In the South China Sea he led the whole convoy into an attack that bluffed a squadron of five French warships into withdrawing.

== Career ==
=== 1803–1804: First voyage ===
Captain Nathaniel Dance acquired a letter of marque on 19 August 1803. He sailed from Torbay on 4 January 1803, bound for Bombay and China. Earl Camden reached Bombay on 17 May and Malacca on 28 August, and arrived at Whampoa Anchorage on 2 October.

The British Royal Navy was unable to provide an escort and the captains of the EIC's China Fleet debated about setting out for home. Eventually the captains took the decision to take the risk. Dance, as the most senior EIC captain among them, became the commodore. Earl Camden crossed the Second Bar on 4 December.

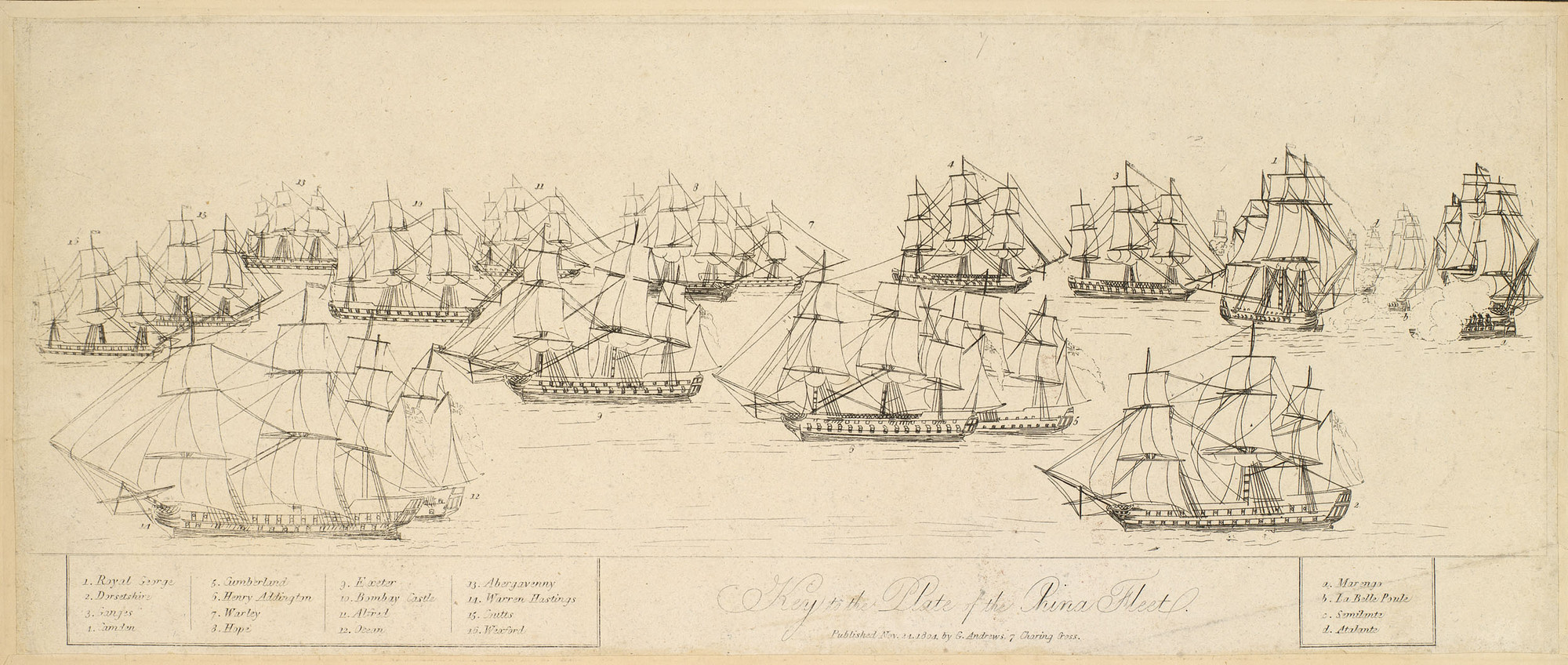
Camden can be seen in this printed key for a view of the Battle, showing the China Fleet a painting by Francis Sartorius, the younger after a drawing by an officer on board the Henry Addington

On 14 February 1804 at Pulo Aura, the China Fleet intimidated, drove off, and chased a powerful French naval squadron of five warships. Dance had Earl Camden and Royal George fly the pennants of Rear-Admirals, deceiving the French into thinking that they were facing a superior force of British warships escorting the convoy.

Dance's aggressive tactics persuaded Contre-Admiral Charles-Alexandre Léon Durand Linois to retire after only a brief exchange of fire. (Earl Camden herself engaged for 25 minutes, albeit at long range.)

Dance then chased the French warships until his convoy was out of danger, whereupon the fleet resumed its passage. Earl Camden reached Malacca on 18 February. On 28 February the British ships of the line HMS Sceptre and Albion joined the Fleet in the Strait and conducted them safely to Saint Helena in the South Atlantic. Earl Camden arrived there on 9 June. HMS Plantagenet escorted the convoy from St Helena to England. Earl Camden arrived at the Downs on 8 August.

Dance and his fellow captains returned to England to great acclaim. The EIC donated a £50,000 prize fund to be divided among the various commanders and their crews. National and mercantile institutions made a series of awards of ceremonial swords, silver plate, and monetary gifts to individual officers. Lloyd's Patriotic Fund gave a presentation sword worth £100 to Dance; it also gave each captain a sword worth £50, and one to Royal Navy Lieutenant Robert Merrick Fowler, travelling as a passenger on Earl Camden. King George III made Dance a Knight Bachelor. The Bombay Insurance Company personally presented Dance with £5,000 and the EIC awarded him an additional £500 a year for life. Dance immediately retired, having spent some 45 years in EIC service; he lived another 23 years.

=== 1805–1806: Second voyage ===
Captain Henry Morse Samson acquired a letter of marque on 26 January 1805. Morse sailed from Portsmouth on 25 April, bound for Bombay. Earl Camden reached Bombay on 11 August. At Bombay the EIC fitted out Earl Camden and Wexford to cruise in the Indian Ocean for the "protection of trade". Earl Camden was at Penang on 24 September and Colombo on 19 December. She returned to Bombay on 17 January 1806. Homeward bound, Earl Camden was at Tellicherry on 19 February and Anjengo on 8 March. She reached Saint Helena on 14 May, and arrived at the Downs on 18 July.

=== 1807–1808: Third voyage ===
Earl Camden was driven ashore at Northfleet on 17 February 1807. She was later refloated.

Samson sailed from Portsmouth on 18 April, bound for China. Earl Camden reached Penang on 14 September and arrived at Whampoa on 30 December. Homeward bound, she crossed the Second Bar on 11 February 1808, reached Penang on 5 April and St Helena on 10 July, and arrived at the Downs on 11 September.

=== 1808–1810: Final voyage ===
Samson sailed from Portsmouth on 21 January 1810, bound for Bombay and China.

== Fate ==
A fire on 23 July 1810 destroyed Earl Camden in Bombay harbour. Earl Camden had that day just loaded the last 50 bales of 6000 bales of cotton. Although arson by the lascars was suspected, the fire apparently was a case of spontaneous combustion. It spread throughout the vessel between midnight and 1a.m. The crew was unable to put it out, but all were able to get into her boats so there were no deaths. Earl Camden, burning furiously, drifted 10 to 15 miles till she grounded on the Mahratta shore. Fortunately no other vessels caught fire. Spectators who came out to see the spectacle risked their lives as her guns, which were loaded, cooked off. She burnt to the waterline, which fell as she rose in the water as the fire consumed her masts, interior, and cargo.

The EIC put the value of the cargo it had lost at £34,002.
