= Stentor (1814 ship) =

British transport and cargo ship

History

United Kingdom
- Name: Stentor
- Namesake: Stentor
- Builder: James Crone, Monkwearmouth, Sunderland
- Launched: 5 August 1814
- Fate: Wrecked 23 November 1846

General characteristics
- Tons burthen: 38243/94, or 383 (bm)

Stentor was a British transport and merchant vessel launched in 1814 at Sunderland. In 1820 she transported settlers to South Africa. She made several journeys to India under a license from the British East India Company (EIC). As a transport she carried troops and supplies to such destinations as Sierra Leone, Fernando Po, Ceylon, and the West Indies. She was wrecked in November 1846.

== Career ==
Stentor appeared in Lloyd's Register (LR) in 1815 with J.Hodgson, master, changing to G.Surr, Bevorn & Co., owners, and trade London, changing to Liverpool–Boston.

In 1813 the EIC had lost its monopoly on the trade between India and Britain. British ships were then free to sail to India or the Indian Ocean under a license from the EIC.

On 16 June 1816 Stentor, Harris, master, sailed for Bombay under a license from the EIC.

Year	Master	Owner	Trade	Source & notes
1818	Harrison	Taylor & Co. Beavir & Co.	Liverpool–India	LR; damages repaired 1816
1820	Harris	Beavin & Co.	Liverpool–Calcutta; London–Cape of Good Hope (CGH; the Cape)	LR; damages repaired 1818
1821	T.Harris	Beavin & Co.	London–CGH; London–Baltimore	LR; damages repaired 1818

In 1820, Stentor served as a transport vessel under the British government's 1820 Settlers scheme. Stentor, Harris, master, sailed from Liverpool on 13 January 1820 with 194 settlers. She reached Table Bay on 19 April. At Simon's Bay Stentor's immigrants had to transfer to Weymouth to finish their journey. Weymouth arrived at Algoa Bay on 15 May.

On 2 November 1821 Stentor, of and from London and bound for Baltimore, was at 34°35′N 73°51′W, having lost her foremast and bowsprit.

Year	Master	Owner	Trade	Source
1822	T.Harris	J.Taylor	London–Baltimore	LR; damages repaired 1821
1824	T.Harris	J.Taylor	London–Bengal; London–Quebec	LR; damages repaired 1821

On 3 October 1823 Stentor, Harris, master, ran aground on the Long Sand near Saugor Point while sailing from Bengal back to London. She was got off and put into Diamond Harbour. It was expected that she would return to Calcutta to go into dock.

Year	Master	Owner	Trade	Source
1826	A.Wade	J.Somes	Cork [transport]	LR; damages repaired 1821
1827	Marshall; Wade	T.Somes	London Transport	LR; damages repaired 1821

On 8 October 1826, the Stentor Transport, Marshall, master, put into Portsmouth. She had been sailing from London to Africa and had reached Longitude 16°, but on 29 September experienced heavy gale. She had lost sails and bulwarks, had had to throw her guns and spars overboard, and had become leaky.

Lloyd's List reported on 6 March 1827 that on the 2nd the Stentor Transport had run into the Champion Transport at Portsmouth and had done considerable damage to Champion.

Year	Master	Owner	Trade	Source & notes
1830	T.Birkitt	J.Somes	Cork-based transport	LR; small repairs 1830
1835				Not listed
1836		J.Somes	London	LR; large repair 1835
1840	A.Smith	Hull Shipping Co.	Hull–Africa	LR; large repair 1835, small repair 1838, & damage repair and small repair 1840
1845	Wright	W.Wright	Hull–Quebec	LR; large repair 1835 & damage repair and small repairs 1840

In 1831 Stentor transported supplies to Fernando Po where the Royal Navy wished to establish a naval depot where the ships of the West Africa Squadron might refit and re-provision. While she was there her master and a boy died of disease. (The West Africa, or Preventative Squadron, was employed in suppressing the Trans-Atlantic slave trade.)

== Fate ==
Stentor was driven ashore and wrecked on 23 November 1846 in the Gut of Canso. She was on a voyage from Hull to Miramichi, New Brunswick.

Lloyd's Register for 1846 showed Stentor with Wright, master, M.Wright, owner, and trade Hull–Quebec. The entry carried the annotation "Abandoned".
