= Duke of Montrose (1785 EIC ship) =

History

Great Britain
- Name: Duke of Montrose
- Namesake: Duke of Montrose
- Owner: EIC voyage #1:James Farquharson; EIC voyages #2-3:Robert Farquharson; EIC voyage #4:James Farquharson; EIC voyage #5-6:William Fraser; EIC voyage #7:Moses Agar; EIC voyage #8:William Masson
- Builder: Randall, Rotherhithe
- Launched: January 1785
- Fate: Sold 1811 for breaking up

General characteristics
- Tons burthen: 755, or 762, or 76258/94 (bm)
- Length: Overall:142 ft 10 1/2 in (43.5 m); Keel:116 ft 2 1/2 in (35.4 m) (keel)
- Beam: 35 ft 1 1/2 in (10.7 m)
- Depth of hold: 15 ft 0 in (4.6 m)
- Propulsion: Sails
- Sail plan: Full-rigged ship
- Complement: 1794:105; 1804:100
- Armament: 1794:26 × 9&6-pounder guns; 1804:26 × 9-pounder guns; 1810:14 × 9-pounder + 8 × 6-pounder guns; 1811:8 × 6-pounder + 14 × 12-pounder guns
- Notes: Three decks

Duke of Montrose was launched in 1785 as an East Indiaman. She made eight voyages for the British East India Company (EIC). She then briefly became a troop transport, sailing to the West Indies. She was sold in 1811 for breaking up.

== Career ==
EIC voyage #1 (1785-1787): Captain Alexander Gray sailed from Portsmouth on 22 March 1785, bound for Bombay and China. Duke of Montrose reached Madeira on 9 Aprirl, Johanna on 13 July, and Bombay on 6 August. She was at Tellicherry on 28 October, and she returned to Bombay on 26 November. She was at Anjengo on 31 March 1786 and Tellicherry on 8 April, but then returned to Bombay on 17 May. Sailing to China, she reached Malacca on 21 July, and arrived at Whampoa anchorage on 9 August. Homeward bound, she crossed the Second Bar on 16 November, reached St Helena on 14 March 1787, and arrived at Long Reach on 19 May.

EIC voyage #2 (1788-1789): Captain Joseph Dorin sailed from Portsmouth on 5 April 1788, bound for Bombay and China. Duke of Montrose reached Bombay on 5 August and Batavia on 25 November; she arrived at Whampoa on 8 February 1789. Homeward bound, she crossed the Second Bar on 11 March, reached St Helena on 14 March, and arrived at Gravesend on 1 September.

EIC voyage #3 (1792-1793 ): Captain Dorin sailed from The Downs on 8 March 1792, bound for Bombay. Duke of Montrose reached Bombay on 4 July. She then visited Tellicherry (3 October), Calicut (21 October), Anjengo (2 November), Calicut (13 November), and Tellicherry (17 November). She returned to Bombay on 8 December. Homeward bound, she reached St Helena on 13 March 1793, and arrived at Long Reach on 19 June.

The EIC inspected the East Indiamen as they arrived and on 15 October fined Doren and eight other captains £100 each for having not stowed their cargoes in conformance with the Company's orders. The money was to go to Poplar Hospital. (Note: There was a second assessment, on 30 July 1794 of a fine, but whether this was a restatement or a separate assessment is unclear.)

EIC voyage #4 (1794–1795): War with France had commenced shortly before Duke of Montrose had returned to England on her last voyage. Captain Patrick Burt acquired a letter of marque on 20 January 1794.

The British government held Duke of Montrose at Portsmouth, together with a number of other Indiamen in anticipation of using them as transports for an attack on Île de France (Mauritius). It gave up the plan and released the vessels in May 1794. It paid £1,291 13s 4d for having delayed her departure by 62 days.

Captain Burt sailed from Portsmouth on 2 May, bound for Bombay. Duke of Montrose arrived at Bombay on 4 September. She was at Calicut on 31 October, Anjengo on 12 November, Cochin on 24 November, and Tellicherry on 10 December. She returned to Bombay on 25 December. Homeward bound, she was at Tellicherry on 21 January 1795, reached st Helena on 18 March, and arrived at Long Reach on 25 July.

West Indies expedition (1795–1796): Duke of Montrose had no sooner returned to England when she joined Admiral Hugh Cloberry Christian's expedition to the West Indies. The Government chartered Duke of Montrose and a number of other EIC vessels, as transports.

The expedition sailed on 6 October, 16 November, and 9 December, but weather forced the vessels to put back. The fleet finally successfully sailed on 20 March to invade St Lucia, with troops under Lieutenant-General Sir Ralph Abercromby. St Lucia surrendered to the British on 25 May. The British went on to capture Saint Vincent and Grenada. (Note: One source states that Duke of Montrose sailed on 6 October from Plymouth for Martinique because the British government had "chartered her as a transport for the West Indian expedition to capture Martinique and Guadeloupe." Admiral Sir John Jervis captured Martinique, St. Lucia, and Guadeloupe in March and April 1794. The French recaptured Guadeloupe and St Lucia by mid-1795.)

On 27 July 1796 Duke of Montrose, from Martinique to London, joined the Jamaica Fleet. She arrived at Gravesend on 2 September.

EIC voyage #5 (1797–1799): Captain Burt sailed from Torbay on 22 September 1797, bound for Madras and Bengal. Duke of Montrose reached Madras on 3 February 1798, and arrived at Calcutta on 27 March. Homeward bound, she was at Saugor on 15 December and Pointe de Galle on 22 February. She reached St Helena on 18 May, and arrived at Gravesend on 1 August.

EIC voyage #6 (1801–1802): Captain Burt sailed from Portsmouth on 31 March 1801, bound for Madras and Bengal. Duke of Montrose reached Madras on 26 July, left on 11 August, and arrived at Diamond Harbour on 20 August. Homeward bound, she was at Saugor on 11 January 1802, reached St Helena on 14 June, and arrived at Long Reach on 22 August.

EIC voyage #7 (1804–1806): Captain John Paterson acquired a letter of marque on 25 June 1804. He sailed from Portsmouth on 10 July, bound for Madras and Bengal, and Duke of Montrose arrived back at her moorings on 17 February 1806.

She underwent a "good repair" in 1807.

EIC voyage #8 (1807–1808): Captain Paterson sailed from Portsmouth on 26 February 1807, bound for St Helena, Bengal and Penang. Duke of Montrose reached St Helena on 15 May and arrived at Diamond Harbour on 2 October. She was at Saugor on 24 November, and Penang on 15 December. She was back at Kedgeree on 9 February 1808. Homeward bound, she was at Saugor on 25 March, reached St Helena on 10September, and arrived at Long Reach on 23 December. On 28 December, however, she was off Dover, having lost her anchors and cables.

== Troop transport ==
In 1809, Duke of Montrose, William Masson, owner, hired her out as a troopship. She appears in Lloyd's Register in 1810 with Micahel, master, Mason, owner, and trade London–Martinique. The Register of Shipping for 1811 has her master as Connor, her owner as Massen, and her trade as London–Guadeloupe.

== Fate ==
In 1811 her owner sold Duke of Montrose for breaking up.
