= HMS Weymouth (1804) =

Frigate of the Royal Navy

History

Great Britain
- Name: Wellesley
- Namesake: Arthur Wellesley, 1st Duke of Wellington
- Owner: Lambert & Co.
- Builder: Hugh Edwards, Jonathan Gillett, & Michael Larkins, Calcutta
- Launched: 7 June 1796
- Fate: Sold 1804

United Kingdom
- Name: HMS Weymouth
- Acquired: May 1804
- Reclassified: As storeship from 1806; As convict ship from 1828
- Fate: Sold on 2 July 1865

General characteristics
- Class & type: 44-gun fifth rate
- Tons burthen: 826 bm
- Length: 136 ft (41.5 m) (overall); 121 ft (36.9 m) (keel)
- Beam: 37 ft (11.3 m)
- Depth of hold: 12 ft 4 in (3.8 m)
- Sail plan: Full-rigged ship
- Complement: Merchantman: 80; Storeship: 121
- Armament: Merchantman: 22 × 6- & 9-pounder guns; 12 × 9-pounder + 10 × 6-pounder guns; 44-gun ship: Lower deck: 26 × 18-pounder guns; Upper deck: 18 × 24-pounder carronades; Storeship; Lower deck: 10 × 24-pounder carronades; QD: 4 × 24-pounder carronades; Fc: 2 × 6-pounder guns

HMS Weymouth was a 44-gun fifth rate of the Royal Navy. She was previously the merchantman Wellesley, built in Calcutta in 1796. She successfully defended herself against a French frigate, and made two voyages to Britain as an East Indiaman for the East India Company. The Admiralty purchased her in May 1804; she then became a storeship in 1806. On her last voyage for the Royal Navy, in 1820, she carried settlers to South Africa. She was then laid up in ordinary. In 1828, she was converted to a prison ship and sailed to Bermuda where she served as a prison hulk until 1865 when she was sold for breaking up.

== Merchantman ==
In late 1799, the Commissioners of the Navy engaged Bellona and Wellesley to "convey stores, &c. to the different Settlements in India, on account of Government."

Wellesley was under the command of Captain Peter Gordon on 9 August 1800, when she encountered the French 36-gun frigate Franchise off the coast of Brazil. Wellesley was carrying provisions and stores for the fleet at the Cape and India; her crew consisted mostly of lascars and Chinese. The French frigate was the sole survivor from a surprising defeat of a French squadron in the action of 4 August 1800. Captain Pierre Jurien, of Franchise, attacked Wellesley, but Gordon succeeded in driving him off. Gordon had about ninety men, including passengers. The engagement lasted about an hour and although the frigate had 12-pounder guns to Wellesley's 9 and 6-pounders, the British suffered no casualties. The frigate tailed the British for some two days, but then gave up.

Wellesley's insurance company presented Gordon with a sugar bowl, tray, and pair of candlesticks, all inscribed, "Presented by the Bengal Phoenix Insurance Society to Capt. P. Gordon of the Wellesley for defending that ship against a French Frigate of 36 Guns on the coast of Brazil, the 9th of August 1800".

That autumn, The Times reported, "The following ships arrived at the Cape, and departed from thence in September and October (1800): The Bellona, Union, Sarah, Wellesley, Cecilia, Kent, and Thetis."

In 1801, Wellesley was designated a troop transport, one of a number of country ships that took, or were to take troops to Egypt as part of a force seeking to dislodge French forces there that threatened access to India. She carried a detachment of the 80th Regiment of Foot, but after eight weeks at sea she returned to Bombay. Gordon explained that it had been impossible to make safe passage to the Red Sea.

Wellesley first appeared in Lloyd's Register in the volume for 1801. Her master appeared as J. Purrier, and her owner as "Lambert". (Note: This appears to refer to John Purrier and the firm of Lambert, Ross & Co., owned by the merchants David Ross, James Scott, and William Hollings.) The register describeds her as trading between London and India, and being armed with twelve 9-pounder and ten 6-pounder guns.

In the next few years, Wellesley made two trips from Bengal to Britain for the British East India Company (EIC). Lloyd's Register published in mid-1802 shows Gordon replacing Purrier as master.

EIC voyage 1 (1801-1802): Captain Gordon acquired a letter of marque on 25 April 1800. Under his command, Wellesley passed Saugor on 8 December 1801, on her way to Britain. She reached St Helena on 24 February 1802, and arrived at the Downs on 9 June.

EIC voyage 2 (1803-1804): Gordon sailed Wellesley for England, leaving Madras on 20 August 1803. She reached St Helena on 8 November, Ventry Harbour, Ireland, on 13 January 1804, and Carrick Road on 7 February. She arrived at the Downs on 24 February.

== Royal Navy service ==
The Admiralty purchased Wellesley in May 1804 and between May and August she was in the yards of Perry & Co, at Rotherhithe for fitting out. Further fitting took place at Woolwich Dockyard in November. (Note: Lloyd's Register continued to show Wellesley as owned by Lambert, and with Gordon as master until 1813. Her armament was given as twelve 9-pounder and two 6-pounder guns.)

Weymouth was commissioned under the first commander, Captain Alexander Fraser, in August 1804. The following month Captain John Draper assumed command. Weymouth provided the naval escort for a convoy of five East Indiamen and two whalers that left Portsmouth on 1 February 1805. The Indiamen were Earl of Abergavenny, Royal George, Henry Addington, Wexford, and Bombay Castle. On 5 February the incompetence of her pilot caused the loss of Earl of Abergavenny and 263 of the people on board. The convoy continued on with Weymouth going on to India.

Weymouth returned to Britain in 1806, having left Madras on 8 September 1805 escorting Airly Castle, Baring, Duke of Montrose Lord Hawkesbury, and Devaynes. She was then fitted as a storeship at Woolwich, recommissioning in September 1807 under Commander Martin White. White made two voyages to the Mediterranean, after which she operated in the North Sea by 1809.

She passed under a succession of masters over the next few years. While under the command of Richard Turner, master, in August 1815 she accompanied the 74-gun Northumberland, and the troopship HMS Ceylon as Northumberland carried Napoleon into exile at Saint Helena.

She was at St Helena on 15 November 1815. On 14 September 1817, she was at Lebida (Leptis Magna), together with Aid. There they loaded columns, marbles, and other antiquities. Weymouth then left for Malta. In March 1818, she delivered them at Deptford, together with a nine-ton granite head that at the time was believed to be that of Memnon, King of Abydos, Egypt. Henry Salte, the British Consul General to Egypt had sent it as a present to the British Museum, and Weymouth had loaded it at Malta.

In 1820, Weymouth visited the Cape Colony. On this voyage she embarked 478 British 1820 Settlers at Portsmouth to take them to Algoa Bay. Captain Turner left Portsmouth on 7 January 1820, arrived in Table Bay on 25 April 1820. At Simon's Bay, Weymouth took on board the immigrants that had come on Stentor. Weymouth arrived in Algoa Bay on 15 May 1820.

== Fate ==
Weymouth was laid up in ordinary at Deptford in November 1821. Between February and October 1828 she was fitted out as a prison ship. In September William Miller became master, and in 1829 sailed her to Bermuda. There she served as a prison hulk. On 12 September 1839, her bows were severely damaged in a hurricane at Ireland Island, Bermuda. She was described as a victualling depot ship of 1,160 tons.

Weymouth was finally sold there for £300 on 2 July 1865 and was broken up.

== Legacy ==
At Fairbairn College, Cape Town, one of the sports fields is named after HMS Weymouth.
