= Warley (1796 ship) =

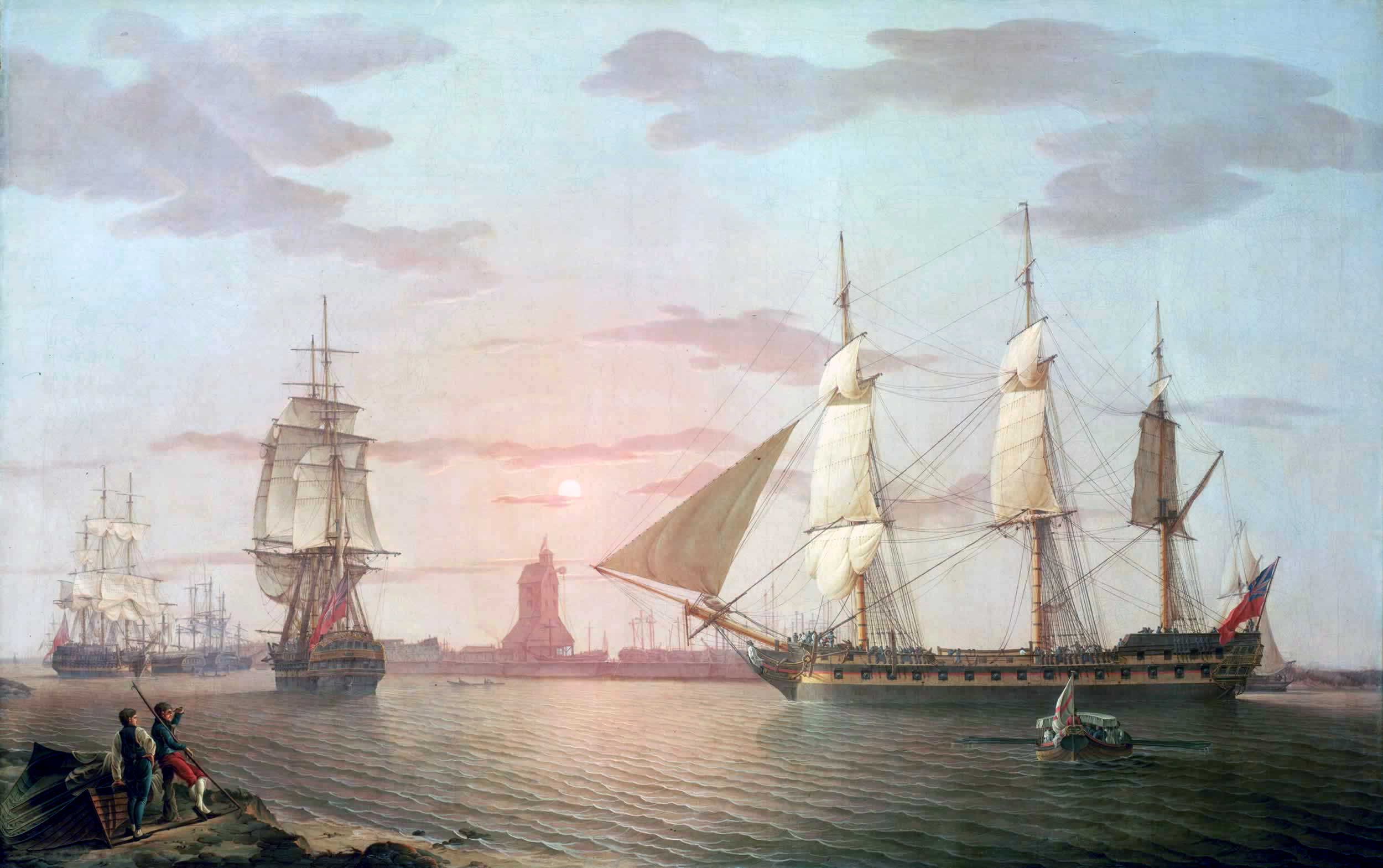
- 1801 painting of Warley by Robert Salmon

History

East India CompanyGreat Britain
- Name: Warley
- Owner: Voyages 1–6:Henry Boulton; Voyages 7–9:Martin Lindsay
- Builder: Perry & Co., Blackwall
- Launched: 15 November 1796
- Fate: Broken up 1816

General characteristics
- Type: East Indiaman
- Tons burthen: 1460, or 1498, or 147060/94 (bm)
- Length: 176 ft 5 in (53.8 m) (overall); 143 ft 5 5/8 in (43.7 m) (keel)
- Beam: 43 ft 9 in (13.3 m)
- Depth of hold: 17 ft 6 1/2 in (5.3 m)
- Complement: 140; 160
- Armament: 1st letter of marque: 34 × 18-pounder guns + 12 × 6-pounder guns.; 2nd letter of marque: 32 × 18-pounder guns + 12 × 6-pounder guns; Letter of marque against America: 32 × 12-pounder guns

Warley, launched in 1796, was one of the British East India Company's (EIC), larger and more famous East Indiamen. She made nine voyages to the East between 1796 and 1816, most direct to China. In 1804, she participated in the Battle of Pulo Aura. In 1816, the company sold her for breaking up.

== Origins ==
She was the second East Indiaman named Warley that John Perry built at his yard in Blackwall Yard. Perry built her predecessor in 1788; in 1795 the EIC sold the first of Perry's Warleys to the Royal Navy, which renamed her HMS Calcutta.

Warley's captain for her first five voyages was Henry Wilson, who had also been captain of the first Warley for her two voyages.

== Voyages 1, 2 and 3 ==
Warley sailed under a letter of marque dated 1 January 1797, which named Wilson as the captain.

=== Voyage 1 (1797–1798) ===
Captain Henry Wilson sailed on 18 March 1797, from Portsmouth, bound for Bombay and China. Warley arrived at Bombay on 4 July, and left on 1 October. She stopped at Tellicherry on 9 October, Cochin on 18 October, and Anjengo on 23 October, before arriving at Whampoa on 8 January 1798. Homeward bound, she crossed the Second Bar on 25 March, reached St Helena on 5 August, and arrived at the Downs on 18 October.

=== Voyage 2 (1799–1800) ===
Captain Wilson left Portsmouth on 18 June 1799, bound for China. By 30 October she had reached Penang, and she arrived at Whampoa on 16 January 1800. Homeward bound, she crossed the Second Bar on 29 March, reached St Helena on 15 July, and arrived at the Downs on 23 September. She anchored at London on 2 October 1800.

=== Voyage 3 (1801–1802) ===
Captain Henry Wilson sailed from Portsmouth on 19 May 1801, bound for China. Warley reached Rio de Janeiro on 1 August and Penang on 31 October. She arrived at Whampoa on 30 January 1802. Homeward bound, she crossed the Second Bar on 30 March, reached St Helena on 10 July, and arrived at the Downs on – 5 September. She anchored at London returned on 9 September.

On her return Warley required extensive repairs as leaks had plagued her throughout her return voyage.

== Voyage 4 (1803–1804) & the Battle of Pulo Aura ==
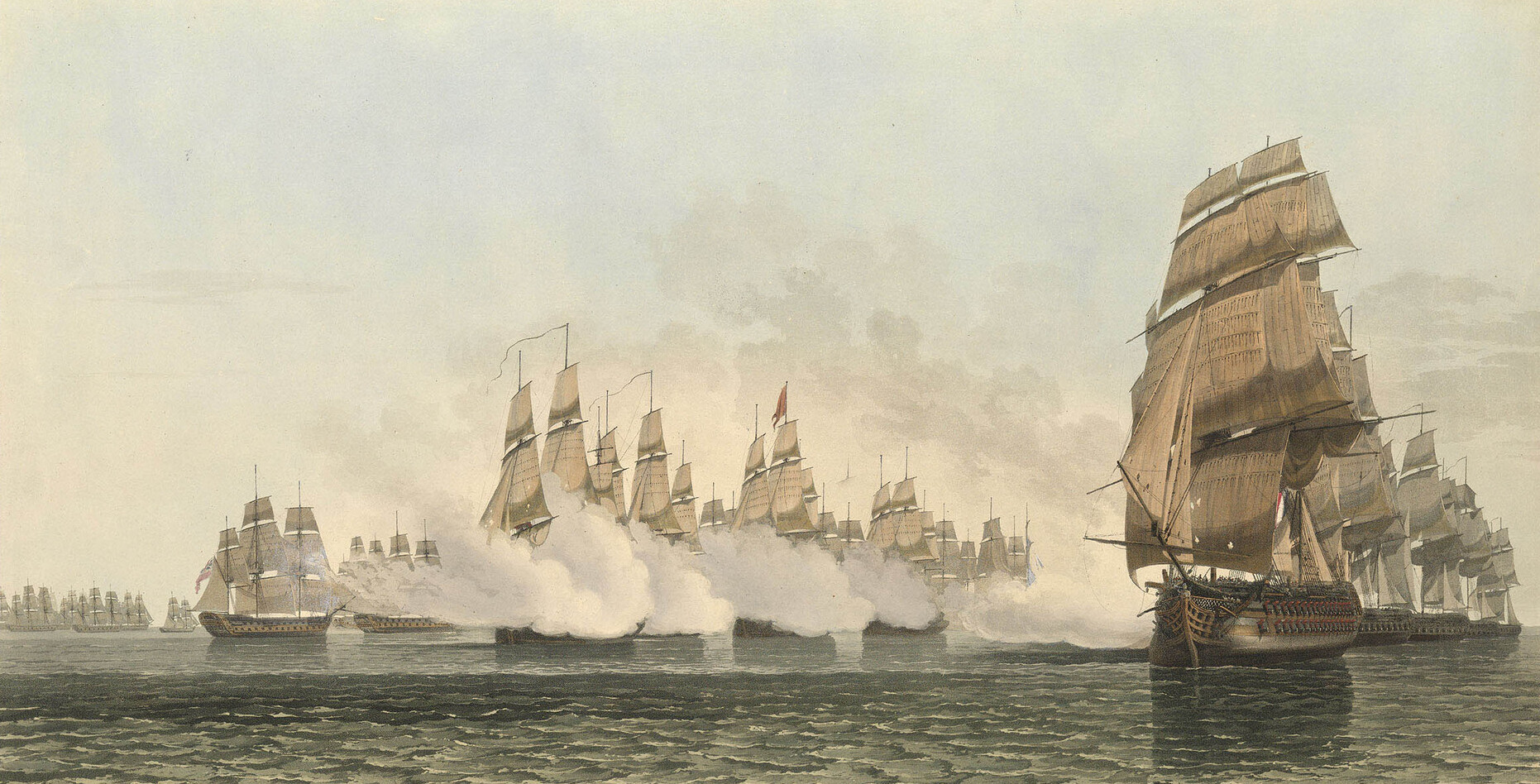
Defeat of Adml. Linois by Commodore Dance, Feby. 15th. 1804, by William Daniel

The Napoleonic Wars having broken out, Wilson took out a second letter of marque, this one dated 20 June 1803. Warley left Britain on 6 May 1803, for China, and arrived at Whampoa on 12 November. It was on the return leg of this voyage that Warley had her greatest moment of glory. She crossed the Second Bar on 2 February 1804. Wilson, in Warley, was second in command to Nathaniel Dance, who commanded the East Indiamen that were sailing in convoy back from China. As they were passing through the Straits of Malacca, they encountered a French squadron under Rear-Admiral the Comte de Linois, who hoped to seize as many of them as he could.

Dance ordered his fleet to form a line of battle, while creating a bluff that four of his Indiamen were a squadron of ships of the line escorting the convoy. A skirmish ensued with the result that Linois, somewhat inexplicably, withdrew. Warley reached Penang on 1 March, and St Helena on 9 June. She arrived at the Downs on 8 August. Warley arrived back at London on 14 August 1804. Warley played a significant part and Lloyd's Patriotic Fund voted Wilson 500 guineas and a piece of plate worth 50 guineas. All the other captains received similar awards, with the officers and crews also receiving awards. Dance refused a baronetcy but was subsequently knighted.

== Voyages 5 to 9 ==
=== Voyage 5 (1805–1806) ===
Captain Henry Wilson sailed from Portsmouth on 24 April 1805, bound for Madras and China. Warley reached Madras on 28 August, Penang on 18 September, and Malacca only on 22 October. She arrived at Whampoa on 1 January 1806. Homeward bound, she crossed the Second Bar on 28 February, returned to Malacca on 16 March, and Penang on 28 March, reached St Helena on 2 July, and arrived at the Downs on 3 September. She anchored on 7 September 1806.

=== Voyage 6 (1807–1809) ===
Captain William Augustus Montague took over command. He sailed on 22 June 1807 from Portsmouth, bound for Madras, Ceylon, Bombay, and China. By 15 September she had reached Simons Bay. Warley was in company with Wexford, both requiring repairs, and HMS St Albans. They were carrying troops of the 47 Regiment of Foot, as were several transports, all for Madras. On 14 October she was at the Cape of Good Hope. Warley and Wexford, and the transports, then sailed for Madras on 17 October, under convoy by HMS Greyhound.

Warley and Wexford reached Madras on 30 December, and Colombo on 22 January 1808. There they separated and Warley was at Tellicherry on 8 February, Managalore three days later, and Bombay on 2 March. She reached Penang on 15 June, and arrived at Whampoa on 7 July. She crossed the Second Bar on 5 March 1809, reached St Helena on 5 August, and arrived at Blackwall on 10 December.

=== Voyage 7 (1811–1812) ===
Captain John Collins left Portsmouth on 8 April 1811 for China via Simons Bay (13 July), and Penang (30 August), arriving at Whampoa on 22 October. She crossed the Second Bar on 12 January 1812, and returned on 14 May, having stopped in St Helena on 21 March.

=== Voyage 8 (1813–—1814) ===
Collins left Portsmouth on 18 March 1813, for Madras and China, sailing under a letter of marque against America. Warley sailed via Tenerife (11 April), and Johanna, Comoro Islands (13 July), arriving at Madras on 9 August. She then sailed via Penang (31 August), and Malacca (15 September), arriving at Whampoa on 25 October. She left crossed the Second Bar on 22 February 1814, and by 6 August was in the Downs, having stopped at St Helena on 26 May.

=== Voyage 9 (1815–1816) ===
Collins left the Downs on 3 April 1815, and reached Whampoa on 11 September. Warley crossed the Second Bar on 3 December, reached St Helena on 3 March 1816, and arrived at the Downs on 29 April. This was her last voyage.

When Warley arrived back at London she discharged her crew, including her Chinese sailors hired in Canton. Princess Amelia repatriated 17 to Canton, together with 363 others, leaving the Downs on 20 July 1816.

== Fate ==
Warley was sold on 26 July 1816, at Lloyd's Coffee House for breaking up.

== Notable passengers ==
- The first academic director of the Royal Naval College, Portsmouth, when it commenced operations in 1808, was Professor James Inman, who had returned to Britain from Port Jackson on Warley. He was on board during the Battle of Pulo Auro and commanded a party of Lascar pikemen.
- The marine painter Clarkson Stanfield joined the merchant service under the name "Patrick Bland" as a seaman on board Warley and sailed for China in 1815. He made numerous sketches on the voyage, which gave him material for his subsequent career.
