= Devaynes (1802 EIC ship) =

UK ship trading with India (1802–1817)

History

United Kingdom
- Name: Devaynes
- Namesake: William Devaynes
- Owner: EIC voyages 1–3: Samuel Favell; EIC voyages 4–6: Andrew Timbrell
- Builder: Humble, Liverpool, or Dudman
- Launched: 27 April 1802
- Fate: Condemned circa August 1817

General characteristics
- Tons burthen: 604, 60448/94, or 621, or 622 (bm)
- Length: Overall:125 ft 7 in (38.3 m); Keel:100 ft 0 1/4 in (30.5 m)
- Beam: 33 ft 8 1/2 in (10.3 m)
- Depth of hold: 13 ft 0 in (4.0 m)
- Complement: 1804: 60; 1808: 60; 1811: 55
- Armament: 1804: 18 × 12-pounder carronades; 1808: 18 × 12-pounder carronades; 1811: 18 × 12-pounder carronades

Devaynes was launched in 1802 and made six voyages as an East Indiaman for the British East India Company (EIC). She then made one more round trip to India, sailing under a license from the EIC. She was condemned in Bengal in 1817 on a second licensed voyage to Bengal.

== Career ==
On 2 October 1801, the EIC agreed with George Clay, Esq., that Devaynes (which had not yet been launched), would perform six voyages for the EIC at a freight rate of £13 15s per ton, for 600 tons.

1st EIC voyage (1802–1804): Captain William Adderley sailed from the Downs on 17 August 1802, bound for Madras. Devaynes reached the Cape on 21 November and Madras on 12 February 1830. She arrived at Calcutta on 17 March and Kedgeree on 26 May. Homeward bound, she was at Saugor on 11 July, reached St Helena on 15 February 1804, and arrived at Gravesend on 30 April.

2nd EIC voyage (1804−1806): Captain Adderley acquired a letter of marque on 9 August 1804. He sailed from Portsmouth on 4 September 1804, bound for Bombay and Madras. Devaynes was at Madeira on 27 September and Cochin on 13 February 1805. She reached Bombay on 4 March and Madras on 3 June. Homeward bound, she sailed from Madras on 10 September, but being leaky, three days later she parted from the other Indiamen with which she was in company and supposedly ailed for Calcutta. Instead, she sailed to Penang, where she refitted. She sailed for London in November, and reached St Helena on 5 February 1806. She arrived back at the Downs on 14 June.

3rd EIC voyage (1807–1808): Captain Adderley sailed from Portsmouth on 4 January 1807, bound for Madras and Bengal. Devaynes was at the Cape on 15 April, reached Madras on 11 June, and arrived at Kidderpore on 25 July. Homeward bound, she was at Saugor on 26 September and Madras on 22 October. She reached the Cape on 31 December and St Helena on 25 January 1808. she arrived at the Downs on 4 April.

4th EIC voyage (1808–1810): Captain James Normand acquired a letter of marque on 15 August 1808. Normand (or Mormand), sailed from Portsmouth on 17 September 1808, bound for Bombay, Madras, and Bengal. Devaynes was at Madeira on 29 September, Colombo on 22 February 1809, and Goa on 18 March. She arrived at Bombay on 26 May. From there she reached Madras on 17 May and arrived at Diamond Harbour on 28 June. In August she grounded in the Bengal River and had to go into dock to repair. Homeward bound she was Kidderpore on 13 September and Saugor on 2 November. She reached Madras on 19 December, the Cape on 19 February 1810, and St Helena on 15 April. She arrived at Gravesend on 6 June and Woolwich on 7 July.

5th EIC voyage (1811–1812): Capt Octavius Brooks acquired a letter of marque on 7 February 1811. He sailed from Torbay on 12 May, bound for Madras and Bengal. Devaynes reached Madras on 12 September and arrived at Calcutta on 21 October. Homeward bound, she was at Saugor on 24 December, reached St Helena on 12 May 1812, and arrived at Gravesend on 26 July.

6th EIC voyage (1813–1814): Captain John Short sailed from Portsmouth on 18 March 1813, bound for Madras and Bengal. Devaynes reached Madras on 17 August and arrived at Calcutta on 23 September. Homeward bound, she was at Saugor on 6 November, Point de Galle on 29 December, and the Cape on 1 March. She reached St Helena on 18 March and arrived at Blackwall on 4 June.

In 1813, the EIC had lost its monopoly on the trade between India and Britain. British ships were then free to sail to India or the Indian Ocean under a license from the EIC. Devaynes's owners applied for such a licence on 18 April 1814 and received it the next day.

On 21 May 1815, Devaynes, Brooks, master, sailed from Gravesend, bound for India. On 6 May 1816 she arrived back at Gravesend, having come from Batavia.

On 12 August 1816, Devaynes, Brooks, master, sailed from Gravesend, bound for Bombay. She arrived at Bengal before 10 January 1817, and sailed for London prior to 17 February.

== Fate ==
Devaynes sailed from Bengal for London in the second week of June 1817. She sustained damage and became leaky. In July she put back to Diamond Harbour, and it was expected that she would be condemned. In February 1818 Lloyd's List reported that Devaynes had been condemned.
