= Poplar Hospital =

Former hospital in London, England

Coordinates: 51°30′42.36″N 0°0′25.38″W

Shown in a postcard around 1912

Poplar Hospital was a medical facility opened in East India Dock Road in London, England, in 1855. It was opened under the patronage of Samuel Gurney, MP, to treat people who had suffered injuries in the docks. The premises which were leased for the hospital were originally those of the East India Dock Tavern and then subsequently the Custom House.

Under Sydney Holland's chairmanship the hospital was able to expand considerably in the late nineteenth century. Holland was well known for his successful fundraising, for which he earned the nickname 'Prince of Beggars'. In a four-year period Holland raised sufficient funds to enlarge the hospital from 36 to over 100 beds, improved the nursing care, and the hospital's reputation.

The hospital was repeatedly expanded to cater for more patients, only being closed in 1975. It was demolished in 1982.

In Illustrated London News in 1858

From the seventeenth to the early nineteenth century, the British East India Company (EIC) maintained a hospital in the area known as Poplar Hospital. The hospital had been established in March 1628 as an almshouse for its mariners.

== Notable staff ==
- Emma Pilcher (abt 1845– ), Matron 1883 – until about 1891. She had previously trained at St Thomas's Hospital and Inverness. Pilcher was the first of three London Hospital nurses to work as Matron at Poplar in succession for over a forty-year period.
- Gertrude Vacher (abt 1864– ), Matron 1891–1895. Vacher trained at The London Hospital as both a paying and ordinary probationer between 1885 and 1887. Whilst matron at Poplar she was seriously ill with pneumonia, and resigned following her recovery. Sydney Holland purchased a grave plot at Brompton Cemetery, and organised death announcements.
- Selina Elizabeth Bland (1855–1931), Matron 1895–1926. Bland trained at The London Hospital under Eva Luckes from 1895 to 1897. Bland's application was supported by the House Committee at The London, and Sydney Holland, The Poplar Hospital Chairman, was very pleased with other London Hospital trained nurses who had moved to nurse at Poplar.

== Citations and references ==
Citations

References

- Makepeace, Margaret (2010) The East India Company's London Workers: Management of the Warehouse Labourers, 1800–1858. (Boydell & Brewer). ISBN 9781843835851
