= Ocean (1800 EIC ship) =

History

Great Britain
- Name: Ocean
- Operator: British East India Company
- Builder: Thomas Pitcher & Sons, London
- Launched: 18 October 1800
- Fate: Foundered 1811

General characteristics
- Type: East Indiaman
- Tons burthen: 1200 (rated), 1273 (measured), 1337, 13374/94 (bm)
- Length: 165 ft 11 1/2 in (50.6 m) (overall); 134 ft 1 3/8 in (40.9 m) (keel)
- Beam: 42 ft 3 in (12.9 m)
- Depth of hold: 17 ft (5.2 m)
- Sail plan: Full-rigged ship
- Complement: 130–140 men
- Armament: 34 or 36 × 6- & 12-pounder guns

Ocean was an East Indiaman, launched in 1800, that made four trips for the Honourable East India Company. She is most famous for her participation, in 1804, in the battle of Pulo Aura. She foundered in 1811 while on her fifth trip.

== Career ==
=== Voyage #1 (1801–02) ===
Captain Andrew Patton sailed Ocean for Bombay and China. He had been captain of the company's previous Ocean, which had wrecked in 1797. Because the French Revolutionary Wars were still on going, Patton acquired a letter of marque, which was dated 10 December 1800.

Ocean left Portsmouth on 9 January 1801 and reached on 22 May. From there she sailed for China. She reached Whampoa on 6 October. On the return leg she crossed the Second Bar on 7 December. She arrived at Saint Helena on 12 April 1802, and The Downs on 10 June.

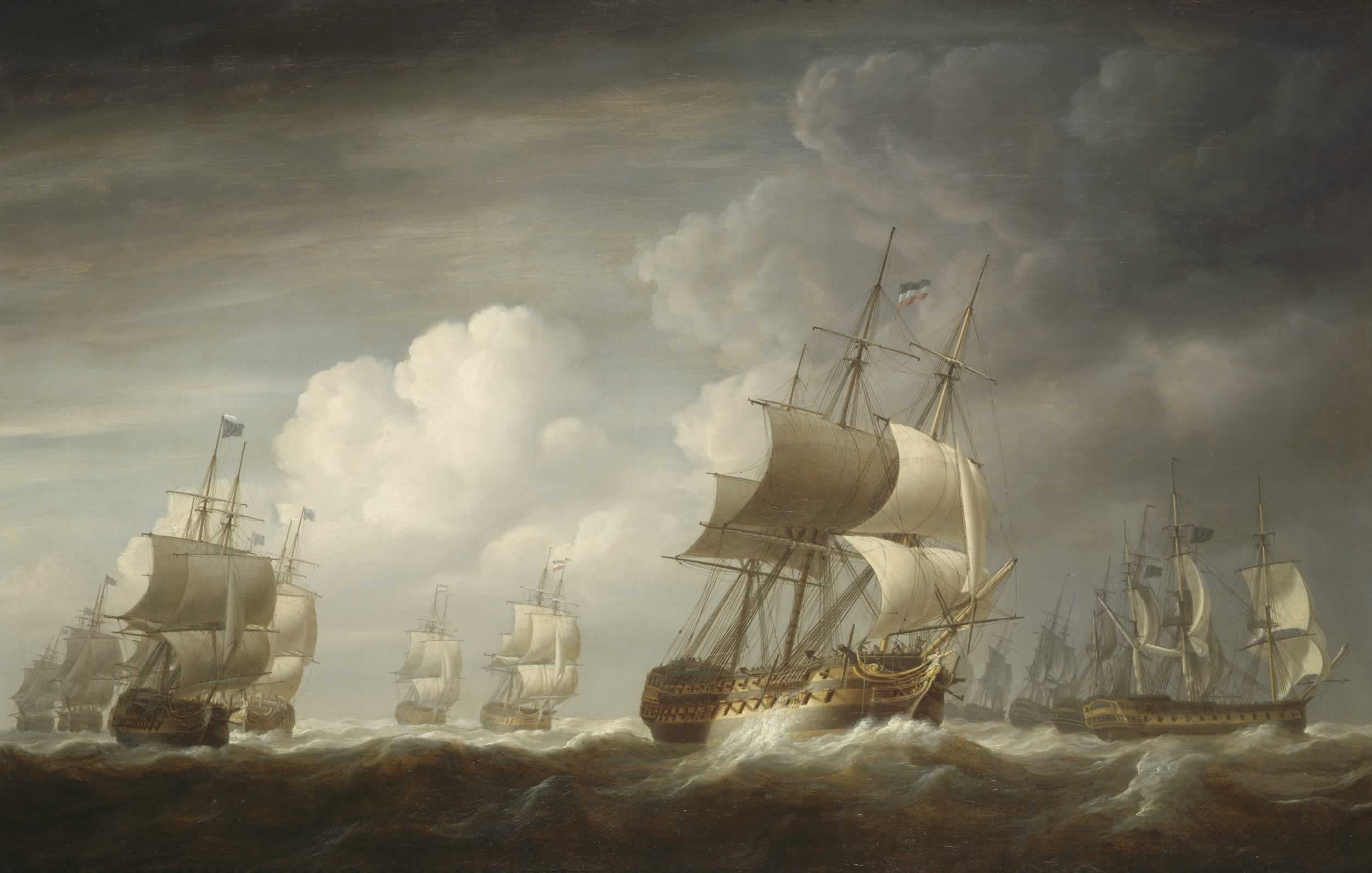
A fleet of East Indiamen at Sea, by Nicholas Pocock; it is believed to show the Indiamen Lord Hawkesbury, Worcester, Boddam, Fort William, Airly Castle, Lord Duncan, Ocean, Henry Addington, Carnatic, Hope and Windham returning from China in 1802

=== Voyage #2 (1802–04) ===
On Ocean's second voyage, Patton was again her captain and he left The Downs on 13 October 1802 for the Cape of Good Hope, Madras, Bombay and China. After the resumption of war with France in 1803, Patton posthumously received a new letter of marque dated 1 July 1803 for the same vessel, with a crew of 140 men and 36 guns. Patton died at Bombay in June 1803; Ocean's first lieutenant, John Christian Lochner, became captain and it was he that commanded her at the battle of Pulo Aura.

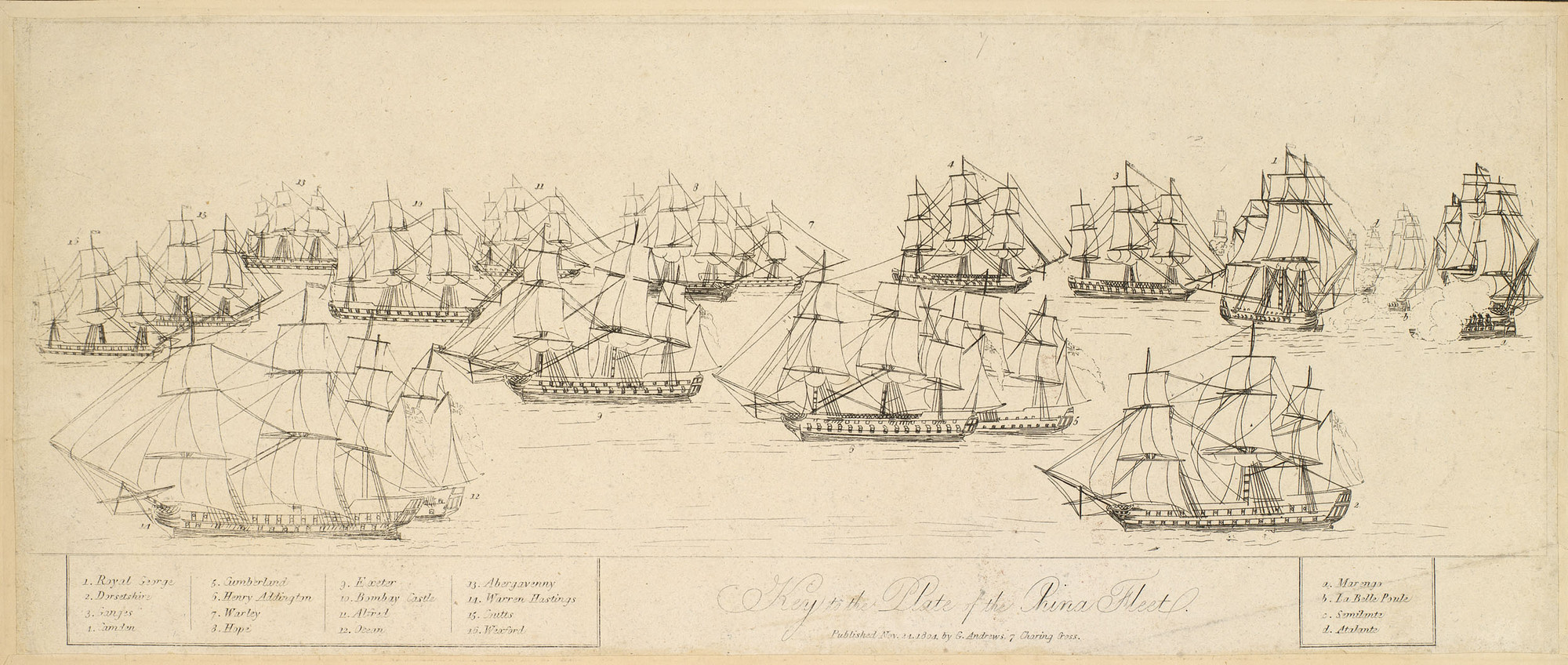
Ocean can be seen in this printed key for a view of the Battle, showing the China Fleet a painting by Francis Sartorius, the younger after a drawing by an officer on board the Henry Addington

On 14 February 1804, the China Fleet, under the command of Commodore Nathaniel Dance, intimidated, drove off and chased a powerful French naval squadron at Pulo Aura. Dance's aggressive tactics persuaded Contre-Admiral Charles-Alexandre Durand Linois to retire after only a brief exchange of fire. Dance then chased the French warships until his convoy was out of danger, whereupon he resumed his passage towards British India.

Ocean reached Britain on 15 August 1804.

The EIC voted a £50,000 prize fund to be divided among the various commanders at the battle and their crews. Farrer received 500 guineas, and also a piece of plate worth 50 guineas. Lloyd's Patriotic Fund and other national and mercantile institutions made a series of awards of ceremonial swords, silver plate, and monetary gifts to individual officers. Lloyd's Patriotic Fund gave each captain a sword worth £50, and one worth £100 to Nathaniel Dance. Dance refused a baronetcy but was subsequently knighted.

=== Voyage #3 (1805–06) ===
Captain John(s) James Williamson became captain of Ocean for this and her next two voyages. The change of captain required the issuing of a new letter of marque. This one was dated 17 December 1804.

On her third voyage she left Portsmouth on 8 March 1805, bound for Madras and China. She reached Madeira on 26 March, and Madras on 14 July.

This voyage also saw combat, but of a more minor sort. On 7 August Ocean was in company with the East Indiamen Henry Addington, Dorsetshire, and Cumberland in a convoy escorted by naval vessels under the command of Sir Thomas Troubridge. The British exchanged fire with three French warships that included Belle Poule and Marengo, which did not press the attack. (Note: Biden gives the name of Ocean's master as Lochner.)

By 27 August Ocean was at Penang, and then on 14 September she was at Malacca. She reached Whampoa on 22 December. On the return leg Ocean was "off Chumpee" (Chuenpee) in the Bocca Tigris, the estuary of the Pearl River, on 26 February 1806. She reached St Helena on 2 July, and arrived at the Downs on 3 September.

=== Voyage #4 (1808–09) ===
On Her fourth voyage, Ocean left Portsmouth on 5 March 1808, sailing for China. She reached the Cape of Good Hope on 31 May. From there she sailed to Madras, which she reached on 3 August. From there she sailed to Penang (22 August) and Malacca (3 September), before reaching Whampoa on 2 October. On the return leg she crossed the Second Bar on 2 February 1809. She reached St Helena on 7 July, and The Downs on 8 September.

=== Voyage #5 (1810-loss) ===
Ocean was again under the command of Captain Williamson when she departed in January 1810 for St. Helena, Bencoolen, and China. Ocean apparently foundered off Pulo Sapate in 1811. (Note: The Dutch referred to the island as Pulau Sapate or Sapata (Unfortunately, the island's Indonesian name is not clear).) Because the ship foundered, there is little further information.

The EIC valued the cargo lost on her at £21,202. She appears on a list of vessels that are believed to have disappeared in typhoons in the India or China Seas.
