= Henry Addington (1800 EIC ship) =

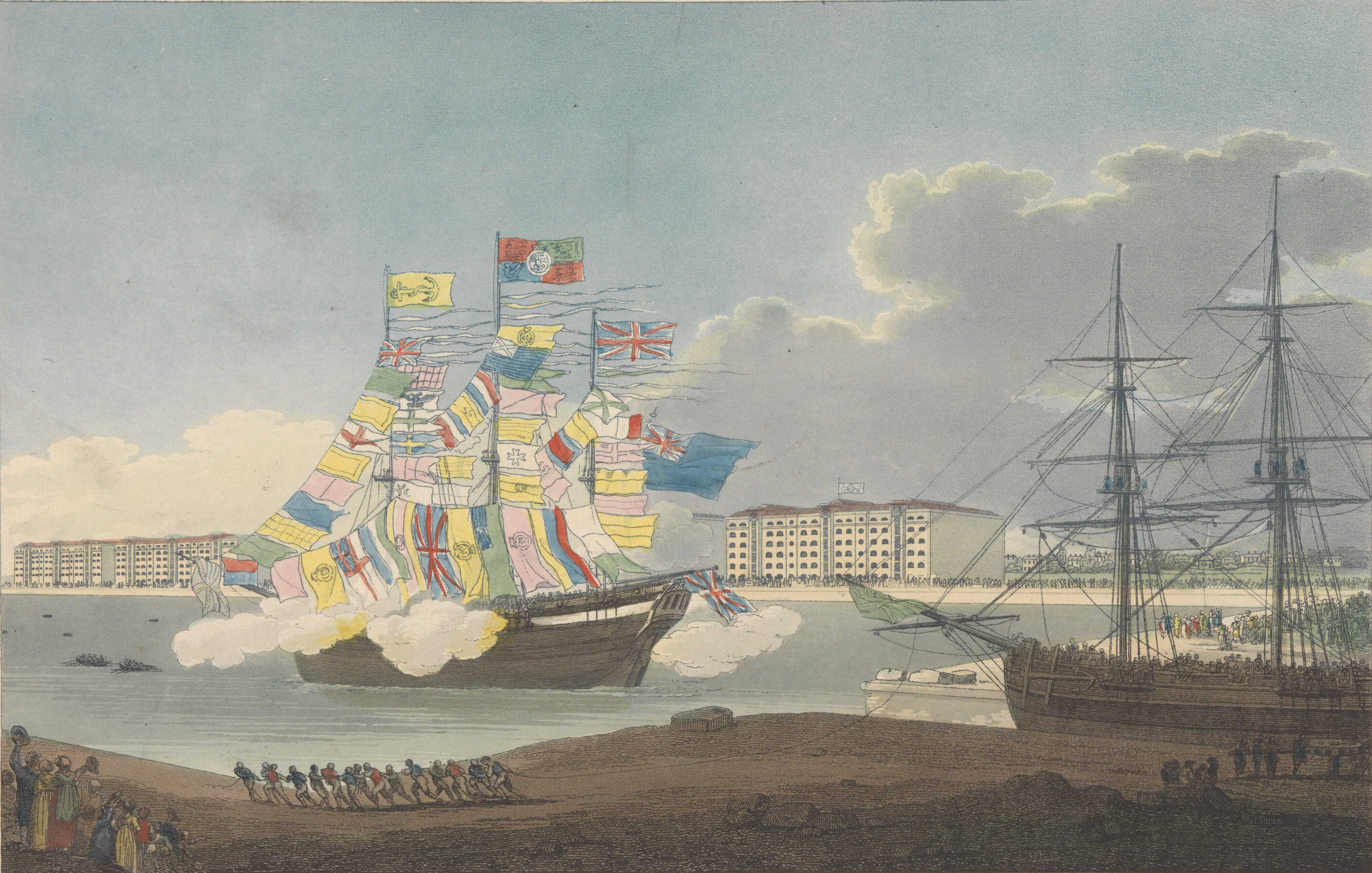
- The Henry Addington on 27 August 1802 at the opening of the West India docks, also shown on the far right is the Echo, the second ship to enter the docks

History

Great Britain
- Name: Henry Addington
- Namesake: Henry Addington, 1st Viscount Sidmouth
- Owner: Voyages #1-5: Sir Alexander Hamilton; Voyages #6-7: David Hunter
- Builder: Wells, Deptford
- Launched: 20 October 1800
- Fate: Sold for breaking up in 1815

General characteristics
- Tons burthen: 1262, or 1330, or 133053/94, or 1477 (bm)
- Length: 165 ft 6 in (50.4 m) (overall), 133 ft 11 3/4 in (40.8 m) (keel)
- Beam: 42 ft 1 in (12.8 m)
- Depth of hold: 17 ft 2 in (5.2 m)
- Sail plan: Full-rigged ship
- Complement: 1800:100; 1804:135
- Armament: 36 × 12&9-pounder guns
- Notes: Three decks

Henry Addington was launched in 1800 as an East Indiaman for the British East India Company (EIC). She made seven voyages for the EIC before she was sold in 1815 for breaking up. She was one of the vessels at the Battle of Pulo Aura in 1804.

== Career ==
=== EIC voyage #1 (1801-1802) ===
Captain Thomas Wakefield received a letter of marque on 13 December 1800. Wakefield sailed from Portsmouth on 9 January 1801, bound for Bombay and China. Henry Addington reached Bombay on 22 May, and arrived at Whampoa Anchorage on 6 October. Homeward bound, she crossed the second Bar on 17 December, reached St Helena on 12 April 1802, and arrived at Long Reach on 11 June.

When the West India Docks officially opened on 27 August, she became the first ship to enter. As an East Indiaman, she took precedence over all other types of merchantmen.

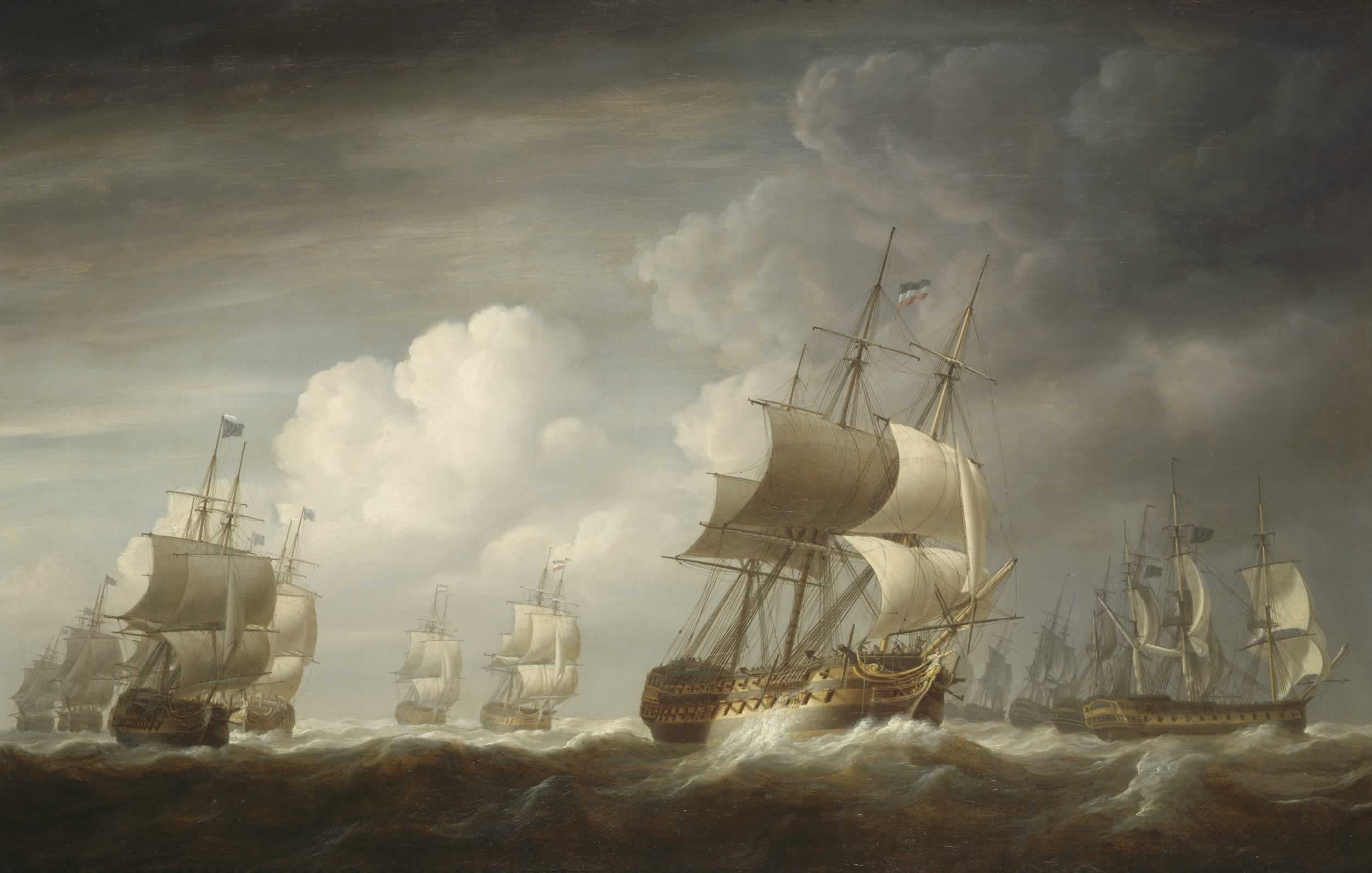
A fleet of East Indiamen at Sea, by Nicholas Pocock; it is believed to show the Indiamen Lord Hawkesbury, Worcester, Boddam, Fort William, Airly Castle, Lord Duncan, Ocean, Henry Addington, Carnatic, Hope, and Windham returning from China in 1802

=== EIC voyage #2 (1802-1804) ===
Captain Kirkpatrick left the Downs on 13 October 1802, bound for the Cape of Good Hope, Madras, Bombay, and China. Because he left during peacetime, he did not acquire a letter of marque. Henry Addington reached the Cape on 20 December, Bombay on 8 May 1803, and Whampoa on 5 September. Homeward bound with the China fleet, she crossed the Second Bar on 13 November.

On 14 February 1804, the China Fleet, under the command of Commodore Nathaniel Dance, intimidated, drove off and chased a powerful French naval squadron at Pulo Aura. Dance's aggressive tactics persuaded Contre-Admiral Charles-Alexandre Durand Linois to retire after only a brief exchange of fire. Dance then chased the French warships until his convoy was out of danger, whereupon he resumed his passage towards British India.

Henry Addington was at Malacca on 18 February 1804 and Penang on 2 March. She reached St Helena on 9 June, and arrived at The Downs on 8 August.

The EIC voted a £50,000 prize fund to be divided among the various commanders at the battle and their crews. Farrer received 500 guineas, and also a piece of plate worth 50 guineas. Lloyd's Patriotic Fund and other national and mercantile institutions made a series of awards of ceremonial swords, silver plate, and monetary gifts to individual officers. Lloyd's Patriotic Fund gave each captain a sword worth £50, and one worth £100 to Nathaniel Dance. Dance refused a baronetcy but was subsequently knighted.

=== EIC voyage #3 (1805-1806) ===
Captain John Kirkpatrick acquired a letter of marque on 19 December 1804. He sailed from Portsmouth on 17 February 1805 bound for Bombay and China. Henry Addington reached Bombay on 20 June.

This voyage also saw combat, but of a more minor sort. On 7 August Henry Addington was in company with the East Indiamen Ocean, Dorsetshire, and Cumberland in a convoy escorted by naval vessels under the command of Sir Thomas Troubridge. The British exchanged fire with three French warships that included Belle Poule and Marengo, which did not press the attack.

Henry Addington was at Penang on 23 September and Malacca on 10 October. She reached Whampoa on 25 December. Homeward bound she was again at Malacca on 18 March 1806, and Penang on 27 March. She reached St Helena on 2 July, and arrived at The Downs on 3 September.

=== EIC voyage #4 (1807-1808) ===
Captain Kirkpatrick sailed from Portsmouth on 26 February 1807, bound for Madras and China. Henry Addington returned to Long Reach on 1 July 1808.

=== EIC voyage #5 (1809-1810) ===
Captain Kirkpatrick sailed from Portsmouth on 21 June 1809, bound for Bengal. Henry Addington arrived at Saugor on 4 November. Homeward bound, she was at Madras on 4 February 1810, Point de Galle on 17 February, and St Helena on 3 May. She arrived at The Downs on 6 July.

=== EIC voyage #6 (1811-1812) ===
Captain Kirkpatrick sailed from Torbay on 16 February 1811, bound for Bombay and China. She reached Simon's Bay on 18 April, and arrived at Bombay on 8 June. She arrived at Whampoa on 2 October. Homeward bound, she crossed the Second Bar on 13 December, reached St Helena on 31 March 1812, and arrived at The Downs on 13 May.

=== EIC voyage #7 (1814-1815) ===
Captain Kirkpatrick sailed from Portsmouth on 8 April 1814, bound for China. Henry Addington was at Kedah on 16 August, Malacca on 14 September, and Lintin Roads on 21 October. She arrived at Whampoa on 30 November. Homeward bound, she crossed the Second Bar on 20 January 1815, reached St Helena on 12 May, and arrived at The Downs on 19 August.

== Fate ==
Henry Addington was sold in 1815 to David Hunter, who in turn sold her to ship-breakers.
