= HMS Blanche =

Ten ships of the Royal Navy have borne the name HMS Blanche:

- HMS Blanche (1779) was a 36-gun fifth rate captured from the French in 1779. She foundered in 1780.
- HMS Blanche (1786) was a 32-gun fifth rate launched in 1786, at Bursledon and wrecked in 1799 off Holland.
- HMS Blanche (1800) was a 36-gun fifth rate launched in 1800 and captured and burnt in 1805 by four French ships off Puerto Rico.
- HMS Blanche was a 38-gun fifth rate, previously the Spanish ship Amfitrite. She was captured by Sir Richard Strachan in HMS Donegal in 1804 and taken into service as HMS Amfitrite, and renamed HMS Blanche in 1805. She was wrecked off Ushant in 1807.
- HMS Blanche was a 28-gun sixth rate, previously the French privateer Bellone. HMS Powerful, assisted by Rattlesnake, captured her off Ceylon in the action of 9 July 1806. She was taken into service as HMS Bellona and was renamed HMS Blanche in 1809, before being broken up in 1814.
- HMS Blanche (1819) was a 46-gun fifth rate launched in 1819. She was used as a receiving hulk at Portsmouth from 1852 until she was broken up in 1865.
- HMS Blanche (1867) was an Eclipse-class wooden screw sloop, launched in 1867 and sold in 1886.
- HMS Blanche (1889) was a Barracouta-class cruiser, launched in 1889 and sold in 1905.
- HMS Blanche (1909) was a Blonde-class scout cruiser launched in 1909 and sold in 1921.
- HMS Blanche (H47) was a B-class destroyer launched in 1930 and sunk in 1939.
