= Caroline (1804 ship) =

History

France
- Name: Caroline
- Builder: Solidor, Saint-Malo
- Laid down: June 1803
- Launched: January 1804
- Captured: 28 December 1808
- Fate: Sunk 14 January 1809

General characteristics
- Type: Corvette
- Displacement: 130 tons (French)
- Sail plan: Cutter (original); Brig (from August 1805)
- Crew: 17 officers and 76 men (February–May 1804); 119 men (July 1804-November 1804 and September 1805 to January 1806)
- Armament: 16 × 32-pounder carronades + 2 × 36-pounder obusiers de vaisseau

Caroline was a French privateer commissioned in Saint-Malo in 1804. She served in the Indian Ocean, based at Île de France (now Mauritius). As she was returning to Saint-Malo, a sloop of the British Royal Navy captured her off Cape Finisterre in 1809; she was accidentally sunk shortly thereafter.

== French service ==
Built at Solidor, near Saint-Malo, Caroline was commissioned by a joint venture between Robert Surcouf and his father-in-law Louis Blaize de Maisonneuve, Her captain was Nicolas Surcouf, Robert's brother.

Caroline departed Saint-Malo in February 1804, bound for Île de France (now Mauritius).

On 16 April Caroline was still to the west of Africa when Surcouf captured Whim. Five days later, Surcouf captured Unicorn (or Licorne in French), off St Helena as Unicorn was returning from the South Seas. (Note: Surcouf gave the name of Unicorn's master as James Porter. There is no vessel named Unicorn in either Lloyd's Register or the Register of Shipping with a master named James Porter. However, a Unicorn, Captain James Porter, had visited Tahiti between 4 and 11 April, and was taken by a French privateer on her way home. Some accounts give the name of Unicorn's master as Newton, but Mr. Newton was her supercargo. The most likely vessel in Lloyd's Register (1804) is Unicorn, of 149 tons, launched at Liverpool in 1798, H. Barber, master, R. Wigram, owner, and trade, London-Africa.) Surcouf plundered both vessels of their cargoes, transferred Unicorn's crew to Whim, and then released Whim, against a ransom of 4000 piastres.

A prize crew of 13 men under the command of Jean-Baptiste Graffin sailed Unicorn back to France. There she was sold for 6,200 piastres, and her two cargoes were sold for 8,898 piastres.

Caroline arrived at Île de France in May 1804. She cruised the Indian Ocean from July to November before returning to Île de France on 21 November. During this cruise she captured Mornington (14 August; 600 tons and 8 guns), Fame (13 October; 600 tons), and Stirling Castle (19 October; 800 tons and 8 guns). HMS Phaeton recaptured Mornington; however, Captain Fallonard of the brig Île de France recaptured Mornington yet again.

At Île de France Caroline was refitted and transformed into a brig. She went on a second campaign from September 1805 to January 1806. Caroline captured the ships Waldegrave and Commerce in the Indian Ocean, and Melville and Prince de Galles in the Gulf of Bengal, (Note: Gallois lists these ships with French names, probably translating from the English original.) teaming up with Perroud's Bellone and Henry's Henriette. Surcouf appears to have left Caroline after this voyage. When Caroline was paid off, her 117 officers and crew men shared a payment of 46,566.42 piastres, divided into 241 shares, representing one-third of the net value of the prizes she had taken. Nicholas Surcouf had 12 shares, Lacaze Ranly, her second captain, had 10 shares. The least was a half-share, which was the lot of the cabin boys and a couple of the officers' servants. Each seaman had from three-quarters of a share to 1½ shares.

In September 1808, Caroline departed Île de France, bound for Saint-Malo, under Joseph Guezenec.

== Fate ==
On 28 December 1808, the British sloop HMS Eclair was returning to Britain from Corunna when she encountered and captured Caroline north of Cape Finisterre. She brought Caroline, described as a "French Letter of Marque from the Isles of France to Bordeaux (with a valuable cargo)", to Plymouth, where however, on Saturday, 14 January 1809, she was run down in the Catwater and sunk.
