= Bellona (ship) =

Several ships have been named Bellona or Bellone for the Roman goddess Bellona:

- Bellona, originally True Briton (1775 ship), and previously John, had been launched in Liverpool in 1775. True Briton and John were slave ships, making three voyages in the triangular trade in enslaved people. In 1778–1779 Bellona had an unusually successful time as a privateer, capturing five prizes. She then returned to enslaving, making three more voyages transporting enslaved people. New owners renamed her Lord Stanley, and as Lord Stanley she made a further 11 voyages transporting enslaved people.
- Bellona (1782 ship) was a three-decker merchantman launched at Limehouse by Woolcombe for Boyd & Co. She then traded for a decade before, in 1792, commencing a series of four voyages for the British East India Company as an "extra ship", that is, on a charter contract. During the first of these voyages she transported convicts from Britain to New South Wales. French privateers captured her and the British Royal Navy recaptured her, the Royal Navy seized her once, and then finally a French privateer captured her in February 1810 and scuttled her.
- Bellona (1796 ship) was a three-decker merchantman launched at Calcutta. In 1799 she sailed to Great Britain and was admitted to the Registry of Great Britain in 1800. A French frigate captured her in 1801.
- Bellona (1799 ship) was launched at Lancaster. She was a West Indiaman that made one voyage as a whaler. She disappeared in 1809 as she was returning to England from Jamaica.
- Bellona (1804 ship) was built in Spain in 1797 and was taken in prize around late 1804. She made two voyages as a privateer, including one in which she sailed from Liverpool to the River Plate area. On her return, in a highly unusual gesture, her owners awarded her captain £100 despite his lack of success. Next, Bellona made a voyage as a slave ship. She was wrecked as she was coming back into Liverpool after having delivered to Charleston the captives she was carrying.
- Bellona (1812 ship) was launched at Whitby and was lost in 1814.
- SS Bellona (1862 ship), of 1,944 GRT, was a steam cargo ship built by Smith and Rodger at Govan. In 1889 she was renamed SS Benbrach. She wrecked on 25 January 1889.

== See also ==
- Bellona-class ship of the line
- French privateer Bellone
- French ship Bellone
- HMS Bellona
- USS Bellona
