= HMS Bellona =

Eight ships of the Royal Navy have borne the name HMS Bellona after Bellona, the goddess of war in Roman mythology:

- HMS Bellona (1747) was a 30-gun sixth rate, formerly the French privateer Bellone. She was captured in 1747, and sold in 1749.
- HMS Bellona (1760) was a 74-gun third rate, launched in 1760 and broken up in 1814.
- Bellona, possibly a hired armed vessel or armed ship, was lost at the mouth of the Elbe circa December 1779. She had been escorting a convoy from Hull to Hamburg. Several of the merchantmen in the convoy were lost too.
- HMS Bellona (1794) was a 3-gun vessel purchased in 1794. She was used as a mud boat from 1799 and was broken up in 1805.
- HMS Bellona (1806) was a 28-gun sixth rate, formerly the French privateer Bellone. She was captured in 1806, renamed HMS Blanche in 1809, and was broken up in 1814.
- HMS Bellona was a 74-gun third rate launched in 1812 as HMS Indus. She was renamed HMS Bellona in 1818, used for harbour service from 1840 and was broken up in 1868.
- HMS Bellona (1890) was a third-class cruiser launched in 1890 and sold in 1906.
- HMS Bellona (1909) was a Boadicea-class scout cruiser launched in 1909 and sold in 1921.
- HMS Bellona (63) was a modified Dido-class light cruiser launched in 1942, on loan to the Royal New Zealand Navy from 1948 to 1956, and broken up in 1959.

== See also ==
- Bellona (ship), several merchant vessels by that name
