= Henriette (1803 ship) =

History

France
- Name: Henriette
- Commissioned: 1803, Bordeaux
- Captured: June 1806

General characteristics
- Type: Corvette
- Displacement: 242 tons (French)
- Crew: 124 men
- Armament: 4 × 12-pounder carronades + 14 × 6-pounder & 2 × 9-pounder guns

Henriette was a French privateer commissioned in Bordeaux in late 1803. She served in the Bay of Biscay until mid-1804, and then in the Indian Ocean, based at Île de France (now Mauritius). The 74-gun HMS Powerful captured her in June 1806 off Ceylon.

== French service ==
Commissioned in late 1803 under Thomas Henry (or Henri), (Note: Henry was an ex-English privateer.) Henriette cruised in the Bay of Biscay until June 1804. She then crossed to Île de France, where she undertook three cruises, capturing several large British merchantmen.

Soon after his arrival at Île de France on 17 August, Henry left Port Louis on a cruise, only to have to return quickly, pursued by HMS Lancaster and HMS Phaeton.

Henry then embarked on 12 September on the first of two more successful cruises. Apparently some of Henriette's guns, two 12-pounder carronades, came from the East Indiaman Admiral Aplin, which the French privateer Psyche had captured in January.

On 12 October he captured Faza-Soubany (or Fazzy Soubani), of 500 tons (bm), Fryer, master, sailing from Bombay to Bengal.

Then on 26 October he captured Friendship. Friendship, of two guns and 380 tons, was carrying a cargo of rice, indigo, and cotton.

The next day Henry captured Sha Allum, of two guns and 380 tons (bm). She was carrying pepper, indigo, and cotton. Two days later he captured Marguerite, of two guns and 280 tons (bm). She was carrying sugar, indigo, and cotton.

On 12 November Henry captured James Sybald, of ten guns and 1,000 tons (bm); she had a cargo of rice. (James Sibald had been sailing from Bengal to Bombay. James Sybald resisted and during the course of this resistance Captain Henri received a wound from a "biscaïen", a type of large-caliber musket, that exposed his entrails. Henriette then returned to Port Louis on 10 December.)

Henry and Henriette left on their second cruise on 9 January 1805. On 3 February they captured the East Indiaman Coromandel. (Note: English records give the date of capture as 15 March 1805.) Coromandel was described as being of 450 tons and armed with fourteen 9-pounder guns.

In May 1806 Lloyd's List reported that the French privateers Bellone (under Jacques François Perroud), Henriette, and Caroline (under Nicolas Surcouf), had captured a number of merchantmen in the Bay of Bengal:

- Prince of Wales, from Sumatra to Bengal
- Mellville, Haig, master, from Bengal to Muscat
- Waldegrave, from China to Bengal
- Commerce, Dundas, master, from Sumatra to Bengal
- and Robust, Waters, master, and Phoenix, Gillespee, master, both from Bengal.

The privateers gave up Robust to their prisoners. She arrived at Bengal on 4 December 1805.

On 17 September 1805 Henry captured Viper, of eight guns and 12 swivel guns. Lloyd's List reported that "Henrietta" had captured "the East India Company's Brig the Viper" at 9°10′N 7°5′E. (Note: The reported longitude is clearly grossly in error as that would put the locus of capture within Nigeria.) A month later, on 13 November, Henriette captured Phoenix (possibly Phoenix), of 600 tons (bm). Henriette returned to Port Louis on 26 March 1806.

In April 1806, command of Henriette passed to Auguste Sagory. Henriette left Port Louis on 7 April, and on 6 May captured Dawetz-Nissaint on 6 May.

== Fate ==
On 13 June HMS Powerful captured Henriette off Trincomalee, Ceylon (now Sri Lanka). Powerful had received intelligence of her presence in the area and set out from Trincomalee on the 11th. Powerful sighted Henriette on the morning of the 13th. After an 11-hour chase, during which Henriette fired her stern guns at Powerful without effect, Powerful succeeded in catching up to her quarry, which surrendered without further combat. During the chase, Henriette's crew had thrown four of her 6-pounder guns overboard in an attempt to lighten her and so gain speed. Head money was paid for Henriette in January 1814.
