= Bellony =

Bellony may refer to:

- Vernice Bellony, Dominican politician and teacher
- Bellony Cave, a cave in Haiti

== See also ==
- Baloney (disambiguation)
- Bellamy (disambiguation)
- Bellona (disambiguation)
- Bellone
