= Robert Plampin =

British Royal Navy officer (1762–1834)

Vice-Admiral Robert Plampin
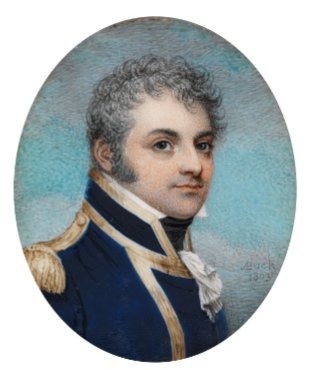
- Born: 1762; Chadacre Hall, Suffolk
- Died: 14 February 1834 (aged 71–72); Florence, Italy
- Military career
- Allegiance: United Kingdom
- Branch: Royal Navy
- Service years: 1775–1828
- Rank: Vice-Admiral
- Commands: Cape of Good Hope Station; Cork Station
- Conflicts: American Revolutionary War; Battle of Martinique; French Revolutionary Wars; Siege of Willemstad; Siege of Toulon; Napoleonic Wars; Capture of Bellone; Walcheren Campaign

Vice-Admiral Robert Plampin (1762 – 14 February 1834) was a British Royal Navy officer during the late 18th and early 19th centuries, serving in the American Revolutionary War, the French Revolutionary Wars and the Napoleonic Wars, but best known for his time as commander of the British colony of Saint Helena in the South Atlantic during the period when former Emperor Napoleon Bonaparte was imprisoned there. Born into a Navy family, Plampin went to sea at age 13 and fought throughout the American Revolutionary War, based principally in the Caribbean Sea. During the French Revolutionary Wars, Plampin served in a number of ships with mixed success, once being involved in a shipwreck and twice serving ashore during sieges. After the Peace of Amiens, Plampin took command of the ship of the line HMS Powerful and operated successfully in the Atlantic and the Indian Ocean. In 1816, following the defeat and capture of the French Emperor, Plampin was placed in command of the squadron at the Cape of Good Hope, which also had responsibility for Saint Helena, which Plampin regularly visited and had numerous conversations with Napoleon.

== Life ==
Plampin was born in 1762, the son of naval officer John Plampin of Chadacre Hall, in Suffolk. Intended for a career at sea, Plampin joined the Navy in 1775, aged 13, and served aboard HMS Renown under Captain Francis Banks off the coast of North America during the American Revolutionary War. In 1778, Plampin moved to HMS Panther at Gibraltar and subsequently moved in 1780 to HMS Sandwich, the flagship of Admiral Sir George Rodney. In Sandwich Plampin participated in the Battle of Martinique in April 1780, and subsequent operations, earning a promotion to lieutenant aboard HMS Grafton and returning to Britain. In 1781, he operated in HMS Leocadia off Newfoundland, remaining on the station for the remainder of the war.

Placed in reserve following the end of the war in 1783, Plampin traveled widely in Europe, making specific studies of the French language in 1786 and the Dutch language in 1787. At the Spanish Armament in 1790, Plampin became a lieutenant on the new ship of the line HMS Brunswick under Sir Hyde Parker. Parker was impressed by his subordinate's language skills and intelligence and, in 1793, suggested Plampin for a mission to the Netherlands, at that time allied to Britain in the French Revolutionary Wars. Plampin assumed command of a flotilla of gunboats based in the Dutch harbour of Willemstad, then under siege by a French army under General Charles François Dumouriez. When the French withdrew from Willemstad later in the year, Plampin was awarded a gold medal and chain by the Dutch government. Plampin subsequently became a lieutenant in HMS Princess Royal and sailed for the Mediterranean, joining the British fleet assisting the Royalist forces at the Siege of Toulon. Plampin became an interpreter for Rear-Admiral Samuel Goodall and then for Lord Hood until the end of the siege, when Plampin was promoted to commander and sent home with despatches.

=== Independent command ===
In August 1793, Plampin was given command of the hired armed sloop Albion, which he paid off on 11 September 1794, and then the floating battery Firm, operating off the Scheldt and the Dutch coast. In April 1795, he returned to the Mediterranean as a post captain in the sixth rate HMS Ariadne, acting as a scout for Captain Horatio Nelson at the Battle of Genoa and present but not engaged at the Battle of the Hyères Islands. In September 1795, Plampin took command of the frigate HMS Lowestoft, which was soon after struck by lightning and badly damaged. After repairs, Plampin returned to Britain where Lowestoft was paid off.

In November 1798, Lowestoft returned to service with Plampin in command for operations in the West Indies. After three years on convoy escort duty in the Caribbean, Lowestoft was wrecked in the Windward Passage with three merchant ships. As the frigate was carrying a large quantity of specie, Plampin summoned the small ship HMS Bonetta and successfully transferred the money and all of the frigates crew into the tiny vessel. For saving the specie, Plampin was paid the reward he had originally been promised for bringing it safely to Britain and was subsequently cleared of any wrongdoing in the loss of his ship.

After the outbreak of the Napoleonic Wars in 1803, Plampin was briefly given command of HMS Antelope before moving to the ship of the line HMS Powerful attached to the Channel Fleet. In the autumn of 1805, he was sent to Cádiz to join the squadron under Sir John Thomas Duckworth that was observing the remains of the Franco-Spanish fleet destroyed at the Battle of Trafalgar in the autumn. In November, Duckworth received accounts of a French squadron raiding off North Africa and sailed to investigate. Although the squadron he pursued escaped, Duckworth did encounter another force under Jean-Baptiste Willaumez on 25 December. Although he pursued the French for two days, Duckworth could not bring Willaumez to battle and eventually gave up the pursuit, ordering his squadron to sail for the Caribbean (where they later encountered another French squadron at the Battle of San Domingo), but detaching Plampin to the Indian Ocean in case Willaumez was intending to raid there.

Arriving in the Indian Ocean, Plampin found no sign of Willaumez (who had remained in the Atlantic), but did discover that British trade was under constant attack from French frigates and privateers based on Île de France, which particularly targeted the large East Indiamen. On 13 June 1806, Plampin captured the small privateer Henrietta off Trincomalee, but was especially concerned by the depredations of the large privateer frigate Bellone, which carried 34 guns. Disguising Powerful as an East Indiaman, Plampin cruised off Ceylon in search of the enemy and on 9 July discovered Bellone under pursuit by the Royal Navy sloop HMS Rattlesnake. Moving to cut Bellone off, Powerful was hampered by light winds and Bellone almost slipped between Plampin's ship and shore. However, the breeze gradually increased and Plampin was able to close with the privateer. The French ship defended itself and a running fight began that lasted for 105 minutes before Bellone surrendered, having caused greater casualties on Powerful than had been suffered herself.

=== Napoleon's gaoler ===
After a brief voyage to Java, disease spread aboard Powerful and Plampin himself was taken ill, returning to Britain to recuperate. Rejoining the service in 1809, Plampin commanded HMS Courageux at the disastrous Walcheren Expedition and in 1810 commanded the squadron at Basque Roads near Brest in HMS Gibraltar. In 1812, he commanded the 98-gun HMS Ocean off Toulon and in 1814 was promoted to rear-admiral. In 1816, following the end of the wars, Plampin was appointed commander at the Cape of Good Hope Station. Part of Plampin's duties was to observe the former French Emperor Napoleon Bonaparte, who was kept prisoner in a house on the island of Saint Helena, deep in the Atlantic Ocean. Plampin regularly visited his prisoner and the two had a number of conversations that were recorded by the naval historian James Ralfe.

=== Later life and death ===
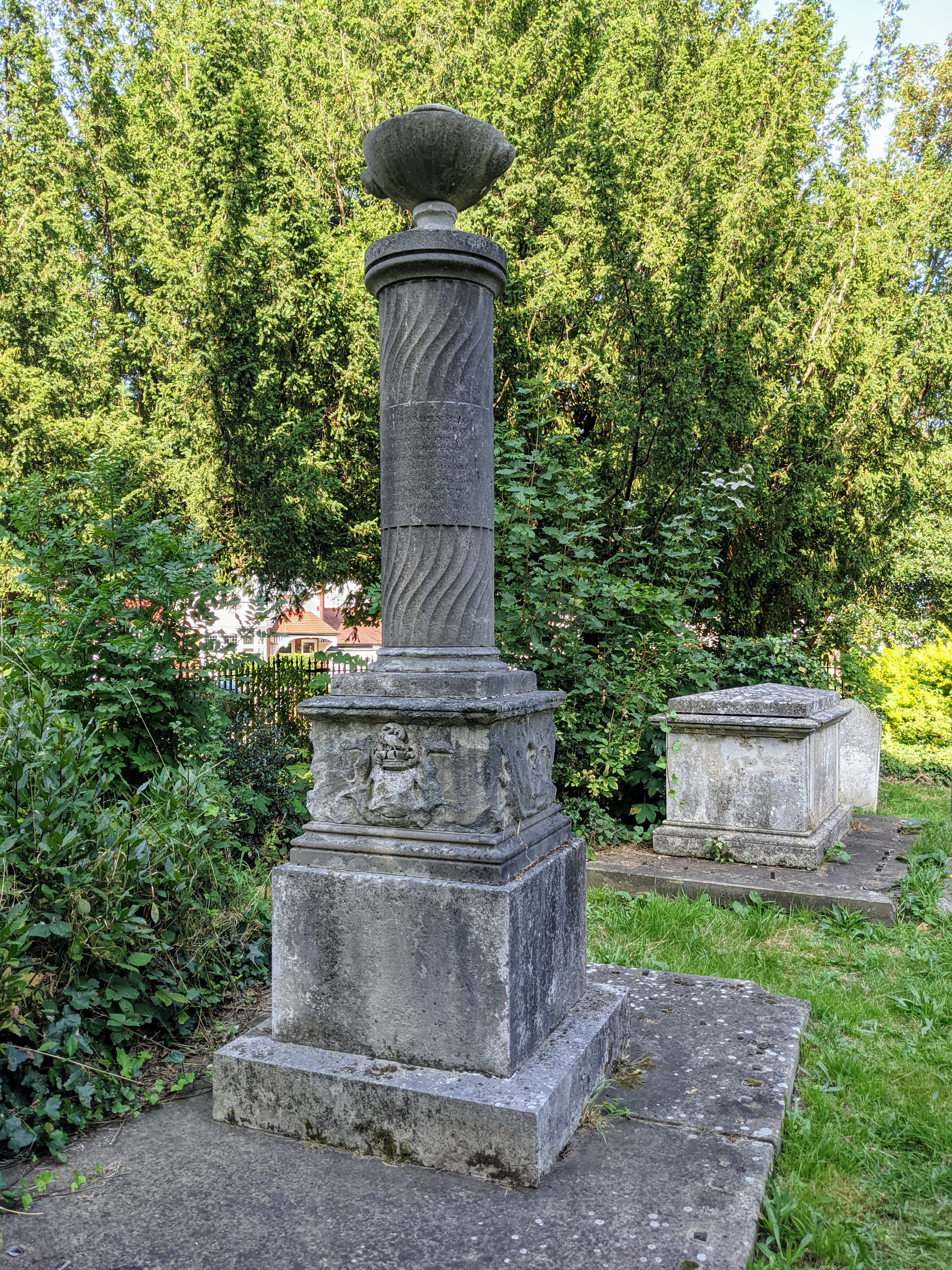
Plampin's tomb in the churchyard of St Mary the Virgin, Wanstead

On his return to Britain in September 1820, Plampin applied to become a Knight Commander of the Order of the Bath, but was informed by Lord Melville that such awards could only be made for service in the face of the enemy. Melville did however praise Plampin's war record in his reply. In 1825, Plampin was again recalled to service, commanding the Irish squadron based at Cork, until 1828, by which time he was a vice-admiral. He retired to his country home near Wanstead and managed his estates in Essex. He also travelled in Europe and it was on one such journey, in February 1834, that Plampin died in Florence. His remains were brought back to England and buried at St Mary the Virgin, Wanstead. He was survived by his wife Fanny, who died in 1864, but the couple had no children.

== Notes ==
Military offices
Preceded by George Cockburn	Commander-in-Chief, Cape of Good Hope Station; 1816–1820	Succeeded by Robert Lambert
Preceded by Lord Colville	Commander-in-Chief, Cork Station; 1825–1828	Succeeded by Charles Paget
