= Stirling Castle (1801 ship) =

United Kingdom
- Name: Stirling Castle
- Namesake: Stirling Castle
- Owner: Downie & Maitland or Palmer
- Builder: Calcutta
- Launched: 1801
- Captured: 1804
- Fate: Subsequently lost after October 1805.

General characteristics
- Tons burthen: 703, or 705, or 952 (bm)
- Notes: Teak-built three-decker

Stirling Castle was built at Calcutta in 1801. She made one voyage from Calcutta to England for the British East India Company (EIC).

EIC voyage (1801-1802): Captain James Honeyman (or Honiman) sailed from Calcutta on 31 December 1801, bound for England. Stirling Castle was at Kedgeree on 8 January 1802 and Saugor on 25 January. She reached Saint Helena on 4 May and by 13 July was off Spithead.

Fate: The French privateer Caroline, Captain Nicholas Surcouf, captured Stirling Castle in the Bay of Bengal on 19 October 1804 while Stirling Castle was on passage from Calcutta to Colombo, with a cargo of rice.

Surcouf put a prize crew on board consisting of his brother Charles Surcouf, and 15 crew members, all under the command of Antoine Lacazerauly. They sailed Stirling Castle to Mauritius, arriving on 5 November. There she was sold for 14,350 piastres, and her cargo for 44,559.

On 17 October 1805, Nicholas Surcouf and Caroline again encountered Sterling Castle. She had been sold at Port Louis to the Sultan of Muscat. Surcouf released her.

Stirling Castle was later lost.
