= Whim (1799 schooner) =

1799 schooner of the British East India Company

History

British East India Company
- Name: Whim
- Owner: British East India Company (EIC)
- Builder: Francis Barnard, Son & Roberts, Deptford
- Launched: 23 January 1799
- Fate: Sold 1802

United Kingdom
- Name: Whim
- Owner: 1802:T. Smith & Partners; 1806: Various
- Fate: No longer listed in Lloyd's Register after 1822

General characteristics
- Tons burthen: 90, 100, 109, 10990/94 (bm)
- Sail plan: Schooner
- Complement: 1799:15; 1801:15
- Armament: 1799: 10 × 4-pounder guns; 1800: 10 × 14-pounder guns; 1806: 4 guns; 1807: 10 × 6-pounder guns (NC; of the new construction); 1816: No longer armed

The British East India Company (EIC) had Whim built for use as a fast dispatch vessel. She was sold in 1802 and became a whaler that a French privateer captured and released, and then a merchant vessel. She is no longer listed after 1822.

== Career ==
Whim was launched by Francis Barnard, Son & Roberts at Deptford on 23 January 1799, "under the particular inspection of the late Robert Charnock Esq. for his private use, copper fastened and coppered, the beams iron kneed." Captain John Ramsden received a letter of marque for Whim on 9 May 1799. He then sailed her to India.

On 15 November 1800 Captain Andrew Barclay received a letter of marque. On 23 November she sailed for Madras, leaving Spithead on 7 December. She arrived at Madras on 16 April 1801. She left Madras for Britain on 6 August and under the command of Captain John H. Fellers, and arrived at The Downs on 25 November. The EIC advertised the sale on 8 January 1802 of rice brought by its ships, including Whim.

In 1802 the EIC sold Whim to Captain T. Smith & Partners as the EIC no longer required her. Lloyd's Register for 1802 showed her master changing from "Tellfer" to J. Smith, and her trade becoming London-Cape of Good Hope.

Whim sailed on 24 October 1802. Lloyd's Register for 1803 now gave her trade as London-South Georgia, consistent with her leaving on a whaling voyage. In December, Whim stopped at Rio de Janeiro for water and provisions.

On 16 April 1804 the French privateer Nicholas Surcouf, in Caroline, was on his way to Île de France when he captured Whim. (Note: Surcouf gave the name of Whim's master as Fraser Smith. Caroline was armed with sixteen 32-pounder carronades and two 36-pounder obusiers de vaisseau.) Five days later, Surcouf captured Unicorn off St Helena as Unicorn was returning from the South Seas. (Note: Surcouf gave the name of Unicorn's master as James Porter. There is no vessel named Unicorn in either Lloyd's Register or the Register of Shipping with a master named James Porter. However, a Unicorn, Captain James Porter, had visited Tahiti between 4 and 11 April, and was taken by a French privateer on her way home. Some accounts give the name of Unicorn's master as Newton, but Mr. Newton was her supercargo. The most likely vessel in Lloyd's Register (1804) is Unicorn, of 149 tons, launched at Liverpool in 1798, H. Barber, master, R. Wigram, owner, and trade, London-Africa.) Surcouf plundered both vessels of their cargoes, transferred Unicorn's crew to Whim, and then released Whim, against a ransom of 4000 piastres. Whim's lost cargo consisted of 6000 seal skins and eight barrels of elephant seal oil. Whim sailed to St Helena where she was reported in May, and she returned to Britain on 15 July. (Note: The mention in the University of Hull's database inverts the story, crediting Whim with capturing Surcouf and recapturing Unicorn, and then releasing Surcouf.)

By April 1805 Whim was lying moored off Horsleydown in the Pool of London and for sale by auction on 10 April at Lloyd's Coffee House in Cornhill. She failed to sell at auction and continued to be offered for sale until at least October that year.

Although Lloyd's Register carries Whim as whaling at South Georgia into 1806, there is no evidence of her making any other whaling voyages. (Note: One source has her ownership changing to Hurry & Co. for the slave trade. However, the most comprehensive database of Trans Atlantic slave trade voyages does not show any voyages by a Whim post-1796.) Lloyd's Register for 1806 shows a change of master and ownership, but both are illegible. Whim, Forbes, master, was reported to have arrived at Dover in September 1806, having sailed with a fleet from Gibraltar on 24 August after having departed Algiers. She separated from the fleet on 12 September.

Lloyd's Register for 1807 shows the new master as Forbes, A. Dalziel as owner, and a trade of London-Algiers. In subsequent years masters change, with Dalziel being master in 1811. In 1812 ownership changes to Bold & Co., with J. Portis, master, and trade Liverpool-Africa.

Whim was reported to have been at "Princes" around the end of 1818. She had been plundered and lost a boat and four hands at Benin Bar.

Masters changed, but from 1819 on, Lloyd's Register shows Whim at Plymouth with Bold & Co. as owners, and S. Grillan as master. Whim is last listed in 1822.
