= French ship Bellone =

Eleven ships of the French Navy have borne the name Bellone, in honour of Bellona:

- Bellone (1690–1696), a galley
- Bellone (1696–1719), a 32-gun frigate
- Bellone (1745–1749), a 30-gun frigate
- Bellone (1758–1777), a 32-gun frigate
- Bellone (1779–1806), a 32-gun Iphigénie-class frigate
- Bellone (1797–1797), a xebec
- Bellone (1807–1817), a 44-gun frigate
- Bellone (1808), a ship of unknown type
- Bellone (1814–1840), a 44-gun Hortense-class frigate
- Bellone (1853–1877), a 38-gun frigate
- Bellone (Q102, 1917–1935), the lead ship of the Bellone class of submarines

== Privateers ==
Several French privateers also bore the name.

- Bellone, involved in a naval battle in Loch nan Uamh during the Jacobite rising. She was captured in 1747 and taken into Royal Navy service as HMS Bellona and was sold in 1749.
- Bellone, of 34-guns under Jacques François Perroud , which captured the East Indiaman Lord Nelson on 14 August 1803. A painting by Auguste Mayer commemorates the action.
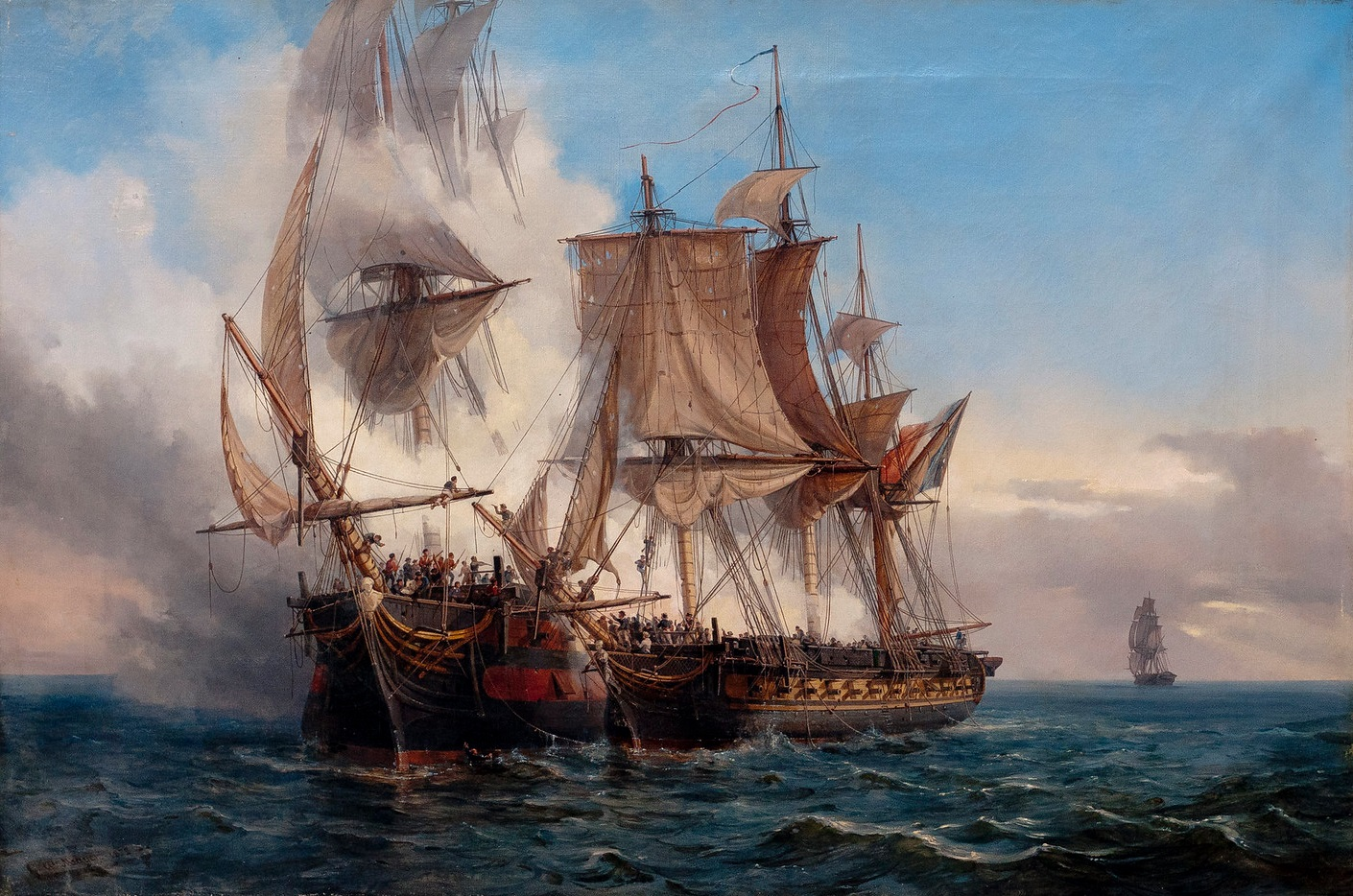
Capture of Lord Nelson by Bellone

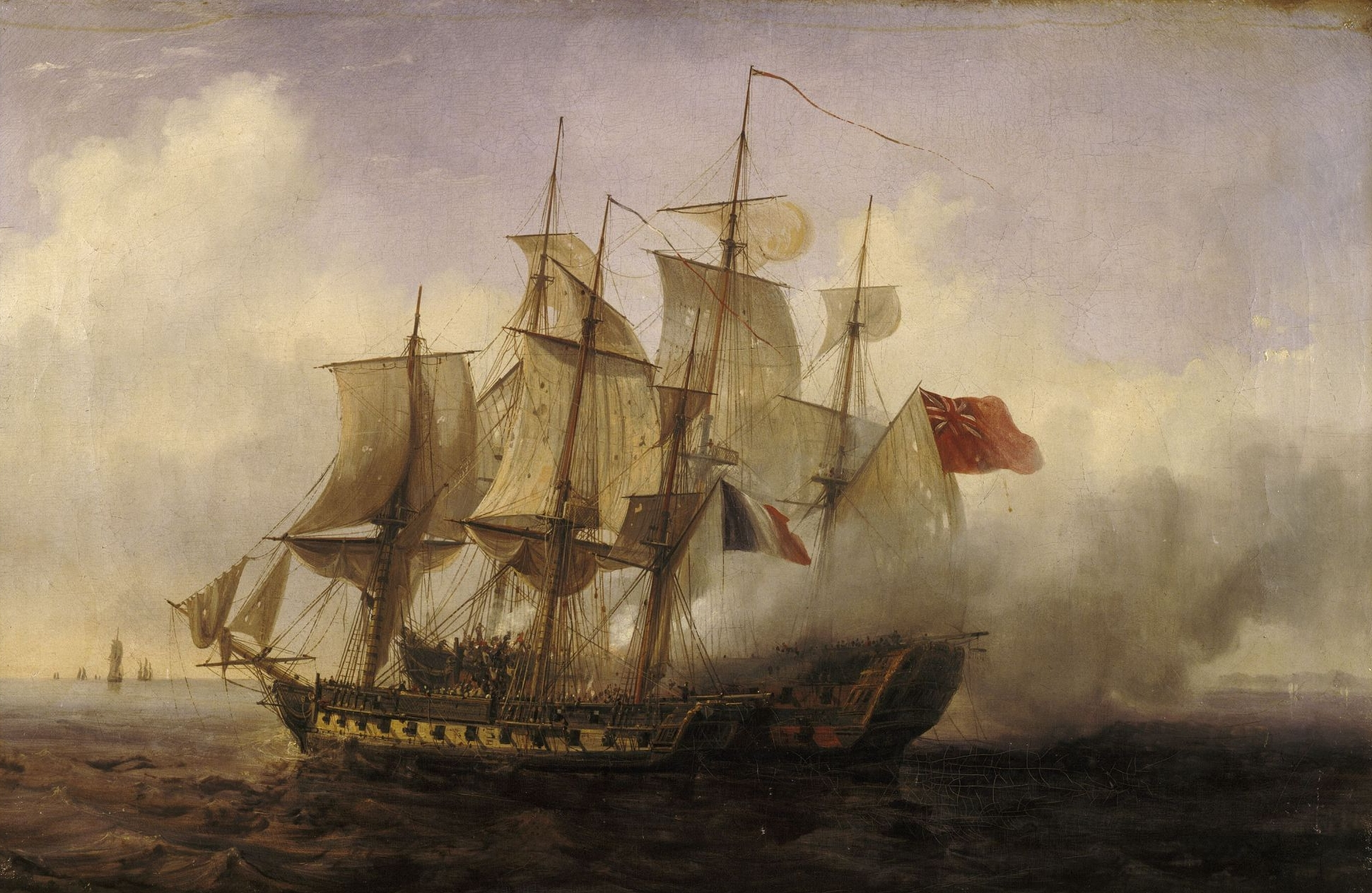
Painting by Auguste Mayer

== Merchant Vessels ==
- Bellone (1714?-1725), a ship of the French East India Company. The ship sank off Dauphin Island near Mobile in 1725.
