= Bellona =

Bellona may refer to:

== Places ==
- Bellona, Campania, a comune in the Province of Caserta, Italy
- Bellona Reef, a reef in New Caledonia
- Bellona Island, an island in Rennell and Bellona Province, Solomon Islands
- Bellona, New York, a hamlet in Yates County, New York, USA

== Ships ==
- HMS Bellona (1760), a 74-gun third rate
- Bellona (1782 ship), a merchant vessel for the British East India Company
- HMS Bellona (1806), a 28-gun sixth rate, formerly the French privateer Bellone
- HMS Bellona (1909), a Boadicea-class scout cruiser
- HMS Bellona (63), a modified Dido-class light cruiser launched in 1942
- Bellona, a French ship captured in 1759 by Samuel Hood, 1st Viscount Hood
- Bellona, a Swedish class of frigates and a ship designed by Fredrik Henrik af Chapman in the late 18th century

== Other uses ==
- Bellona (goddess), a Roman goddess of war
- 28 Bellona, an asteroid
- Bellona Foundation, a Norwegian environmental organisation
- Bellona Publishing House, a Polish publishing house
- Bellona, a fictional city in Samuel R. Delany's novel Dhalgren
- Bellona Arsenal, a 19th-century United States Army and Confederate arsenal in Virginia, U.S.
- Bellona Foundry, a 19th-century United States Army and Confederate foundry in Virginia, U.S.

== See also ==
- B'Elanna, a character in Star Trek: Voyager
- HMS Bellona, a name held by eight ships of the Royal Navy
