= Adèle (1800 brig) =

History

France
- Name: Adèle
- Builder: Nantes
- Commissioned: May 1800
- Fate: Captured 13 November 1800

British East India Company
- Name: Waller
- Namesake: Captain William Waller
- Operator: East India Company (EIC), 1801-1804
- Acquired: 1801 by purchase post-capture
- Fate: Sold August 1804

United Kingdom
- Name: HMS Firebrand
- Acquired: 1804 by purchase
- Fate: Wrecked 13 October 1804

General characteristics
- Displacement: 120-140 tons (French)
- Tons burthen: 140 (bm)
- Length: 80 ft 2 in (24.4 m) (overall); c.
- Sail plan: Brig
- Complement: 60 (Adèle)
- Armament: 10 guns (Adèle); 10 × 4-pounder + 2 × 6-pounder guns (Adèle)

Adèle was a French privateer brig commissioned in 1800 that the British Royal Navy captured later that year. The British East India Company's government in India purchased her in 1801 for service as an armed brig in the Bay of Bengal and along the Coromandel Coast. In 1804 she sailed to Britain where the Admiralty purchased her for use as a fire ship, and named her HMS Firebrand. She was wrecked in 1804.

== History ==
=== Adèle ===
In May 1800, Nicholas Surcouf commissioned Adèle. She was described as a "beautiful little vessel (….) recently fitted out at Nantz, well found, and in every respect qualified for the service she was intended to perform".

Adèle sailed from Mauritius on the evening of 25 August, in company with the privateer Gloire.

Adèle and Surcouf captured eight small prizes, four of which he permitted to go on their way after Surcouf had plundered them of what he had thought necessary. However, on 13 November 1800 he encountered a British brig-sloop man-of-war.

=== Capture ===
HMS Albatross, Captain William Waller, captured Adèle (or Adel) at 18°N 91°E. Adèle was armed with 10 guns and had a crew of 60 men.

Albatross had left Bombay and near the Point de Galle encountered a Danish vessel that informed him that the French privateers Confiance and Malartic were in the Bay of Bengal preying on British commerce. Waller therefore sailed north to attempt to find them.

At about 00:45 hours on 13 November 1800, Albatross was well into the Bay of Bengal when she encountered a strange vessel. The size and behavior of the strange vessel suggested that she might be Malartic; however, she might also be HMS Mongoose. As the strange vessel approached Albatross cleared for action. The stranger fired two shots and when asked if she was Mongoose, replied, "French privateer Adèle. Heave to and send your boat on board." Albatross immediately fired a broadside that Adèle returned. The two vessels exchanged fire at close range for about half an hour until Adèle attempted to board. Albatross repelled the attempt and Adèle, now aware that she was not dealing with a merchant vessel, started to flee. Albatross gave chase and within another half an hour, caught up. The two vessels exchanged broadsides with the muzzles of their cannon touching when Adèle struck, and a British boarding party took possession of her.

Adèle had lost six men killed and 13 wounded. Albatross had lost one marine and one seaman (from HMS Braave) killed, and six men wounded (one of whom belonged to Braave and one to HMS Centurion). Surcouf surrendered to Waller and offered him his sword, which Waller, as a sign of respect, declined to take.

Albatross had captured Adèle some 90 leagues south of the Sandheads (at the mouth of the Ganges River). Adèle arrived at Kedgeree on 25 November.

Waller and Albatross went on to capture Gloire on 23 March 1801. The Madras Insurance Company presented Waller with an honour sword and a piece of plate (each worth £200) as a reward for the service he had rendered by this capture and that of Adèle.

=== Waller ===
General Sir Arthur Wellesley acquired Adèle on behalf of the EIC, named her Waller, and sent her to Trincomalee with dispatches.

Lieutenant Alexander Davidson, of the Royal Navy, became Waller's commander. He was already her commander in December 1800. Then on 21 January 1801 he wrote a letter to Wellesley asking for permission to purchase four guns from the transport Eliza to complete her armament. Wellesley arranged for their purchase.

Later that year Waller supported General David Baird's expedition to co-operate with Ralph Abercromby in the expulsion of the French from Egypt. She accompanied Baird to Kosseir. Baird landed there and led his army across the desert to Kena on the Nile, and then to Cairo.

In 1803 Davidson sailed Waller from Malacca to Amboyna and back, and then on to Madras. As he did so he took many sightings to facilitate navigation.

Lastly, the EIC employed Waller to take a cargo to Britain. Still under Davidson's command, she left Calcutta on 9 January 1804 and arrived at London in April.

=== HMS Firebrand ===
The Admiralty purchased Waller in August and converted her into a fire ship under the name HMS Firebrand. She was at Woolwich between 20 August and 11 September undergoing fitting out. Lieutenant William MacLean commissioned her in August. She was to undergo further fitting out between 17 October and 15 December, but fate intervened.

== Loss ==
Firebrand was in the Downs on 13 October when she weighed and sailed for Dover. Visibility was bad during the night and as she did not have a pilot aboard it is possible that she mistook some lights ashore for boats at anchor and the Dover pier. Shortly before midnight she grounded and started to take on water. A local pilot came out and tried to get her off, but her back was broken and water was coming in too fast for the pumps. Her crew took to their boats and there were no deaths. Lieutenant MacLean spent some time in the cold water before he was rescued; he died three weeks after his rescue, perhaps as a consequence.
