= Action of 9 July 1806 =

Minor naval engagement during the French Revolutionary Wars

Coordinates: 6°28′N 81°43′E

- Part of the Napoleonic Wars
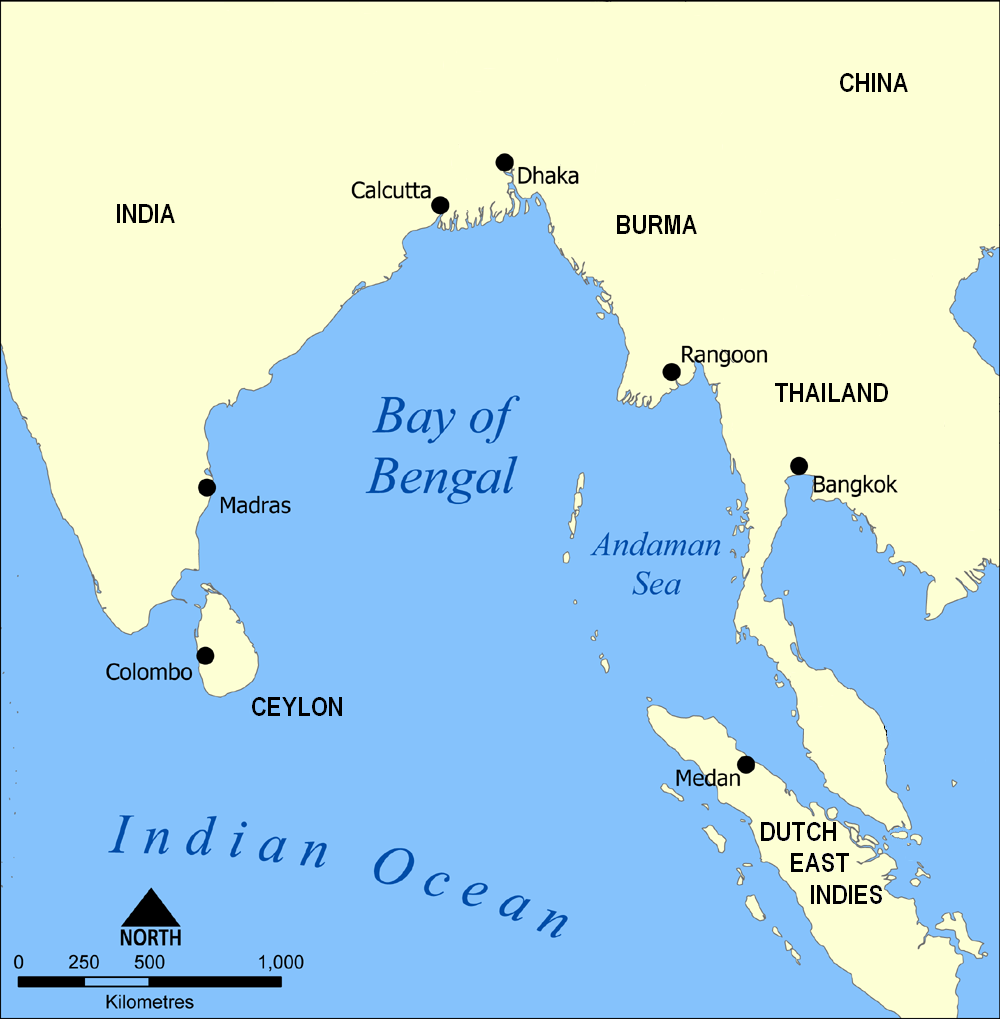
- Location of the capture of Bellone
Date	9 July 1806
Location	Little Basses Reef, off the Southern coast of Ceylon
Result	British victory

Belligerents
United Kingdom	France

Commanders and leaders
Captain Robert Plampin	Captain Jacques Perroud

Strength
Ship of the line HMS Powerful and brig HMS Rattlesnake	Privateer frigate Bellone

Casualties and losses
2 killed, 11 wounded	1 killed, 6–7 wounded, Bellone captured

The action of 9 July 1806 was a minor engagement between a French privateer frigate and British forces off Southern Ceylon during the Napoleonic Wars. French privateers operating from the Indian Ocean islands of Île Bonaparte and Île de France were a serious threat to British trade across the Indian Ocean during the Wars, and the British deployed numerous methods of intercepting them, including disguising warships as merchant vessels to lure privateers into unequal engagements with more powerful warships. Cruising near the Little Basses Reef on the Southern coast of Ceylon, the 34-gun privateer Bellone was sighted by the 16-gun British brig HMS Rattlesnake, which began chasing the larger French vessel. At 15:15, a third ship was sighted to the south, which proved to be the 74-gun ship of the line HMS Powerful, disguised as an East Indiaman.

Although Bellone would normally be much faster than the large British warship, the light winds and Rattlesnake's determined pursuit prevented the privateer from escaping and at 17:00, Powerful was close enough to open fire. Despite the uneven nature of the combat, Bellone unexpectedly resisted the British attack for another hour and 45 minutes, causing more damage to Powerful than she received herself. The privateer was later taken into British service as a sixth rate frigate and prize money was paid for the captured vessels, but the action prompted questions in subsequent histories about the lack of efficiency in British gunnery.

== Background ==
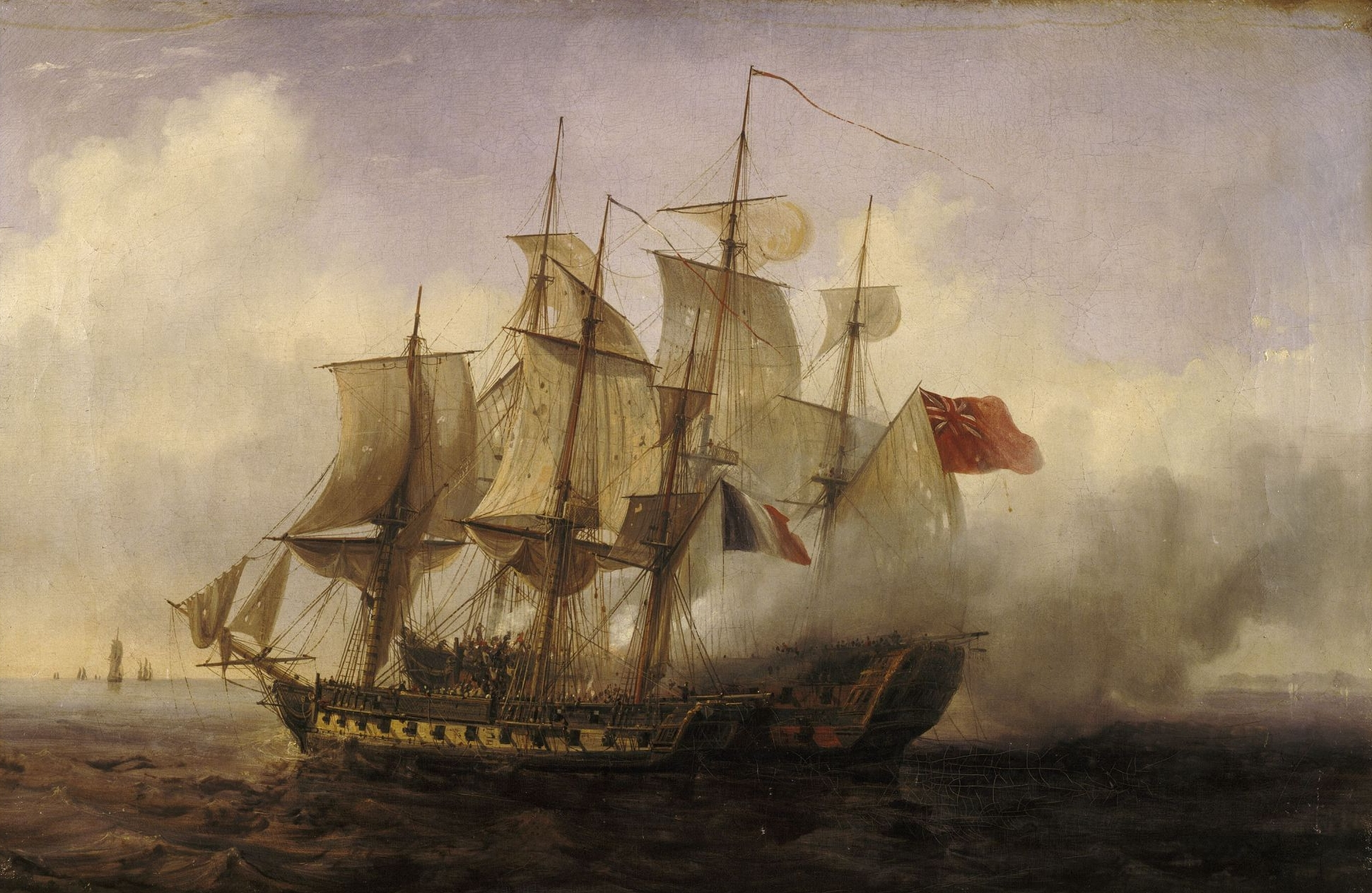
Bellone capturing the East Indiaman Lord Nelson on 14 August 1803.

During the French Revolutionary Wars and the Napoleonic Wars that followed them, British dominance in the Indian Ocean was repeatedly challenged by the depredations of French vessels sailing from the isolated and well protected French colonies of Réunion (later Île Bonaparte) and Île de France. Although French Navy cruisers were periodically stationed on the islands, the majority of ships that preyed on British commerce from the islands were privateers, independently funded armed ships issued with letters of marque giving them permission to attack military and civilian ships belonging to the enemies of France. French naval strategy in the Indian Ocean was so reliant on privateers that entire squadrons developed, including a powerful force under the wealthy privateer captain Robert Surcouf. Although most privateers were small, carrying only a few cannon, some could be very large, rivalling professional warships in size. One such ship was the Bellone, which carried 34 guns, a crew of nearly 200 men and was commanded by Captain Jacques François Perroud, a notorious privateer who had caused significant damage to British trade in the Indian Ocean. In 1803, Perroud had gained significant notoriety with the capture of the valuable East Indiaman Lord Nelson on 14 August 1803.

The principal target of the privateers were the East Indiamen, huge and well-armed merchant vessels operated by the Honourable East India Company, which controlled British mercantile operations to the east of Africa. These ships often weighed over 1,000 tons and carried as many as 30 cannon, although their crews were not military men and they could not usually resist a determined attack by a well-trained warship. Despite the size and power of these vessels, they were a primary target for French ships operating in the Indian Ocean as they often carried goods worth thousands of pounds: the annual convoy from China alone was worth over $8 million in 1804. To combat these ships, the British naval authorities at Madras tried a number of solutions, including blockades of the French island colonies which failed due to the huge distances involved, armed military convoys escorting the most valuable ships and small fast cruisers patrolling the most dangerous trade routes. One solution tried in 1806 was to disguise Royal Navy warships as the East Indiamen they superficially resembled in the hope of luring French ships into attacking them, unaware of their true identity.

In December 1805, two French squadrons departed Brest under orders to disrupt British trade in the Atlantic Ocean, beginning the Atlantic campaign of 1806. Several British squadrons were despatched in pursuit, including one under Vice-Admiral Sir John Thomas Duckworth originally assigned to blockade Cádiz. On 25 December, Duckworth discovered one of the French squadrons, under Vice-Admiral Jean-Baptiste Philibert Willaumez, in the mid-Atlantic and gave chase. For the next two days the squadrons sailed westwards across the Atlantic, until Duckworth abandoned the pursuit, believing that his dispersed squadron was in danger of piecemeal defeat by Willaumez's force. In the aftermath of the pursuit, Willaumez turned towards the South Atlantic while Duckworth, in urgent need of supplies, turned northwest towards the British West Indies. Duckworth was concerned that Willaumez might attempt to pass the Cape of Good Hope and operate in the Indian Ocean, and so despatched one of his ships to augment Rear-Admiral Sir Edward Pellew's small squadron at Madras. This ship was HMS Powerful, a 74-gun ship of the line commanded by Captain Robert Plampin.

== Battle ==
On 9 July 1806, the small British brig HMS Rattlesnake under Commander John Bastard was cruising off the Southern coast of the British colony of Ceylon in search of French privateers that had been attacking small British traders, known as country ships, in the region. Most notorious of these was the Bellone, known to be operating in the area. In the early afternoon, lookouts on Rattlesnake spotted sails near the Little Basses Reef and approached the ship, which turned with the wind and fled to the southwest. Bastard immediately gave chase, and soon came close enough to identify the vessel as the Bellone. Although Bellone was much larger than the British warship, Captain Perroud was unwilling to risk his vessel in an unprofitable confrontation with Rattlesnake and seemed to be making an effective withdrawal when, at 15:15, a large ship came within sight directly ahead.

Although it was not immediately obvious to the men on Bellone, the new arrival was Plampin's Powerful, which had arrived in Indian waters on 13 June 1806. Finding no trace of Willaumez, who had elected to remain in the Atlantic, Plampin briefly anchored at Madras and subsequently cruised off Ceylon. There, following intelligence sent by Pellew, he captured the 20-gun French privateer Henriette near Trincomalee after an 11-hour chase. From information possibly supplied by prisoners removed from Henriette or possibly from a merchant ship sailing from Colombo, Plampin learned of Perroud's operations and had arranged to meet Rattlesnake off the Little Basses Reef. In the hope of luring the privateer into a confrontation, he disguised his large warship to look like an East Indiaman. Perroud rapidly saw through the disguise, and also noticed that while the wind remained strong off the coast, Powerful was further out to sea and appeared becalmed. Realising that his only option was to sail between Powerful and the shore, Perroud turned eastwards, but the wind gradually strengthened for Powerful and by 17:00 the ship of the line was within range of Bellone with her bow chasers.

Although faced with overwhelming opposition, Perroud did not surrender, maintaining a steady cannonade on the approaching ship of the line with Bellone's own stern chasers and occasionally turning to release a full broadside. The variable winds prevented Rattlesnake joining the battle and also delayed Powerful's approach; Bellone succeeded in causing casualties on Plampin's deck but failed to damage the ship of the line's rigging or sails, which would have facilitated her own escape. For an hour and 45 minutes the battle continued with neither ship able to land a decisive blow on the other, until, at 18:45, it was clear that Powerful would soon be within range with her main broadside. Perroud surrendered rather than see his ship destroyed.

== Aftermath ==
Although the defeat of Bellone by such an overwhelming force of professional warships would seem inevitable, the resistance given by the French privateer was considered impressive both at the time and by subsequent historians. Although largely undamaged, Powerful had suffered two men killed and 11 wounded, compared to French losses of one dead and six or seven wounded. Bellone was also largely undamaged, only surrendering when Powerful was in position to open a full broadside. After the battle, Bellone was taken into port and subsequently commissioned as HMS Blanche albeit with a reduction in class to a 28-gun sixth rate frigate. Head-money, a reward for the men captured or killed aboard enemy ships, was subsequently paid to the men of Powerful and Rattlesnake, as was head money for Henriette, although in both cases there was a delay in payment until January 1814. Pellew especially was delighted by the capture of Bellone, writing "I reflect with much pleasure on the capture of La Bellone in particular, as from her superior sailing, as her uncommon success in the present and preceding war against the commerce, in the Indian and European seas".

Historical reaction to the engagement has focused on two aspects: Perroud's bravery in attempting to combat a vastly superior British force and the inaccuracy of Plampin's gunnery. Contemporary historian William James described Perroud's actions as "extraordinary" and notes that this was the second engagement in the Indian Ocean during 1806 in which British gunnery had proven ineffective, citing an inconclusive engagement on 21 April in which the 74-gun HMS Tremendous had been outgunned by the French frigate Canonnière, the frigate escaping pursuit by damaging the larger vessel's rigging. He also notes that Powerful was able to bring six guns into regular use during the engagement as opposed to Bellone's four, concluding that Plampin "might have made a better use of [the extra cannon]". Later historian William Laird Clowes, writing in 1900, agreed with James' assessment, commenting that "This action serves to again illustrate the lamentable decline in British gunnery".

== Bibliography ==
- Clowes, William Laird (1997) [1900]. The Royal Navy, A History from the Earliest Times to 1900, Volume V. Chatham Publishing. ISBN 1-86176-014-0.
- Gardiner, Robert, ed. (2001) [1998]. The Campaign of Trafalgar. Caxton Editions. ISBN 1-84067-358-3.
- Gardiner, Robert, ed. (2001) [1998]. The Victory of Seapower. Caxton Editions. ISBN 1-84067-359-1.
- James, William (2002) [1827]. The Naval History of Great Britain, Volume 4, 1805–1807. Conway Maritime Press. ISBN 0-85177-908-5.
