= HMS Albatross (1795) =

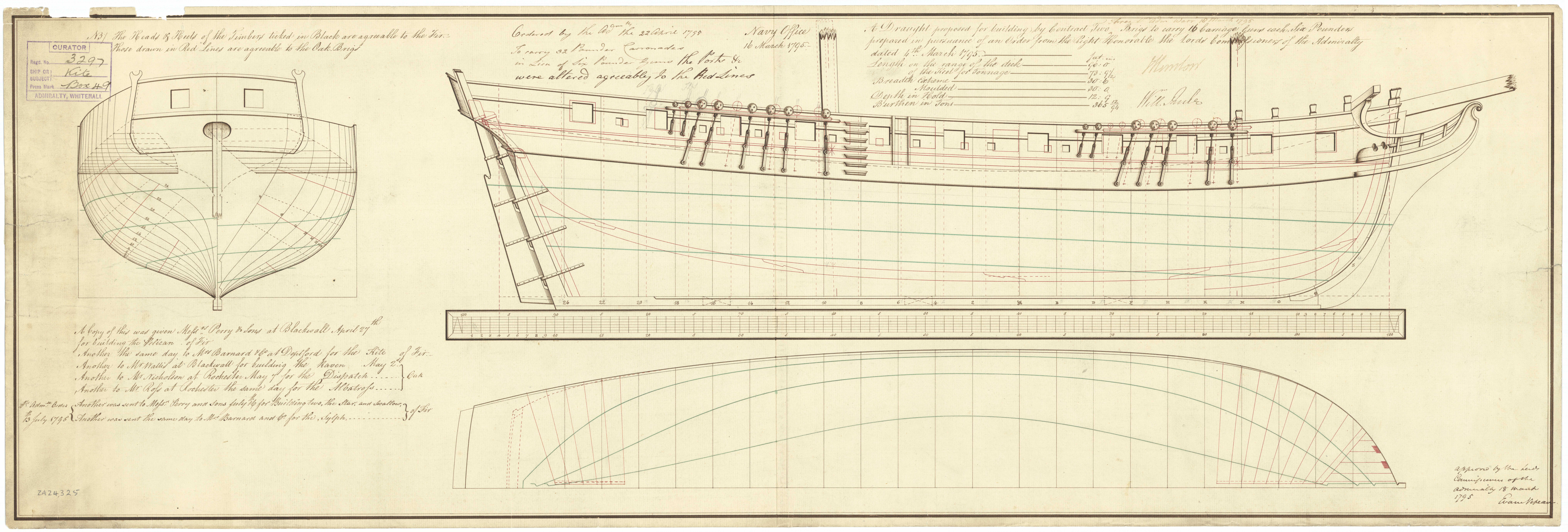
- Drawing showing the body plan with stern board outline, sheer lines with scroll figurehead, and longitudinal half-breadth used to build Albatross and the other ships of her class

History

Great Britain
- Name: HMS Albatross
- Ordered: 18 March 1795
- Builder: Charles Ross, Rochester
- Laid down: May 1795
- Launched: 30 December 1795
- Commissioned: January 1796
- Fate: Broken up in 1810

General characteristics
- Class & type: Albatross-class brig-sloop
- Tons burthen: 36638/94 (bm)
- Length: Overall: 96 ft 0 in (29.3 m); Keel: 73 ft 7 3/4 in (22.4 m)
- Beam: 30 ft 7 in (9.3 m)
- Depth of hold: 12 ft 9 in (3.9 m)
- Complement: 121
- Armament: 16 × 32-pounder carronades + 2 × 6-pounder bow chasers
- Notes: Fir-built

HMS Albatross was the name vessel of her class of brig-sloops. She was built of fir and launched in 1796. She captured two privateers in the North Sea. She then sailed to the Far East. There she captured two French privateers in single-ship actions. She was sold in the Far East in 1807 and broken up in 1810.

== Career ==
Commander George Scott commissioned Albatross in January 1796, for the North Sea

On 8 September 1797, Albatross 28 leagues south-west of the Naze of Norway when she encountered and captured the Dutch privateer Brave. Brave was armed with five carriage guns, eight swivel guns, and a complement of 40 men, of whom only 25 were board. She was under the command of Hendrick Meyer Ditless. She had left Egeroe, Norway on 2 September and had not captured anything.

On 14 November 1797, Albatross captured the French privateer Emouchet, of eight guns and 55 men. (Note: Emouchet, Tourneux, master was a 10-gun lugger, built by Michel Colin-Olivier between 1795 and 1796, and commissioned in Dieppe in April 1796. Her first cruise took place between April 1796 and March 1797 under François Clémence. For her second cruise, in 1797, she was under the command of Captain Tourneux. Emouchet had earlier captured the merchantman Air Balloon. An Emouchet is a small falcon, or hawk.)

Commander Scott was promoted to post captain on 15 June 1798. Commander Charles Adam recommissioned Albatross and sailed her to the East Indies. In March–June 1799, she was in the Red Sea. The British received information that the French had transferred warship frames to Suez to build some warships for the Red Sea. HMS Centurion sailed to Mokha, where she met up with Albatross and sailed with her to Suez. (Note: These may have been the first British warships ever to sail in the Red Sea.)

Commander Scott was promoted to post captain on 12 June 1799. Commander William Waller assumed command in 1800. Waller had been appointed in June 1799 to command Albatross, but had to wait until she returned from the Red Sea before he could replace Scott.

Albatross on 13 November 1800, captured the privateer brig Adèle, (or Adel), at 18°N 91°E. Adèle was armed with 10 guns and had a crew of 60 men. Adèle initially assumed that Albatross was a merchantman. When the two met, Adèle attempted to board Albatross. When Albatross repelled the attempt, Adèle attempted to escape, with Albatross sailing in chase. A close-quarters engagement ensued and eventually Adèle struck, and a British boarding party took possession of her.

Adèle had lost six men killed and 13 wounded. Albatross had lost one marine and one seaman (from HMS Braave) killed, and six men wounded (one of whom belonged to Braave and one to HMS Centurion). Nicholas Surcouf, Adèle's captain, surrendered to Waller and offered him his sword, which Waller, as a sign of respect, declined to take.

Albatross had captured Adèle some 90 leagues south of the Sandheads (at the mouth of the Ganges River). Adèle arrived at Kedgeree on 25 November.

On 23 March 1801 Albatross captured Gloire, Étienne Bourgoin, master, at 15°17′N 87°0′E. Albatross had chased Gloire and had finally caught up with her around noon. After a close and severe action that lasted about 20 minutes Bourgoin struck. Gloire had lost five men killed and 12 wounded, Bourgoin and some of his officers being among the wounded; Albatross had no casualties.

At the time of her capture Gloire was armed with 10 guns, though she was pierced for 18, and had a crew of 111 men. She had left Mauritius with 183 men, but had taken six prizes requiring prize crews; she had also sunk several other prizes that were not worth putting a prize crew aboard.

Shortly after Albatross arrived at Madras Roads, the New Madras Insurance Company presented Waller with an honour sword, and the Old Madras Insurance Company presented him with a piece of plate, each worth £200, as a reward for the service he had rendered by capturing Adèle andGloire.

Waller was promoted to post-captain on 8 January 1801.

In August 1801, Lieutenant Charles Malcolm, of HMS Suffolk, was promoted to the rank of Commander, in Albatross.

On 24 April 1802, Commander J. G. Vashon was promoted from command of Albatross to be captain of Fox. His replacement, c. May 1802, was Lord George Stuart, who was promoted to Commander into Albatross. He was promoted to post captain on 3 March 1804. In June Lieutenant John Batt took command of Albatross. His replacement, in January 1807, was Commander John Bastard, who was promoted to captain on 12 October 1807.

== Fate ==
Albatross was condemned at Bombay and was sold in April 1807. She was broken up in 1810.
