= HMS Swallow (1795) =

Sloop of the Royal Navy

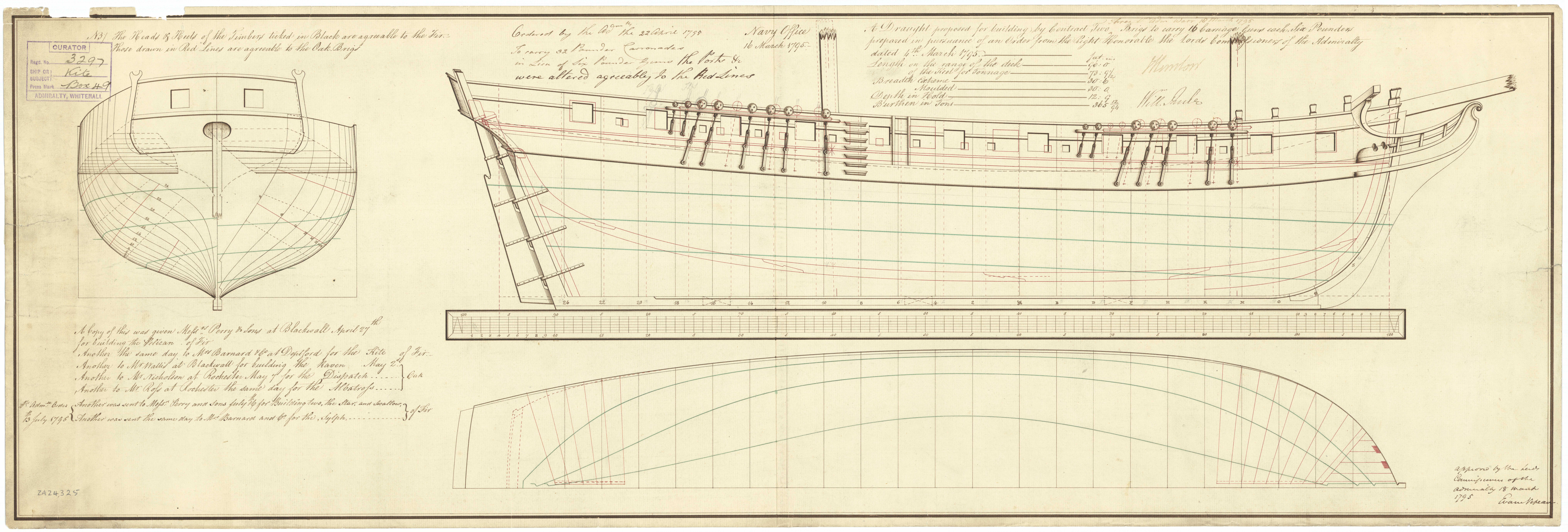
- Drawing showing the body plan with stern board outline, sheer lines with scroll figurehead, and longitudinal half-breadth used to build the Swallow and other ships, 1795

History

Great Britain
- Name: HMS Swallow
- Namesake: Swallow
- Ordered: 13 July 1795
- Builder: Perry & Hankey, Blackwall
- Laid down: July 1795
- Launched: 10 September 1795
- Fate: Sold August 1802

United Kingdom
- Name: Swallow
- Owner: Metcalf
- Acquired: 1802 by purchase
- Fate: No longer listed in the Register of Shipping after 1810
- Notes: Fir-built

General characteristics
- Type: Albatross-class brig-sloop
- Tons burthen: 369 52/94, or 390 (bm)
- Length: 96 ft 2 in (29.3 m) (gundeck); 73 ft 10 1/2 in (22.5 m) (keel)
- Beam: 30 ft 8 in (9.3 m)
- Depth of hold: 12 ft 9 in (3.9 m)
- Complement: HMS: 121; Armed whaler:36
- Armament: HMS:16 × 32-pounder carronades + 2 × 6-pounder bow chasers; Armed whaler:14 × 9-pounder guns

HMS Swallow was an 18-gun Albatross-class brig-sloop of the British Royal Navy, launched in 1795 and sold in 1802. During her naval career she captured a number of French privateers while on the Jamaica station. After her sale she became an armed whaler sailing under a letter of marque. As a privateer she captured two French whaling vessels but then is no longer listed after 1810.

== Naval career ==
The Royal Navy commissioned Swallow in October 1795 under the command of Commander George Fowke. He sailed her for the Jamaica station on 10 December. On 20 March 1796 Swallow was part of the squadron under the command of Rear-Admiral Hugh Cloberry Christian in Thunderer that escorted a convoy to the West Indies.

On 27 January 1797 Swallow captured the French privateer schooner Molinette. Swallow had been sailing from Cape Nichola Mole, when she encountered Molinette. Molinette was armed only with two swivel guns and had a crew of 18 men, four of whom where aboard an American schooner she had captured on 26 January. Molinette had left Gonaives on 21 January with the object of capturing American vessels travelling between British ports. (Note: Molinette was commissioned in January 1797 in Saint-Domingue as a privateer. Apparently she was registered as having 10 guns, and a crew of 105 men.)

On 11 March Swallow captured the French privateer schooner Port au Paix about four leagues outside Cape Nichola Mole. Port au Paix was armed with two swivel guns and carried a crew of 17 men. She had left Port au Paix four days earlier and not captured anything. (Note: Port de Paix was commissioned as a privateer in February 1797 in Saint-Domingue with 17 men and 2 guns.)

Between April and June Swallow captured the French privateer schooner Général Toussaint. Général Toussaint mounted eight guns and had a crew of five men. (Note: Général Toussaint Lourverture was commissioned as a privateer in February 1797 in Saint-Domingue with 50 men and 8 guns.)

Between October 1797 and March 1798 Swallow captured the French privateer Petit Resource. She was armed with two 3-pounder guns and two swivel guns. (Note: Petite Resource was commissioned as a privateer at Le Havre in late 1797. She was under the command of Jean-François Bunel. with 33 men and 3 to 6 guns, Petite Resource, of 32 tons "of load", had a crew of 33 men and 3-6 guns.)

In August 1798 Commander William Chilcott replaced Fowkes, who had received promotion to post-captain on 9 July.

Swallow captured the French privateer Buonaparte on 20 September 1798. (Note: A first-class share of the headmoney, which was not paid until 1828, was worth £53 12s 3d; a fifth-class share, that of a seaman, was worth 7s 11¼d.) Bonaparte was armed with six guns and had a crew of 50 men. (Note: Buonaparte was a privateer cutter built in Honfleur by Nicolas Loquet and commissioned in Rouen in 1798. She was of 58 tons of load, and had a complement of 45 to 50 men under the command of M. Degaule. The French Navy had requisitioned her from 4 April 1798 to 23 June 1798; in naval service she had a complement of three officers and 25 men.) (Note: Both the head-money notice and the mention in Schomberg agree that Commander William Sanderson was captain of Swallow at the time she captured Bonaparte. Admiralty records state that Sanderson only replaced Chilcott in May 1799. The Naval Chronicle reported that Sanderson took command of Swallow in November 1798, but that is still after he had captured Bonaparte.)

On 13 January 1799, Regulus, under the command of Captain George Fowke, and Swallow captured the Spanish brig Carmini.

Between 12 February 1799 and April, Swallow captured one merchant vessel.

In June 1799, Commander John Hayes replaced Sanderson.

Between 22 July and 27 October 1799 Swallow captured three merchant vessels:

- Spanish schooner Saint Cecilia, sailing from Porto Rico to Jamaica (with a false pass), carrying fustic;
- Small French schooner-rigged boat, sailing from Jeremie to Cuba, carrying 26 bags of coffee and 65 watches; Swallow removed the cargo and sent the boat on her way; and,
- Spanish brig Florentina, of 150 tons, sailing from Campeachy to Cuba with a cargo of logwood and rice.

During that same period when she was in company with Lowestoffe and Volage, she shared in the capture of five merchant vessels, one a letter of marque:

- Spanish Letter of marque ship Navarra (alias Diligene), of eight guns and 150 tons, sailing from Bilbao to Veracruz with a cargo of wine, iron, and writing paper;
- Spanish zartan Ambrosia, sailing from Cádiz to Veracruz with 26½ tons of quicksilver and 10 tons of writing paper;
- Spanish brig San Francisco, of 90 tons, sailing from Campeachy to Havana, carrying a cargo of sugar and logwood;
- Spanish schooner Maria Josepha, sailing from New Orleans to Havana, with cotton, cochineal, and logwood; and,
- Spanish schooner Tres Amigos, of 109 tons, sailing from Vera Cruz to Havana, carrying logwood, hides, and soap.

Between 28 February 1800 and 20 May, Swallow detained two Spanish schooners:

- St. Josef, sailing from Truxillo to Kingston, carrying gums and indigo; and *
- Nostra Senora de Arangaze, carrying indigo and specie.

In the period from 20 May to 8 August, Swallow detained the Spanish felucca Baldenaro, which was carrying oil and wine.

Between 3 August 1800 and 3 January 1801, Swallow detained three vessels:

- Spanish schooner privateer Atlas, of 95 tons; (Note: Head money for Atlas, alias Joachina, was paid in June 1829. A first-class share was worth £100 18s 4d; a fifth-class share was worth 17s 5½d.)
- Spanish polacre N. S. del Remedios, of 100 tons, carrying dry goods; and,
- Danish schooner Hercules, of 60 tons, carrying dry goods.

In May 1801, Commander John Davie replaced Hayes.

Disposal: The Principal Officers and Commissioners of His Majesty's Navy first offered "Swallow, 381 Tons, Copper-Bottomed and Copper-fastened, lying at Portsmouth" for sale on 7 August 1802. She sold there that month.

== Privateer and whaler ==
"Metcalf" purchased Swallow. Her master was David Smyth Simmons (or David Symonds Smith, or C.F. Smith). David Smyth Simmons received a letter of marque on 1 June 1803. She then sailed on 26 June.

Around 15 May 1804 Swallow sent the French whaler Hero (Héros) into Falmouth. During the Peace of Amiens, the French resumed whaling and on 10 February 1803 Captain Stephen Rawson sailed Hero from Le Havre for Walvis Bay, where she stayed for a month from 24 May to 23 June. (Note: Héros had been built at Calcutta in 1797 and was of 267 tons "of load". Hyppolite de Longuemare commissioned her at Le Havre in February. Unfortunately, a list of vessels built on the Hooghly River has no vessel by that name, and the two vessels listed as being built in 1797 are large merchantmen.)

Hero sailed in company with Baleine, of Le Havre, Captain Reuben Baxter. (Note: Baleine had been built in America as Hero, of 334 tons of load. Hottinger and Co. commissioned her at Le Havre in December. This account has her leaving for Walvis Bay in late December. The change of name from Héros/Hero apparently was to avoid confusion between her and the other Héros from Le Havre.) Between 10 July and 15 August they cruised the coast, but after having gathered only 200 barrels of oil, they sailed first to St Helena and then to St Catherine, Brazil. Swallow captured both Hero and Baleine. Swallow was reported to have arrived at Rio de Janeiro on 17 August 1804. As noted earlier, Swallow took Hero back to Britain. Swallow apparently abandoned Baleine, though in what state, and what happened to her subsequently, is not clear.

There are accounts that Swallow engaged in whaling in 1807 and 1809-10. Although there is no record of her in Lloyd's Register after 1805, she does appear in the Register of Shipping in 1809 with F. Smyth, master, Metcalf, owner, and trade London-South Seas fisheries. She is last listed in 1810 with the same information.
