= Air Balloon (1784 Hull ship) =

British merchant ship 1784–1797

History

Great Britain
- Name: Air Balloon
- Namesake: Montgolfier Brothers' 1783 hot air balloon
- Launched: 1784, Hull
- Captured: 9 September 1797

General characteristics
- Tons burthen: 224, or 400 (bm)

Air Balloon was launched in 1784 at Hull. She traded between Hull and Petersburg until a French privateer captured her in 1797.

== Career ==
Air Balloon first appeared in Lloyd's Register (LR) in 1784. (Note: She was one of at least two vessels launched that year, following the Montgolfier Brothers launching the first documented flight in a hot air balloon.)

Year	Master	Owner	Trade	Source & note
1784	R.Metcalf; John Briggs; William Moony	M.Metcalf	Hull–Peterburg	LR
1797	Farthing; R.Metcalf	M.Metcalf	Hull–Peterburg	LR; damages repaired 1785, & repairs 1793 & 1797

== Fate ==
On 9 September 1797, the French privateer lugger Hawk, of 10 guns and six swivel guns, captured Air Balloon, Metcalf, master, some 14 leagues off the Naze. (Note: Another source identified the privateer as Émouchet, Tourneux, master. (An émouchet is a small falcon, or goshawk.) Émouchet was a 10-gun lugger, built by Michel Colin-Olivier between 1795 and 1796, and commissioned in Dieppe in April 1796. Her first cruise took place between April 1796 and March 1797 under François Clémence. For her second cruise, in 1797, she was under the command of Captain Tourneux.) Air Balloon was on her way back to Hull from Petersburg with a cargo of iron, deals, and flax. Hawk was two days out of Dordt, and had not taken anything prior to capturing Air Balloon. The French took Metcalf and his crew, all but his mate and a boy, aboard their lugger and sailed for Calais. However a gale came up and the French could not get into Calais. They threw seven of their guns overboard and with great difficulty made it into the Texel. Her captor sent Air Balloon into Norway. (Note: HMS Albatross captured Emouchet on 14 November 1797.)
