= Gloire (1799 ship) =

1799 ship

History

France
- Name: Gloire
- Builder: Bayonne
- Launched: 1799
- Captured: March 1801

United Kingdom
- Name: HMS Trincomalee
- Namesake: Trincomalee
- Acquired: 1801 by purchase post-capture
- Fate: Sold August 1802

United Kingdom
- Name: Trincomalee?
- Acquired: 1802 by purchase
- Captured: late 1803

France
- Name: Émilien
- Acquired: Late 1803 by capture
- Captured: September 1807

United Kingdom
- Name: HMS Emilien
- Acquired: 1807 by capture
- Fate: Sold 1808

General characteristics
- Tons burthen: Gloire: 300 (French; "of load"); HMS: 320 (bm)
- Length: 80 ft 2 in (24.4 m) (overall); c.
- Sail plan: Brig
- Complement: Gloire (privateer): 183; 111 at capture; HMS:121; Émilien:150
- Armament: Gloire: 16 × 6-pounder guns; HMS: 16 × 6-pounder guns; Émilien: 18 guns (at capture)

Gloire was a ship launched at Bayonne in 1799 as an armed merchantman. She became a privateer in the Indian Ocean that the British captured in 1801 in a notable single-ship action. The Royal Navy commissioned her as HMS Trincomalee, but then sold her in 1803. The French recaptured her in 1803 and recommissioned her as the privateer Émilien, but the British recaptured her in 1807 and recommissioned her as HMS Emilien, before selling her in 1808.

== Gloire ==
Was a three-masted corvette-like ship built in Bayonne and commissioned in Bordeaux in 1799 under Captain Emit as an armed merchantman. After her arrival at Île de France (Mauritius) in May she was recommissioned as a privateer under Captain Étienne Bourgoin.

Gloire sailed from Île de France on the evening of 25 August 1800, in company with the privateer Adèle.

On 23 March 1801 HMS Albatross, Captain William Waller captured Gloire, Étienne Bourgoin, master, at 15°17′N 87°0′E. Albatross had chased Gloire and had finally caught up with her around noon. After a close and severe action that lasted about 20 minutes Bourgoin struck. Gloire had lost five men killed and 12 wounded, Bourgoin and some of his officers being among the wounded; Albatross had no casualties.

At the time of her capture Gloire was armed with 10 guns, though she was pierced for 18, and had a crew of 111 men. She had left Mauritius with 183 men, but had taken six prizes requiring prize crews; she had also sunk several other prizes that were not worth putting a prize crew aboard.

After his capture Bourgoin stated that Gloire could have escaped, but that his men had insisted on fighting. He also reported that some time earlier he had encountered the British East India Company's 24-gun cruizer Mornington. She had chased Gloire for some three days, and Bourgoin praised Lieutenant Henry Frost, Mornington's captain, for his seamanship.

Waller and Albatross had on 23 November 1800 captured Adèle. Shortly after Albatross arrived at Madras Roads, the New Madras Insurance Company presented Waller with an honour sword, and the Old Madras Insurance Company presented him with a piece of plate, each worth £200, as a reward for the service he had rendered by this capture and that of Gloire.

== HMS Trincomalee (or Trincomaley) ==
Admiral Peter Rainier wrote on 17 June 1801 to Lord Clive, Governor in Council, at Fort George, that he, Rainier, had found it necessary to purchase Gloire for "his majesty's service", that he had named her Trincomalee, and that he intended to put her under the command of a Commander.

Commander Peter Heywood took command of Trincomalee in June. In December she was off Cheduba Island. Heywood noted that provisions could be gotten there at reasonable prices.

Commander T. Pulham replaced Heywood. (Note: Pulham was Governor of the naval hospital at Madras. He transferred to command Trident upon Captain Henry Lidgbird Ball's return to England on private concerns, until Heywood could replace him. Pulham was to replace Heywood on Trincomalee.) The Royal Navy sold Trincomalee in January 1802.

== Merchantman ==
She became a merchantman, probably under her existing name. In late 1803 the French recaptured her and recommissioned her as the privateer Émilien.

== Émilien ==
A notice in the Gazette de l'Isle de France on 9 July 1806 stated that Émilien would leave on a cruise in a few days.

Culloden, Captain Christopher Cole, captured Émilien on 26 September 1806 after a chase that lasted two days and a night. He described her as a ship corvette of 18 guns and 150 men. When the British took possession of Emilien at 2a.m. on the 25th, close off the shoals of Point Guadaveri they found out that they had driven her ashore the night before. She had had to jettison 12 guns, her anchors, and her boats, to enable her to be refloated. (Note: Between 1793 and 1816, the French colony of Yanam, which sits on the Godavari River, was under British control.) Cole noted that Emilien was "formerly His Majesty's Sloop Trincomalee". He further noted that she was copper fastened, and that under the name of Gloire had "annoyed our Trade". However, on this cruise she was two months out of Île de France without having made any captures. (Note: Demerliac reported that Émilien was captured either by Culloden on 26 September, or on 10 January 1807 near Machilipatnam by an unknown British cruiser.)

== HMS Emilien ==
The Royal Navy took Émilien into service as HMS Emilien. (Note: Demerliac reports that the British gave her back her old name, HMS Trincomalee. This is incorrect.) However, The Navy sold her around 1808.
