= Albatross-class brig-sloop =

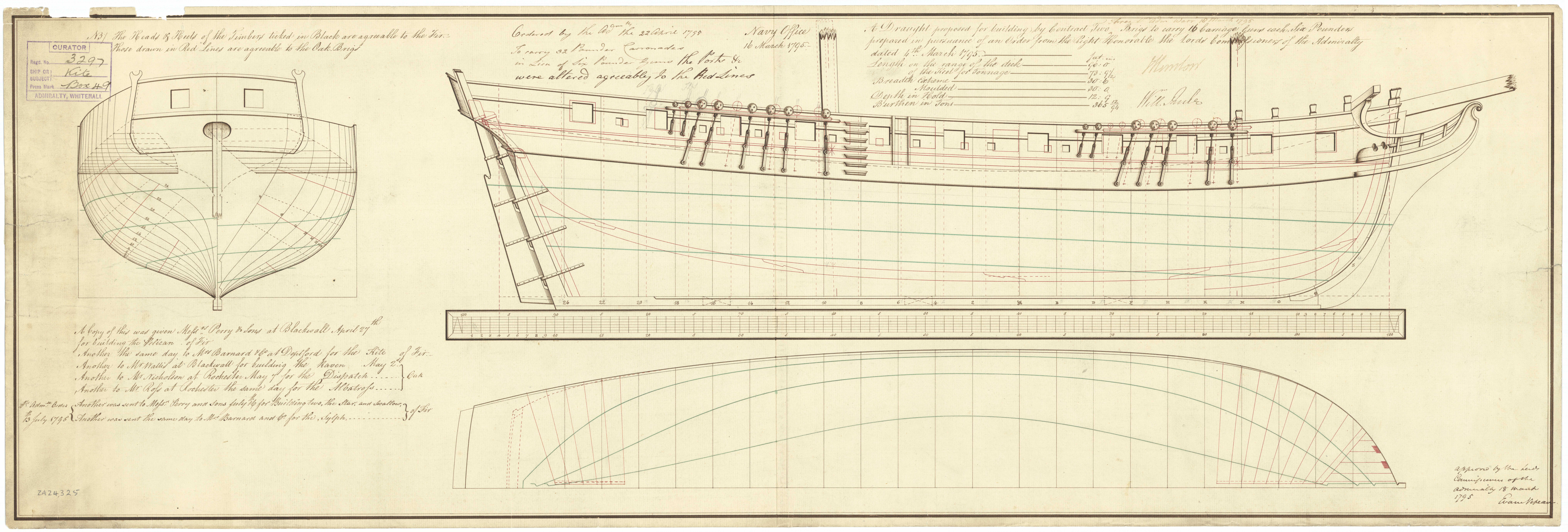
- Drawing showing the body plan with stern board outline, sheer lines with scroll figurehead, and longitudinal half-breadth proposed for building the Albatross-class ships, 1795

Class overview
- Name: Albatross-class brig-sloop
- Operators: Royal Navy
- In service: 1795 - 1807
- Completed: 8

General characteristics
- Type: Brig-sloop
- Tons burthen: 369 14/94 bm
- Length: 96 ft 0 in (29.26 m) (gundeck); 73 ft 9.5 in (22.492 m) (keel)
- Beam: 30 ft 6 in (9.30 m)
- Depth of hold: 12 ft 9 in (3.89 m)
- Sail plan: Brig-rigged
- Complement: 121
- Armament: 2 × 6-pdr cannon as bow chasers; 16 × 32-pdr carronades

The Albatross class were built as a class of eight 18-gun brig-sloops for the Royal Navy. They were originally to have carried sixteen 6-pounder carriage guns, but on 22 April 1795 it was instructed that they should be armed with sixteen 32-pounder carronades, although two of the 6-pounders were retained as chase guns in the bows. Consequently, they were classed as 18-gun sloops. However, in service it was found that this armament proved too heavy for these vessels, and so in most vessels the 32-pounder carronades were replaced by 24-pounder ones.

The class was designed by one of the Surveyors of the Navy - William Rule - and approved on 22 April 1795. Five vessels to this design were ordered in March 1795; the prototype was named Pelican on 11 June 1795 and the other five names were assigned and registered on 20 June. Three more were ordered in July 1795; these were named and registered on 28 August.

== Construction ==
In early 1795 the Admiralty identified the need for additional brig-sloops to meet the urgent need for convoy duties, and - as per their usual practice - commissioned two different designs, one from each Surveyor. Five vessels to each design were ordered in March 1795, with a further three to each design following in July.

Three of the first orders (Pelican, Kite and Raven) were constructed of "fir" (actually, pine), while the other two were of the normal oak construction. The three ordered in July were all also of fir construction. Fir-built vessels could be constructed more rapidly; hence five out of six of these were launched by the end of September 1795 (the Raven was delayed), when the two built of the conventional oak were still all on the stocks. However, it was recognised that fir hulls deteriorated faster, so that the use of this material was seen as a stop-gap measure to get them faster into service, with the consequence that they would not last as long.

== Ships ==
Name	Launched	Fate
Pelican	17 June 1795	Sold out of service at Jamaica in 1806.
Kite	17 July 1795	Sold to be broken up in September 1805.
Dispatch	15 December 1795	Transferred to the Russian Navy in January 1796; wrecked 1805.
Albatross	30 December 1795	Sold out of service at Bombay in 1807.
Raven	11 January 1796	Wrecked at the mouth of the Elbe River on 3 February 1798.
Star	29 August 1795	Sold to be broken up in January 1802.
Sylph	3 September 1795	Laid up at Portsmouth in November 1805 and broken up in April 1811.
Swallow	10 September 1795	Sold in August 1802; became a whaler and last listed 1805.
