= Dispatch (1795 ship) =

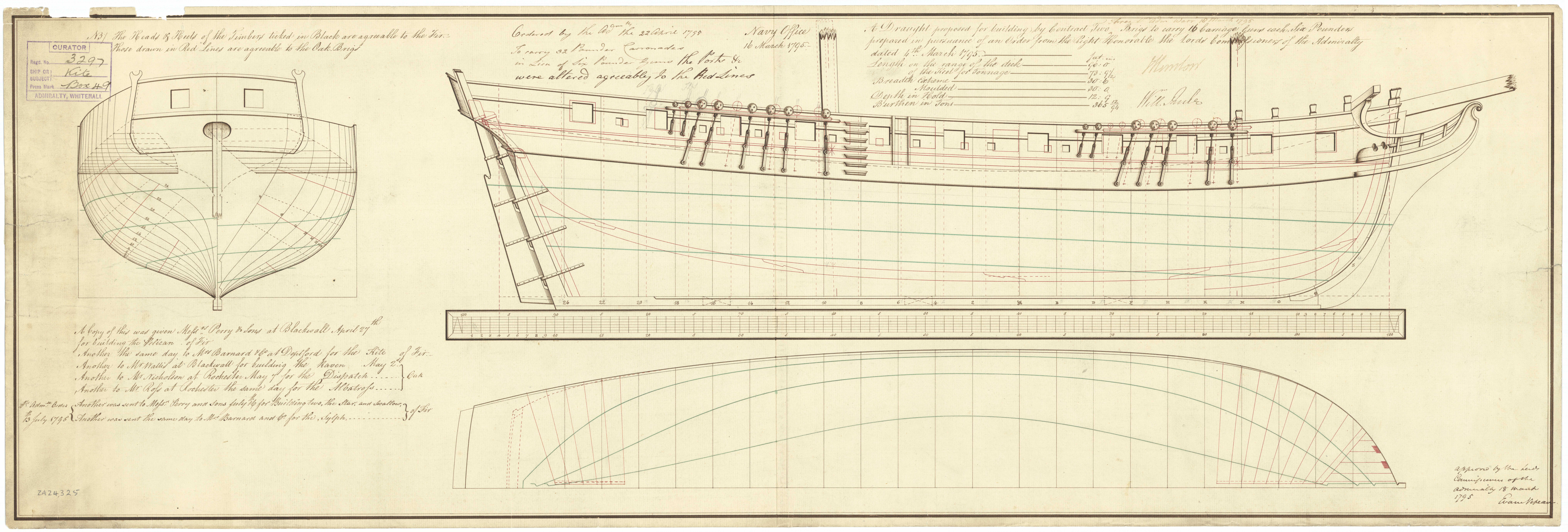
- Drawing showing the body plan with stern board outline, sheer lines with scroll figurehead, and longitudinal half-breadth used to build the Dispatch and other ships, 1795

History
- Name: Dispatch
- Ordered: 18 March 1795
- Builder: Samuel Nicholson, Chatham
- Laid down: May 1795
- Launched: 15 December 1795
- Christened: 20 June 1795
- Fate: Sold late 1795 or early 1796

Russian Empire
- Name: Dispatch
- Acquired: 1795 or 1796 by purchase
- Fate: Wrecked 18 October 1805

General characteristics
- Type: Albatross-class brig-sloop
- Tons burthen: 36512/94 (bm)
- Length: 96 ft 2 in (29.3 m) (gundeck); 73 ft 9 1/2 in (22.5 m) (keel)
- Beam: 30 ft 6 in (9.3 m)
- Depth of hold: 12 ft 9 1/2 in (3.9 m)
- Complement: HMS: 121; Russian Navy:130
- Armament: British design:16 × 32-pounder carronades + 2 × 6-pounder bow chasers; Russian Navy:18-20 guns
- Notes: Unlike six members of her eight-vessel class, Dispatch was built of oak, not fir. Vice-Admiral Khanykov noted that specifically in his report to St Petersburg.

Dispatch was an 18-gun, Albatross-class Albatross-class brig-sloop, launched in 1795, and intended for the British Royal Navy, but sold to the Imperial Russian Navy before commissioning. Between 1796 and 1805, she served in the North Sea and the Baltic Sea. She was wrecked in 1805.

== Origins ==
Vice-Admiral Khanykov reported to St Petersburg, in a dispatch discussed there on 16 May [O.S. 5 May] 1796, that he had purchased Dispatch at the behest of Catherine the Great, and that she was being fitted out and would be handed over to Russia.

Dispatch was transferred to Russia under an Admiralty Order dated 28 January 1796. She apparently was at Chatham on 27 February [O.S. 16 February], in company with two Russian ships of the line, suggesting that she was already under the Russian flag. However, British records show that she was struck from the Navy List and handed over at Chatham to the Russian Navy in March.

== Russian naval service ==
Dispatch left Britain for Russia on 5 October [O.S. 24 September] 1796, with the Russian fleet. Between 1796 and 1797, Dispatch served with the squadrons of Vice-Admiral Pyotr Khanykov and Vice-Admiral Mikhail Makarov, cruising between Copenhagen and England. In May 1797 she sailed with Makarov's First Division from Kronstadt, arriving in Britain in July.

Between 1798 and 1800, Makarov's Division operated in the North Sea and off the Texel. Initially, she served primarily as an advice boat, carrying messages between flagships. Later, she patrolled in the North Sea. On 27 June [O.S. 16 June] 1800 she left for Russia.

Then in 1801, Dispatch carried a courier to Britain. She spent 1802-03, cruising in the Baltic, and in 1805 escorted transports to Germany.

== Fate ==
Dispatch was wrecked off Rügen on 18 October [O.S. 5 October] 1805, during a storm. No people died.
