= Solidor Tower =

Coordinates: 48°38′2″N 2°1′34″W

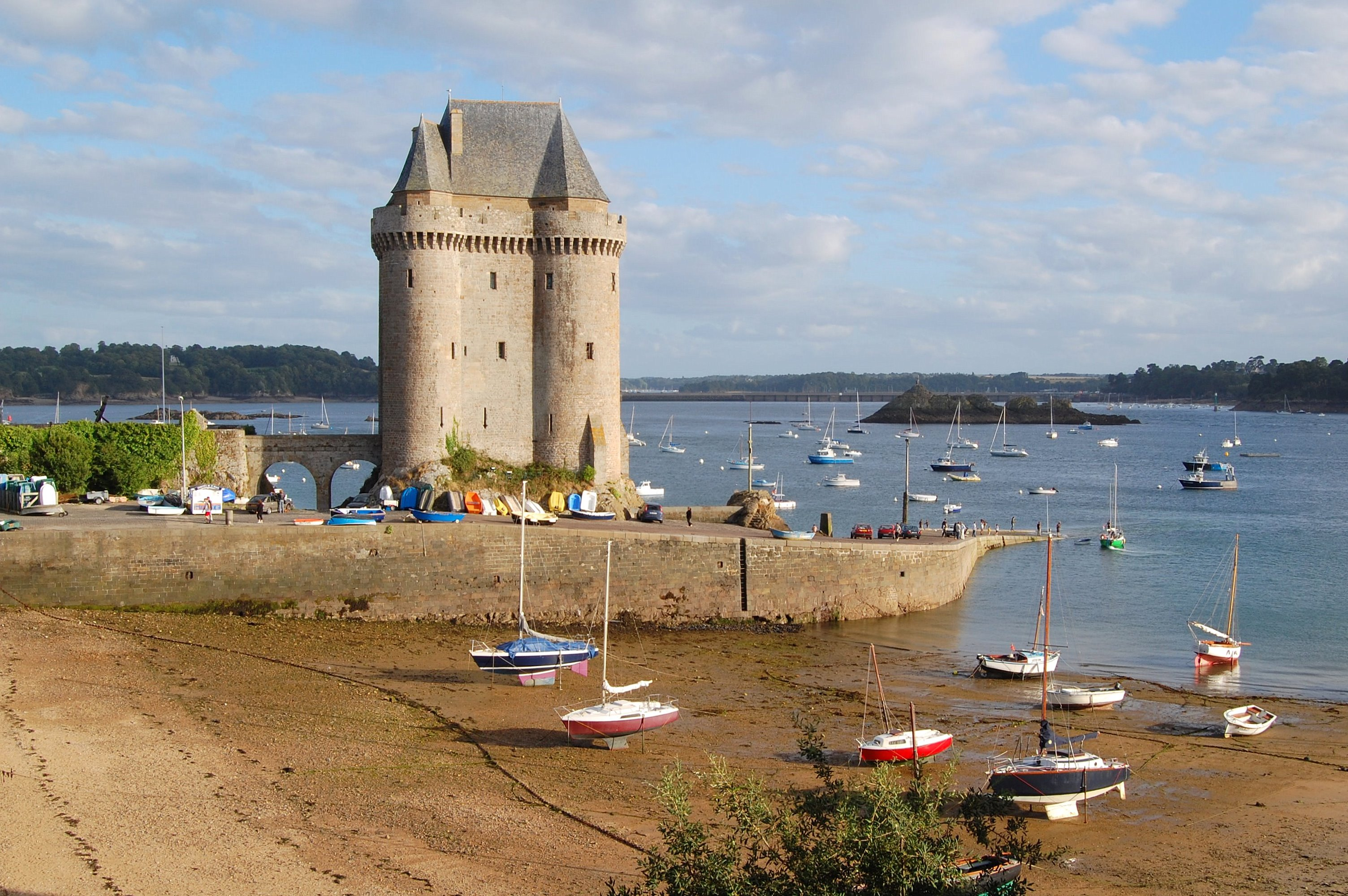
Solidor tower, in the background the Rance tidal power plant

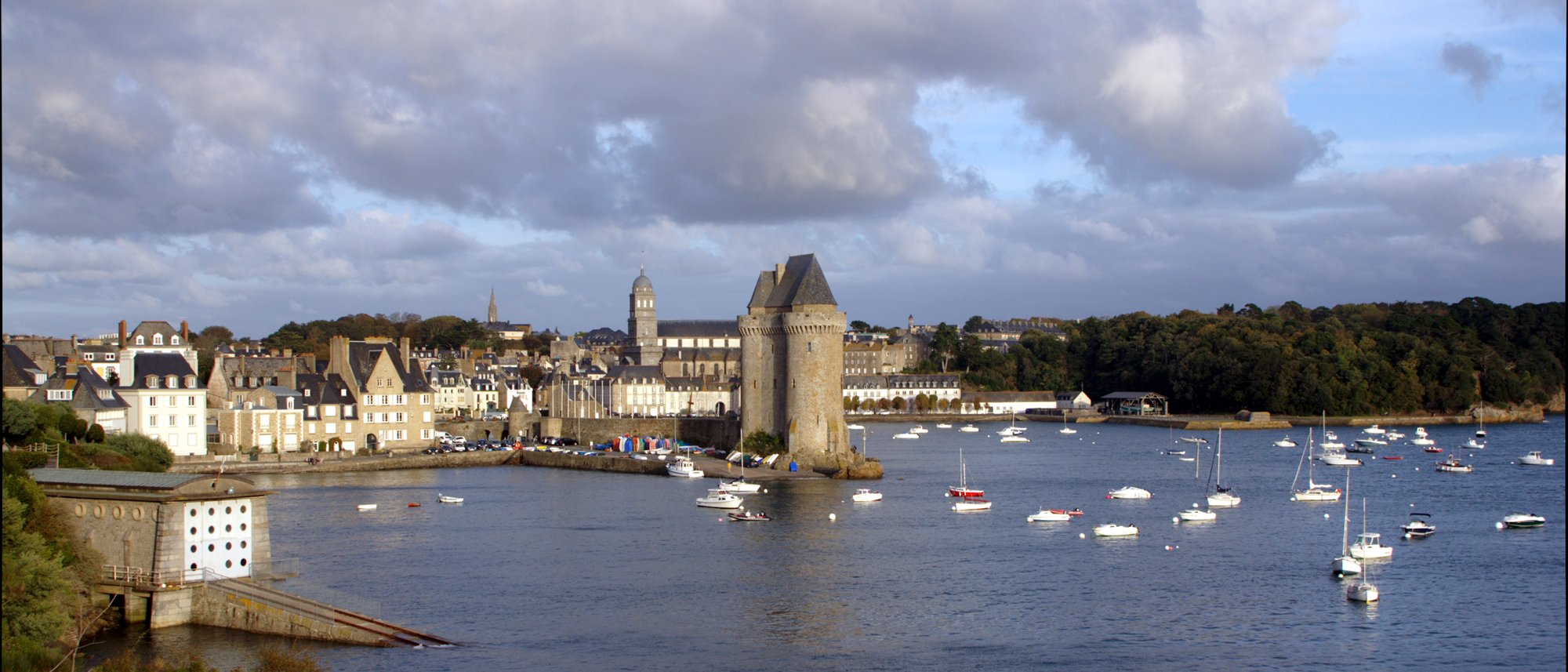
Solidor tower, with the town of Saint-Servan behind

Solidor Tower (French: tour Solidor) is a strengthened keep with three linked towers, located in the estuary of the river Rance in Brittany.

It was built between 1369 and 1382 by John IV, Duke of Brittany (i.e. Jean V in English) to control access to the Rance at a time when the city of Saint-Malo did not recognize his authority. Over the centuries the tower lost its military interest and became a jail. More recently it was a museum celebrating Breton sailors exploring Cape Horn, but it was permanently closed in 2022.

The Solidor Tower is located in the former town of Saint-Servan, which merged with Saint-Malo and Paramé in 1967.

It is featured in the 1957 Wendy Toye film True as a Turtle starring John Gregson, Cecil Parker, June Thorburn and Keith Michell.
