= HMS Bellona (1794) =

British gunboat (1794–1805)

History

Great Britain
- Name: HMS Bellona
- Acquired: 1794 by purchase
- Fate: Broken up August 1806

General characteristics
- Class & type: Sailing barge
- Tons burthen: 86 (bm)
- Complement: 25
- Armament: 2 × 18-pounder guns + 1 × 32-pounder guns

HMS Bellona was a Thames sailing barge, one of 11 that the Admiralty purchased in 1794 and stationed at Woolwich. Mr. J. Woodward, a sailing master, commissioned her in 1796. Mr. Richard Simmons replaced him in 1798. She became a mud barge in December 1799; she was broken up in 1805.
