= James Ralfe =

British writer on naval history

- Occupation: Writer on naval history

James Ralfe (fl. 1820–1829) was a British writer on naval history.

== Biography ==
Ralfe was the author of The Naval Chronology of Great Britain; an Historical Account of Naval and Maritime Events from the commencement of the War in 1803 to the end of the Year 1816 (3 vols. 8vo, London, 1820), a useful compilation, intended as a continuation of the Naval Chronology of Captain Isaac Schomberg, but on a more extended scale. It appears to have been issued in parts, the date on the title-page being that of the completion of the work. He afterwards wrote The Naval Biography of Great Britain, consisting of Historical Memoirs of those Officers of the British Navy who distinguished themselves during the reign of his Majesty George III, (4 vols. 4to, London, 1828). This was certainly published in parts, as appears from the reprint of the Memoir of Admiral Charles Stirling (12mo, 1826), and an appendix to the Memoir of Sir James Athol Wood, containing a criticism on it by Sir Charles Brisbane, dated 29 December 1827. The appendix also contains an account of the battle of Navarino, and in the following year, 1829, Ralfe issued a pamphlet in justification of Sir Edward Codrington's conduct. The matter of the several memoirs in the Naval Biography seems to have been for the most part contributed by the subjects of them, and may be accepted as correct as to facts. The inferences are less certain, and the style is stilted and verbose to an extreme degree. As a pecuniary venture, it is said to have been unsuccessful, and in 1829 an attempt was made by some of the senior officers of the navy to raise a fund for the author's benefit, the subscriptions to be paid to his publishers, Messrs. Whitmore & Fenn, 6 Charing Cross (advertisement at the end of the Navarino pamphlet).
