= Bellona (1812 ship) =

History

United Kingdom
- Name: Bellona
- Namesake: Bellona
- Owner: Fishburn and Broderick
- Builder: Fishburn and Broderick, Whitby
- Launched: 1812
- Fate: Lost 1814

General characteristics
- Tons burthen: 465 (bm)
- Armament: Two guns

Bellona was launched at Whitby in 1812. She was first listed in Lloyd's Register (LR) in 1812 with Foxton, master, and Fishburn, owner. She was lost near Brest on 21 January 1814. Lloyd's List reported that the transport Bellona, J. Foxton, master, was on a voyage from Passages to an English port when she was lost with the loss of all but three of her crew.
