= Bellony Cave =

Cave in Haiti

- Location: near Pestel, Grand'Anse, Corail Arrondissement
- Depth: 46 m
- Discovery: 2009

Bellony Cave is a karst cave located near the city of Pestel, Grand'Anse in the Corail Arrondissement of Haiti. The cave was recently uncovered during a 2009 expedition. Immediately after, trails were installed for guided tours, and gates were emplaced to preserve the more fragile regions of the cave. As a result, the cave remains in a pristine state. The cave is managed by the city of Pestel, despite being nearly an hour away by a combined car and walking journey.
