= HMS Mongoose =

Brig of the Royal Navy

History

Great Britain
- Name: HMS Mongoose
- Namesake: Mongoose
- Builder: Dutch origin
- Acquired: 1799 (or 1800) by capture
- Fate: Sold 1803

General characteristics
- Tons burthen: 140 (bm)
- Armament: 12 guns

HMS Mongoose was a Dutch prize to the British Royal Navy captured in 1799 or 1800 in the East Indies.

There is some question as to the name of her commander. One account states that Lieutenant Thomas Duvall commissioned her in 1800; other sources give the name as John Duval. One source states that John Duval was made Commander into her.

In September 1800 Vice-Admiral Peter Rainier received the Admiralty's permission to mount an expedition against Java, in particular to blockade Batavia. On 26 September he left instructions that the "armed vessel" Mongoose and certain other vessels should follow him to Penang as soon as they arrived at Madras Roads. Two days later, on the eve of his departure, he allocated his naval forces. Mongoose was either to accompany his flag in Victorious, or failing that, to proceed to the Straits of Malacca.

The Navy sold Mongoose in 1803.
