= Jacques François Perroud =

French privateer

Jacques François Perroud (1770 – 1822) was a French privateer, famed for his capture of the large East Indiaman Lord Nelson on 14 August 1803, and for his spirited defence of his 32-gun Bellone against the overwhelming 74-gun ship of the line HMS Powerful during the action of 9 July 1806.

== Career ==
Perroud was born in 1770 to a family from Bordeaux. From 1796, he operated from Mauritius, captaining the privateers Pichegrue and the Hasard from 1799.

On 6 July 1799, he captured the American merchantman Aurore, under Captain Sutter, and brought her back to Port-Louis. The ship was requisitioned to ferry prisoners to France, and Perroud took her command, arming her with eight guns and 30 men. Aurore departed from Mauritius on 23 August 1799 and arrived in Lorient on 9 May 1800.

From 1801, Perroud mounted the 34-gun 8-pounder frigate Bellone, with a crew of over 200 men. On 14 August 1803, he met with the large East Indiaman Lord Nelson. Overcoming his inferiority of artillery, Perroud managed to board his opponent at his second attempt and captured her.

In the action of 9 July 1806, Bellone was attacked by the 74-gun ship of the line HMS Powerful. She attempted to flee for almost two hours, trading shots with the much more potent opponent, before striking her colours. Perroud was commended for his spirited defence against overwhelming odds; William James, notably, described Perroud's actions as "extraordinary".

From 1807, Perroud captained the Curieux, and from 1809 the Confiance (formerly the French Navy frigate Minerve). On 3 February 1810, Confiance was captured by HMS Valiant, under Captain John Bligh.

Perroud then captained the privateer Phoenix, of Bordeaux. In her he captured several prizes before HMS Aigle captured him after a chase of 13 hours and 134 miles. His captor spoke admiringly of Perroud's seamanship during the chase.
