= HMS Powerful (1783) =

Ship of the line of the Royal Navy

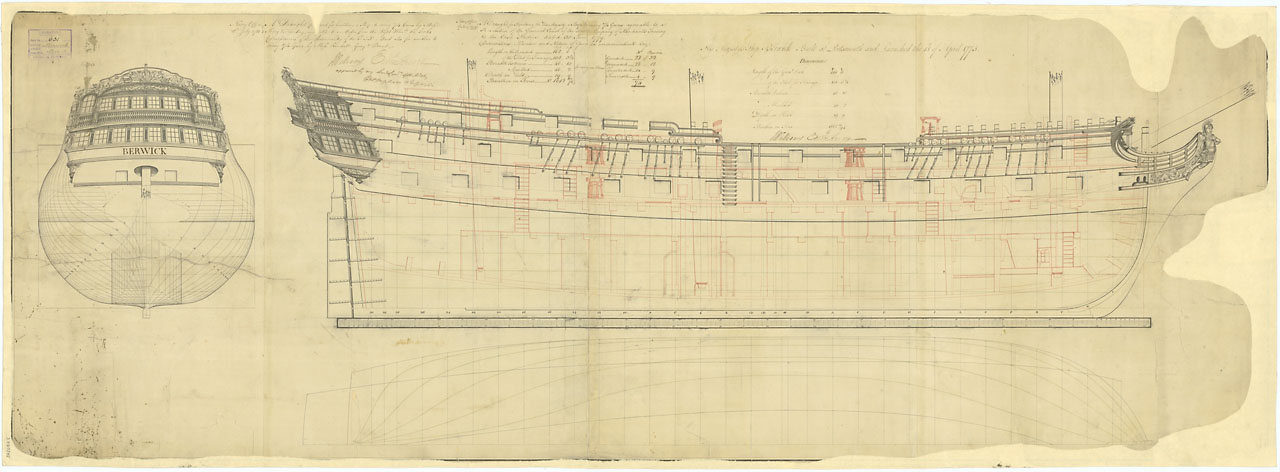
- Plan of Powerful

History

Great Britain
- Name: HMS Powerful
- Ordered: 8 July 1780
- Builder: Perry, Blackwall Yard
- Laid down: April 1781
- Launched: 3 April 1783
- Commissioned: 22 April 1783
- Decommissioned: October 1809
- Fate: Broken up, 1812

General characteristics
- Class & type: Elizabeth-class ship of the line
- Tons burthen: 1627 (bm)
- Length: 168 ft 6 in (51.36 m) (gundeck)
- Beam: 46 ft (14 m)
- Depth of hold: 19 ft 9 in (6.02 m)
- Propulsion: Sails
- Sail plan: Full-rigged ship
- Armament: Gundeck: 28 × 32-pounder guns; Upper gundeck: 28 × 18-pounder guns; QD: 14 × 9-pounder guns; Fc: 4 × 9-pounder guns

HMS Powerful was a 74-gun third rate ship of the line of the Royal Navy. She took part in the defeat of a Dutch fleet in the Battle of Camperdown in 1797, the capture of a French privateer in the action of 9 July 1806, in operations against the Dutch in the East Indies during the raids on Batavia and Griessie in 1806 and 1807, and finally in the Walcheren Campaign during 1809.

== Career ==
Powerful was launched on 3 April 1783 at Blackwall Yard, London, and was commissioned on 22 April, serving until 1 July 1788. In 1785, her crew included John Lyddiard, an American prisoner of war forcibly enlisted into the Royal Navy in 1778, during the American Revolutionary War. In July 1785, Lyddiard wrote to the United States ambassador to Britain, John Adams, to secure his release. In response to an appeal by Adams, the British government ordered Lyddiard's release.

After a period of time "in ordinary" and a refit at Plymouth Powerful was recommissioned in 1790. In early April 1793, soon after the declaration of war between France and England, Powerful, under the command of Captain Thomas Hicks, was part of a squadron commanded by Rear Admiral John Gell. The squadron sailed from the Mersey with orders to escort a convoy of East Indiamen to Finisterre. There Gell ordered Powerful and Boyne to accompany the convoy as far as the Cape. Soon after the remainder of the squadron captured two ships; the French 22-gun privateer General Dumourier, and her prize the Spanish ship St. Jago, captured 11 days earlier. The St. Jago had sailed from Lima loaded with some fifty-five to sixty tons of silver coin, gold bars, precious stones and plate, and in addition a valuable cargo of pewter, copper, bark, cocoa and wool. The treasure was shipped back to England and stored in the Tower of London while legal arguments raged. Eventually, in 1795 the Lords of Appeal awarded prize money set at £935,000 (equivalent to more than £100 million today) to the captors. Meanwhile, Boyne and Powerful were ruled not to have contributed towards the capture, and so received nothing. However, prize money was later awarded to the crew of Powerful for two ships; the French East Indiaman Countess of Trauttmansdorff captured on 1 August 1793, and for the British ship George of Liverpool, recaptured on 28 January 1794.

Captain William O'Bryen Drury assumed command of Powerful in August 1795, and was attached to the North Sea Fleet under Admiral Adam Duncan. Following the action of 12 May 1796, Powerful assisted Phoenix in taking prisoners from the captured Dutch frigate Argo. She was also one of several ships of the fleet that received prize money for the capture of the French privateer Franklyn on 1 November 1796.

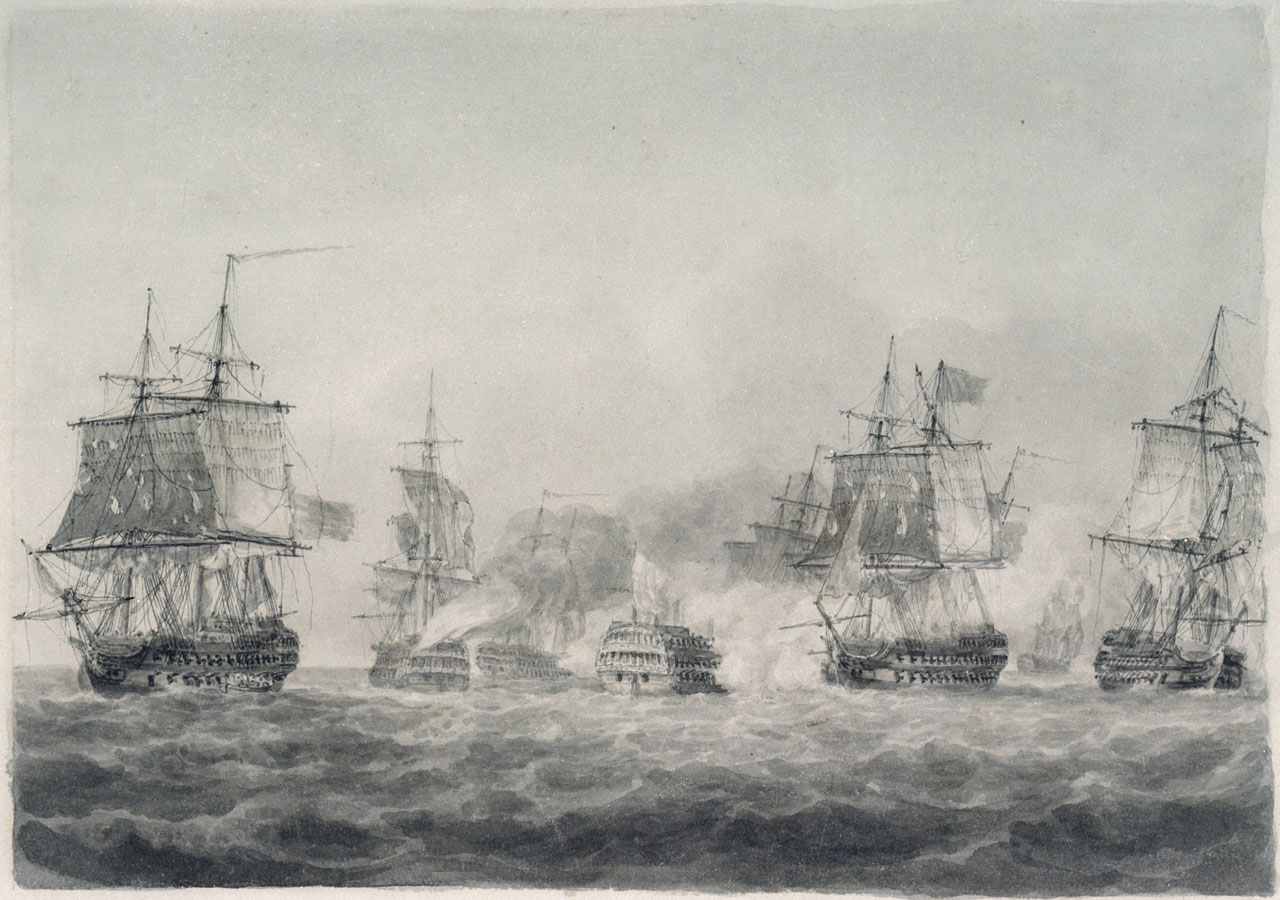
Powerful at the Battle of Camperdown 1797, by Nicholas Pocock

On 11 October 1797 Powerful took part in Duncan's defeat of a Dutch fleet in the Battle of Camperdown. As the second ship in Vice Admiral Richard Onslow's leeward division she followed Monarch in breaking the enemy line and was heavily engaged thereafter. In the aftermath of the battle she reported 88 casualties; eight seamen and two marines killed, and four officers and 74 seamen and marines wounded. She later received her share of the £120,000 in prize money awarded for the captured enemy ships.

In 1798 Powerful joined a squadron in the Mediterranean under Admiral Earl St. Vincent, and was mainly employed in operations off Cádiz, being awarded her share of prize money for the capture by the squadron of numerous prizes between February and October 1798.

From 1800 Powerful, under the command of Captain Sir Francis Laforey, served in the Baltic, Mediterranean, and the West Indies up until the Peace of Amiens. She received her shares of prize money as part of a squadron in the Baltic commanded by Vice Admiral Charles Pole that captured the Mary on 8 September 1801, and the Exporteur and Wussa Orden on 17 September 1801.

Captain Robert Plampin assumed command of her in August 1805.

The ship arrived too late to take part in the Battle of Trafalgar in November 1805, and was later sent to reinforce the East India squadron, which was commanded by Rear Admiral Edward Pellew. On 13 June 1806 Powerful captured the French privateer Henriette off Trincomalee, Sri Lanka. Powerful had received intelligence of her presence in the area and set out from Trincomalee on the 11th. She sighted Henriette on the morning of the 13th. After an 11-hour chase, during which Henriette fired her stern guns at Powerful without effect, Powerful succeeded in catching up to her quarry, which surrendered without further combat. During the chase, Henriette's crew had thrown four of her 6-pounder guns overboard in an attempt to lighten her and so gain speed. Head money was paid for Henriette in January 1814.

In the action of 9 July 1806, disguised as an East Indiaman, and together with the sloop Rattlesnake, she captured the French privateer Bellone, which had been a serious threat to British trade.

Powerful also took part in Pellew's raid on Batavia of 27 November 1806, and the subsequent raid on Griessie in early December 1807, which effectively eliminated Dutch naval forces in the Pacific.

The following year Powerful returned to England under the command of Captain Charles James Johnston, where despite her poor material condition she was pressed into service during the Walcheren Campaign. Powerful was finally paid off at Chatham in October 1809.

== Fate ==
Powerful was broken up in 1812.
