= French privateer Bellone (1745) =

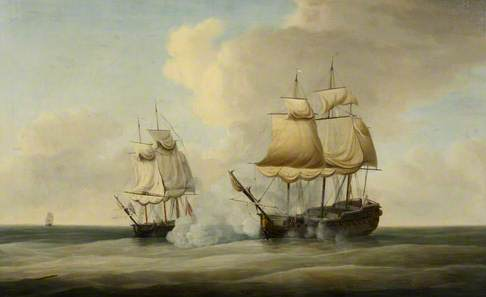
- HMS Bellona (left) captures the Duc de Chartres, 18 August 1747, by Dominic Serres

History

France
- Name: Bellone
- Namesake: Bellona (goddess)
- Builder: Nantes
- Laid down: 1744
- Launched: January 1745
- Fate: Captured in 1747

Great Britain
- Name: HMS Bellona
- Acquired: 1747
- Commissioned: May 1747
- Fate: Sold in 1749

General characteristics
- Propulsion: Sail
- Sail plan: ship-rigged

Bellone was a French privateer. Bellone was involved in a naval battle in Loch nan Uamh during the Jacobite rising. She was captured in 1747. She was taken into Royal Navy service as HMS Bellona and was sold in 1749.

== French service ==
Following the Jacobite defeat at the Battle of Culloden on 16 April 1746, Bellone and Mars anchored at Loch nan Uamh on 30 April 1746.

Upon the approach of the Royal Navy vessels HMS Greyhound, HMS Baltimore, and HMS Terror, Captain Claude Lory of La Bellone set sail; Captain Antoine Rouillé of Le Mars decided to stay at anchor. After Greyhound attacked Le Mars, La Bellone engaged HMS Greyhound and Bellone suffered a broken mast after a broadside. HMS Greyhound attempted to board La Bellone, however after firing two broadsides into HMS Greyhound, La Bellone then disabled HMS Terror with a volley. La Bellone led Le Mars out into the head of Loch nan Uamh where Le Mars started her repairs, while La Bellone engaged the British ships. HMS Baltimore, HMS Greyhound, and HMS Terror tried to board the French ships, but were again repelled, HMS Baltimore's captain sustaining a head wound. La Bellone had her rigging shattered and lost an anchor and two of her masts. The damaged HMS Baltimore then headed for The Minch to get help while La Bellone again engaged HMS Greyhound, causing damage to her main mast and setting fire to her hand grenades.

Three Royal Navy ships - HMS Nottingham, Eagle, and Warspite – captured Bellone on 2 February 1747.

== English service ==
Bellona was commissioned in May 1747, under the command of Captain Samuel Barrington, who took the Duke de Chartres an outbound Indiaman that same year on 17 August 1747.

She was sold in 1749 at Deptford for £611.

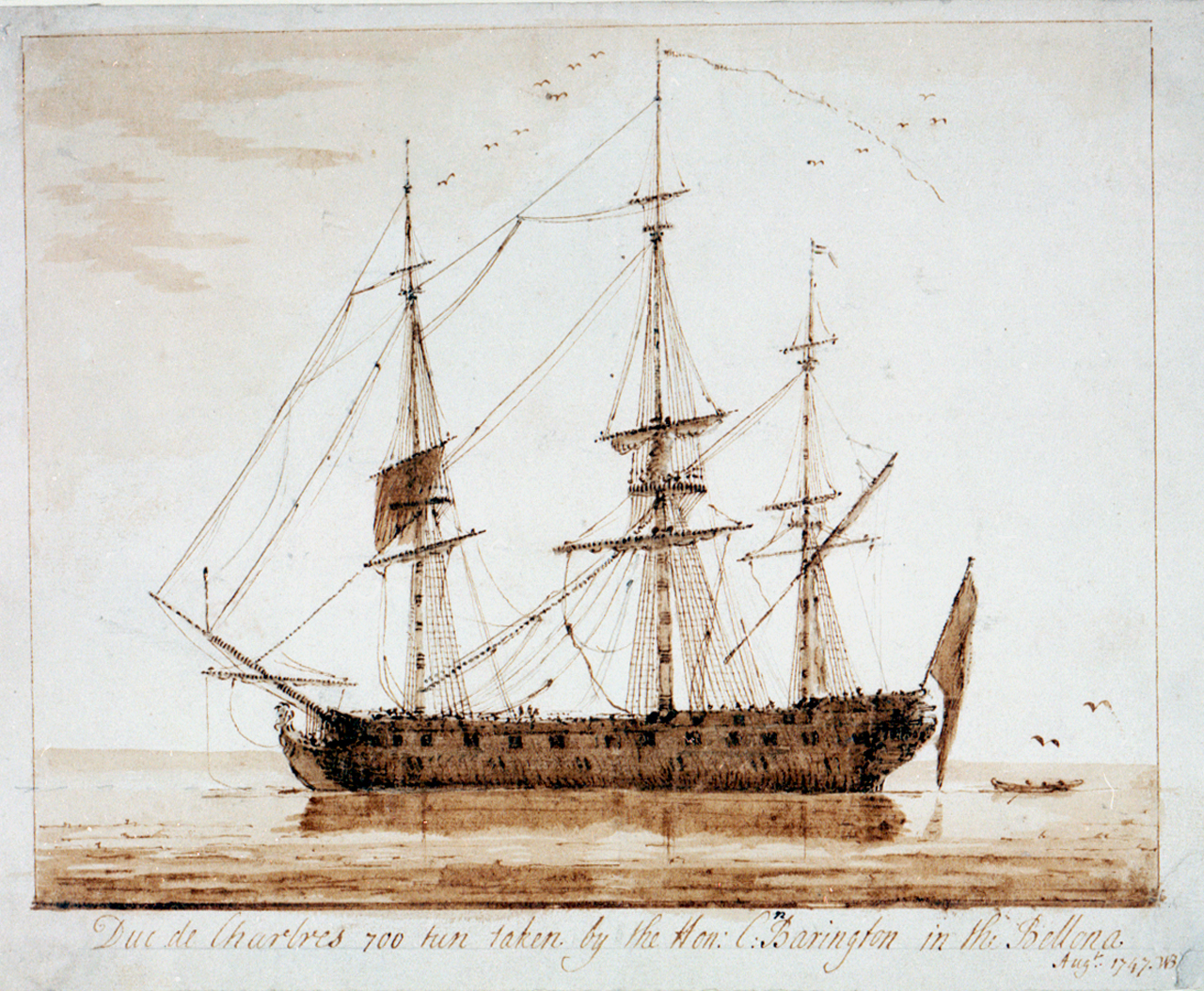
Duc de Chartres 700 tun taken by the Hon, Cn Barrington in the Bellona 18 August 1747
