= Nicolas Surcouf =

French privateer

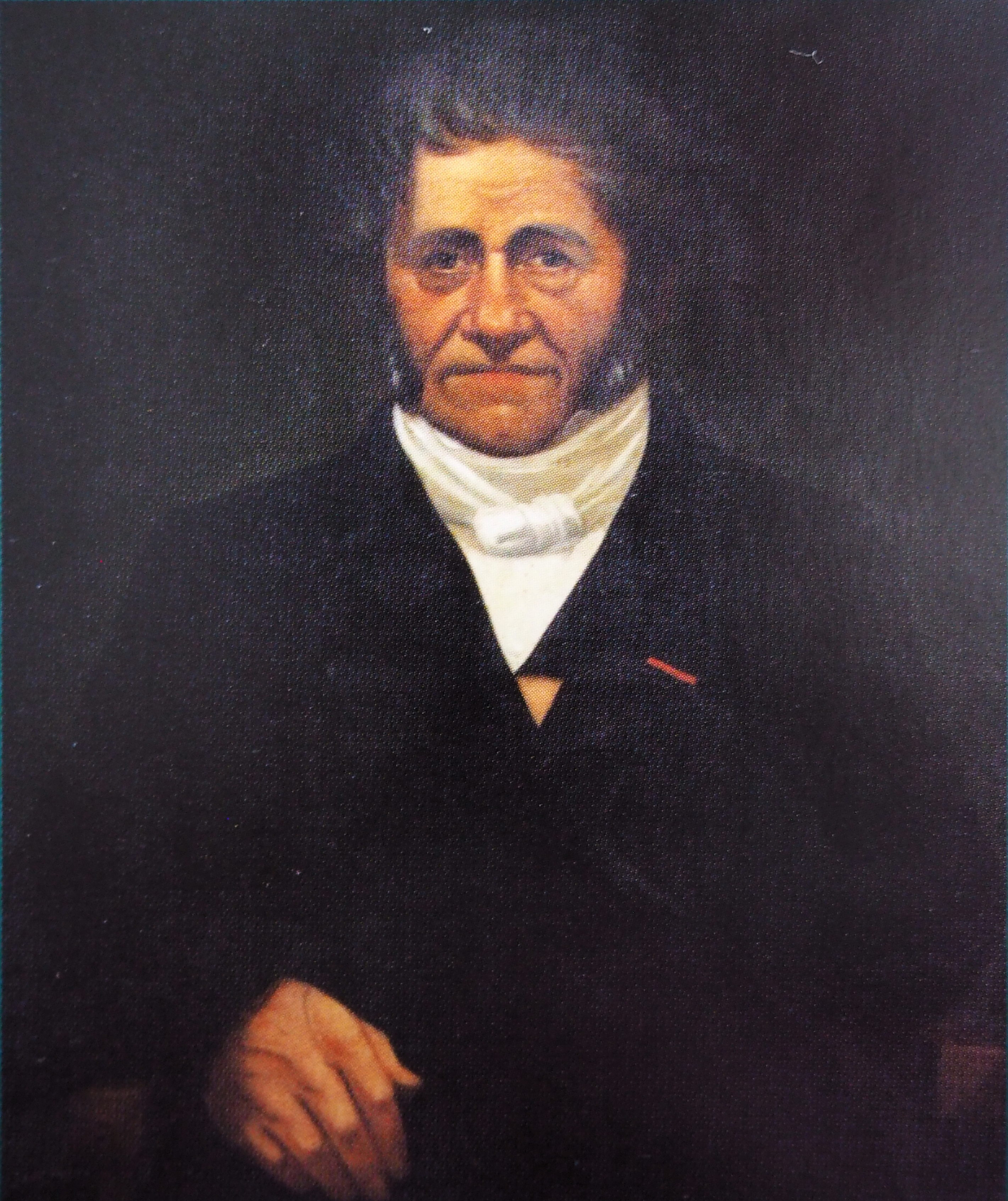
- Born: 1770
- Died: 1848 (aged 77–78)

Nicolas Surcouf (1770, Saint-Malo – 1848) was a French privateer. He was the brother and lieutenant of one of France's most famous and successful privateers, Robert Surcouf. Nicholas was the second eldest of four brothers, and Robert the second youngest.

== Career ==
In 1798 Nicholas sailed as second captain to Robert in Clarisse. On 3 January 1800, she detected two American 16-carronade ships forming a line of battle, which Surcouf engaged. Clarisse raked the rear-most ship, Louisa, and boarded her, while simultaneously firing a broadside on the other ship, Mercury, which attempted to rescue her mate. Nicolas led a 30-man boarding party to seize Louisa, while Mercury escaped. Clarisse could not give chase, her bowsprit having been destroyed in a collision with Louisa. Nicolas Surcouf took a prize crew and sailed Louisa back to Port Louis.

In May 1800, Nicolas Surcouf captained the privateer Adèle. He captured several small prizes, but on 12 November 1800, he encountered the brig-sloop HMS Albatross, which captured Adèle. Nicolas Surcouf surrendered to Captain Waller and offered him his sword, which Waller, as a sign of respect, declined to take; Surcouf was taken prisoner and sent to Calcutta, before ending up in England on a prison ship.

In 1804, Robert Surcouf returned to Saint-Malo and started equipping privateers. He gave Nicolas command of the 14-gun Caroline, on which Nicolas cruised the Indian Ocean. Nicholas captured the ships Waldegrave and Commerce in the Indian Ocean, and Melville and Prince de Galles in the Gulf of Bengal (Note: Gallois lists these ships with French names, probably translating from the English original.)

On 30 August 1815, Nicolas Surcouf joined the brig Amitié, under Captain Beaudouin.

After his career as a privateer, Nicolas Surcouf entered business as a fishing shipowner. He outfitted a number of ships for cod fishing off Newfoundland between 1798 and 1840.
