= HMS Bellona (1806) =

French privateer frigate

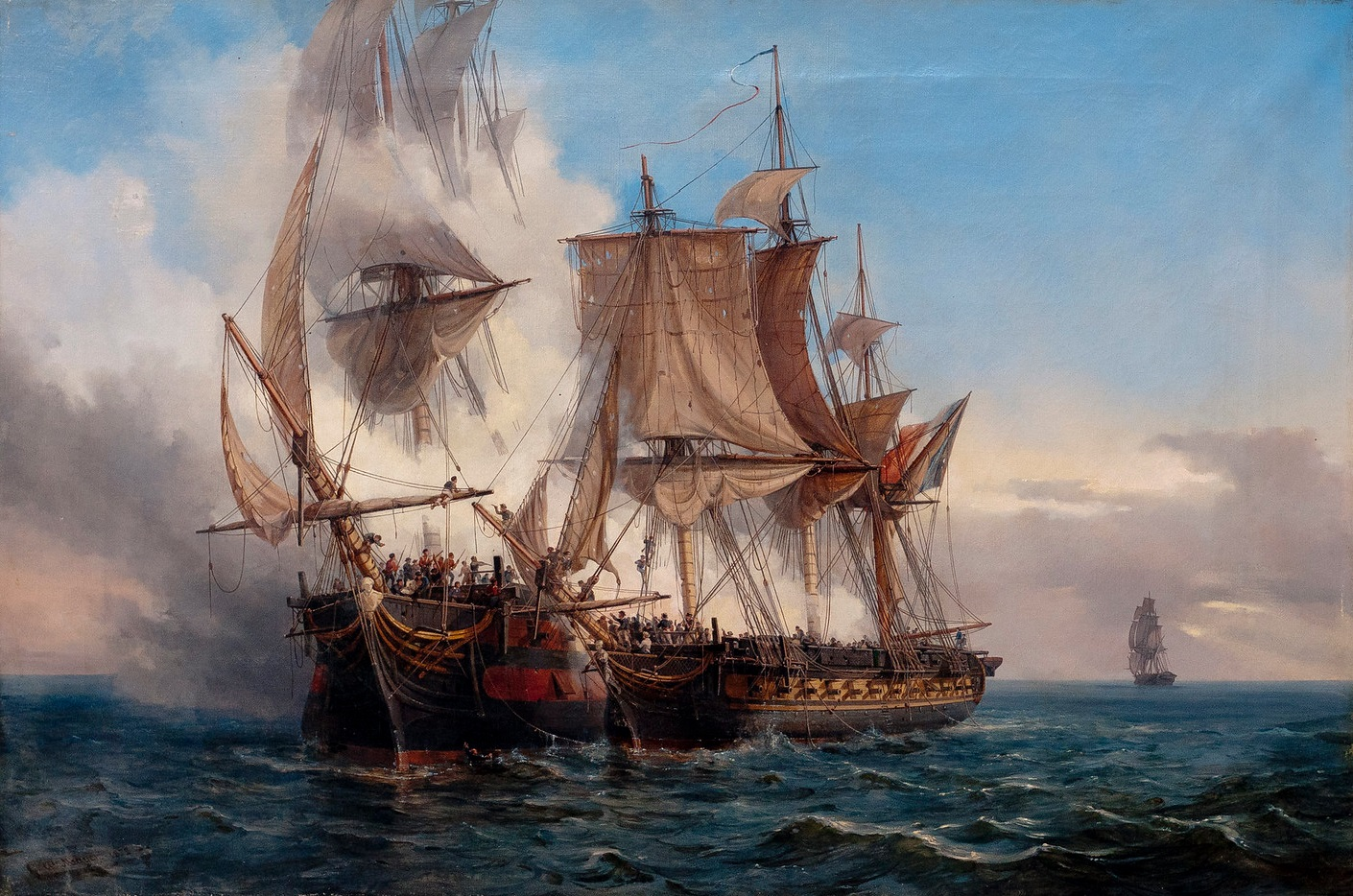
- 1872 painting of Bellone (right) capturing Lord Nelson on 14 August 1803 by Auguste Étienne François Mayer

History

France
- Name: Bellone
- Builder: Bordeaux
- Launched: 1797
- Commissioned: November 1799
- Captured: On 9 July 1806 by the Royal Navy

United Kingdom
- Name: HMS Bellona
- Acquired: Captured on 9 July 1806
- Renamed: HMS Blanche in February 1808
- Fate: Broken up in 1814

General characteristics
- Class & type: 28-gun sixth rate frigate
- Tons burthen: 64285/94 bm
- Length: 132 ft (40.2 m) (gundeck); 107 ft 2 in (32.7 m) (keel)
- Beam: 33 ft 7 in (10.2 m)
- Depth of hold: 11 ft 4 in (3.5 m)
- Sail plan: Full-rigged ship
- Complement: 1799:220; 1799:240; 1801:200
- Armament: 1799:24 × 8-pounder guns + 6 × 36-pounder obusiers de vaisseau; 1799:26 × 12-oiybder guns +4 × 32-pounder carronades; 1801:32 × 8-pounder long guns

Bellone was a French privateer frigate that cruised under Jacques François Perroud and achieved fame with the capture of large East Indiaman Lord Nelson on 14 August 1803. HMS Powerful captured her during the action of 9 July 1806. The British Royal Navy took her into service as HMS Bellona. Later, the Navy renamed her HMS Blanche. She was broken up in 1814.

== Career ==
=== French privateer ===
Bellone was designed as a powerful privateer and was launched at Bordeaux in 1797. She was commissioned (or recommissioned) in November 1797 and under the command of one Pierre or Michel Destebetcho.

==== Atlantic ====
On 24 October Bellone encountered the American merchantman Washington at 48°30′N 8°50′W. Bellone attacked although Washington hoisted American colours. (This may have been a consequence of the Quasi-War.) The vessels exchanged fire over a four-hour period, including more than two hours of intense combat, with the result that both vessels sustained extensive damage to masts, sails, and rigging. Washington lost one man killed and had two men wounded. She went into Lisbon for repairs. There she found out that on the 27th or the 28th, Bellone had come into A Coruña for repairs after having unsuccessfully attacked an American ship. Bellone had suffered 37 dead and 28 wounded. The casualty disparity is surprising as Washington never was able to deploy more than 23 guns and had only 62 crew, whereas Bellona had twenty-six brass 12-pounder guns and four 32-pounder carronades, and 240 men. Two of Washington's 6-pounder guns were unavailable (one was stowed and one was foul), and in an initial exchange of broadsides, recoil dismounted five or six carronades; these the crew were able to remount during a lull in the engagement. However, throughout the engagement Bellona fired at Washington's rigging, while Washington fired at Bellona's hull.

As the merchant ship Monarch, Davidson, master, was sailing to England from Quebec with a cargo of wood, on 16 September 1800 she encountered Bellone, which captured her. However, four days later, HMS Immortalite recaptured Monarch, of 645 tons (bm), and sent her into Plymouth.

==== Indian Ocean ====
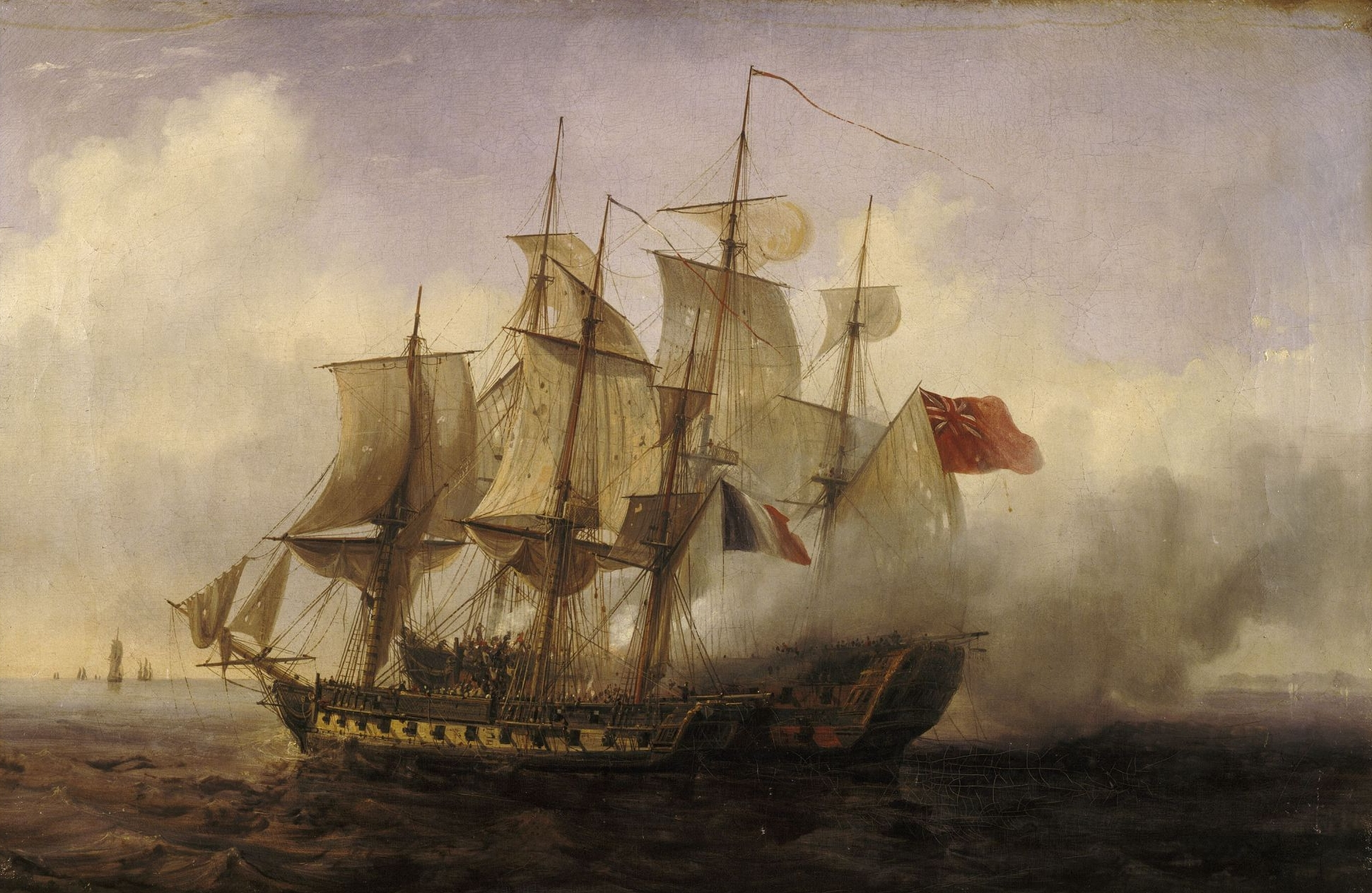
Capture of Lord Nelson by Bellone on 14 August 1803.

Bellone operated from Ile de France from 1801.

In April 1801 she sailed on a cruize under the command of Jacques François Perroud. On his cruise he captured Amboina, Porcher, Tay, Saleh, John, Traveed, Farquhar, Mage, Pedro, and Farquhar. On 3 April 1802 she returned to Port Louis. Farquhar had arrived the day before. Farquhar had a cargo of saltpetre, rice, cotton, sugar, indigo, Madeira wine, and muslin.

On 9 August 1803, Bellone captured Diamond as Diamond was returning to England after having delivered slaves to Havana. However, HMS Goliath recaptured Diamond on 12 August and sent her into The Downs.

On 14 August Bellone met the large East Indiaman Lord Nelson and managed to capture her by boarding.

In June 1805 Bellone captured the whaler Coldstream, Dunn, master, in a fight off Saint Helena. Coldstream's crew were landed there.

Bellone captured the whaler Young William near the Cape of Good Hope later in 1805, but gave her up.

On 28 November 1805 Bellone attacked the East Indiaman Admiral Gardner, Captain George Saltwell. Saltwell dressed some of his seamen as soldiers, and rigged anti-boarding nets. In the ensuing single-ship action the French vessel was able to damage Admiral Gardner's rigging and inflict casualties: Admiral Gardner had 10 men wounded, three severely. However, Bellone did not press the attack and by the next day she had disappeared. Bellone's captain later told another EIC captain that he had veered off because he did not wish to risk his vessel being crippled. Bellone had 36 guns and 200 men to Admiral Gardner's 26 guns and 120 men.

In the action of 9 July 1806, the 74-gun ship of the line HMS Powerful attacked Bellone. Bellone attempted to flee for almost two hours, trading shots with the much more potent opponent, before striking her colours. British casualties were two men killed and three wounded; French casualties were one man killed and six or seven men wounded. Perroud was commended for his spirited defence against overwhelming odds; William James, notably, described Perroud's actions as "extraordinary".

=== Royal Navy ship ===
After her capture, Bellone was incorporated in the Royal Navy as HMS Bellona, armed as a sixth-rate frigate of 28 guns.

Bellona was renamed HMS Blanche in 1809.

On 26 July 1810, Blanche, Lieutenant Richard Barton in temporary command, captured the French privateer Confiance at 5°20′N 98°12′E. She was armed with two long 6-pounder guns and some small arms, and had a crew of 30, She had left Île de France in May and had made two or three captures.

== Fate ==
Blanche was disposed of and broken up in 1814.
