= Sprung cart =

Horse-drawn cart

Unsprung carts
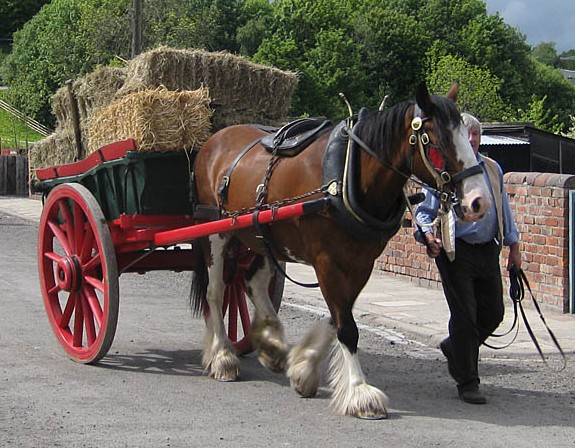
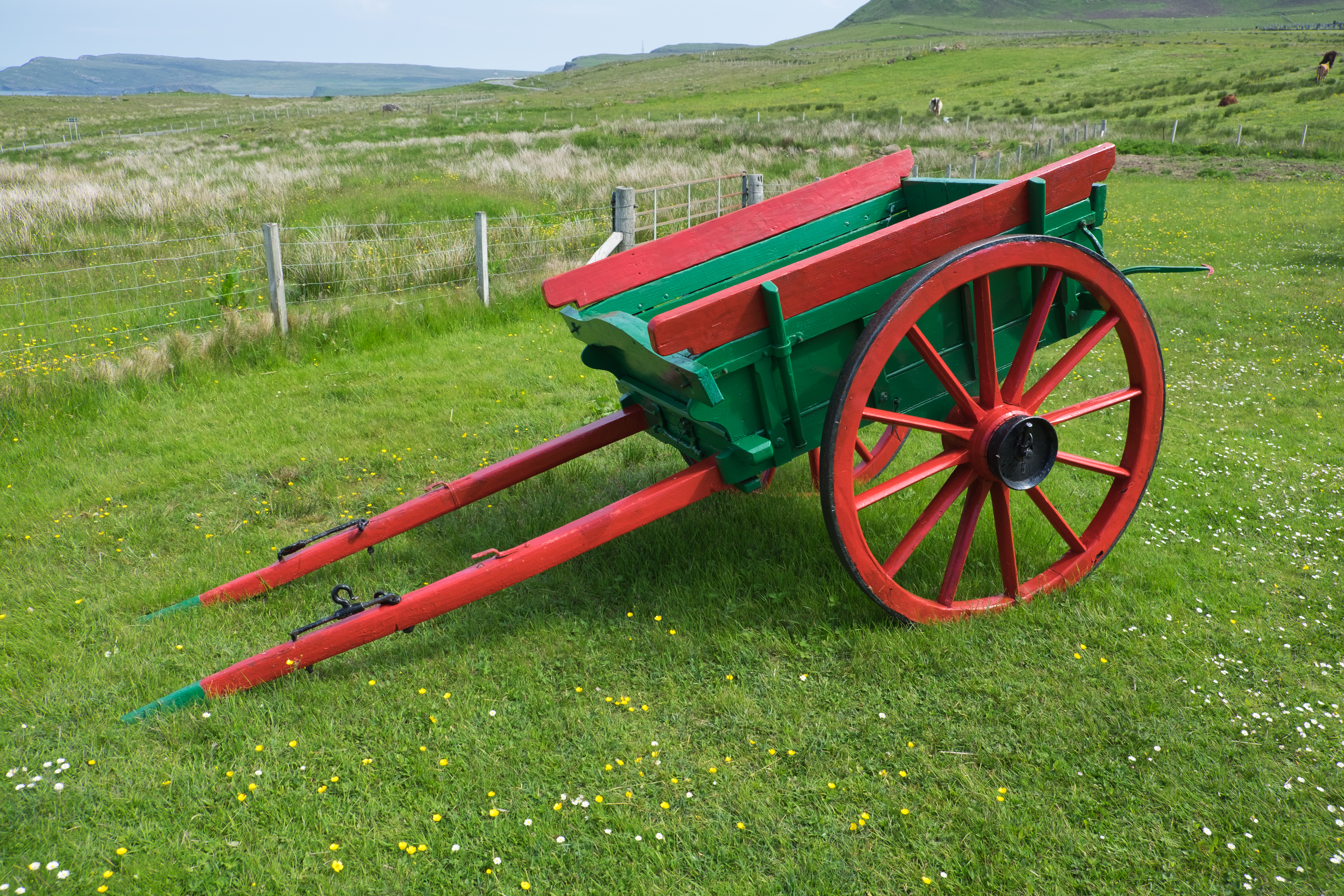
Note that the cart body appears to be resting directly on the axle
Sprung carts
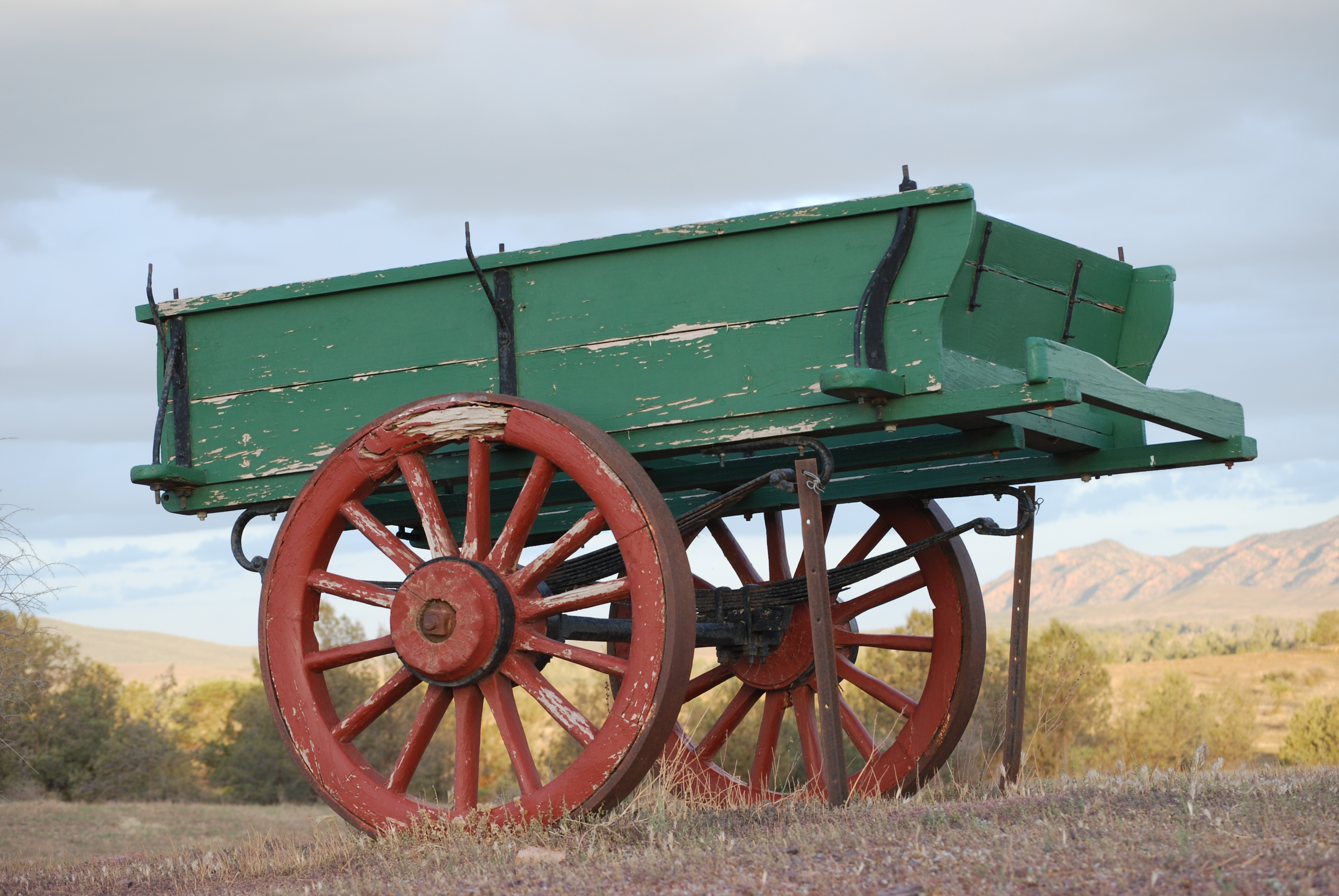
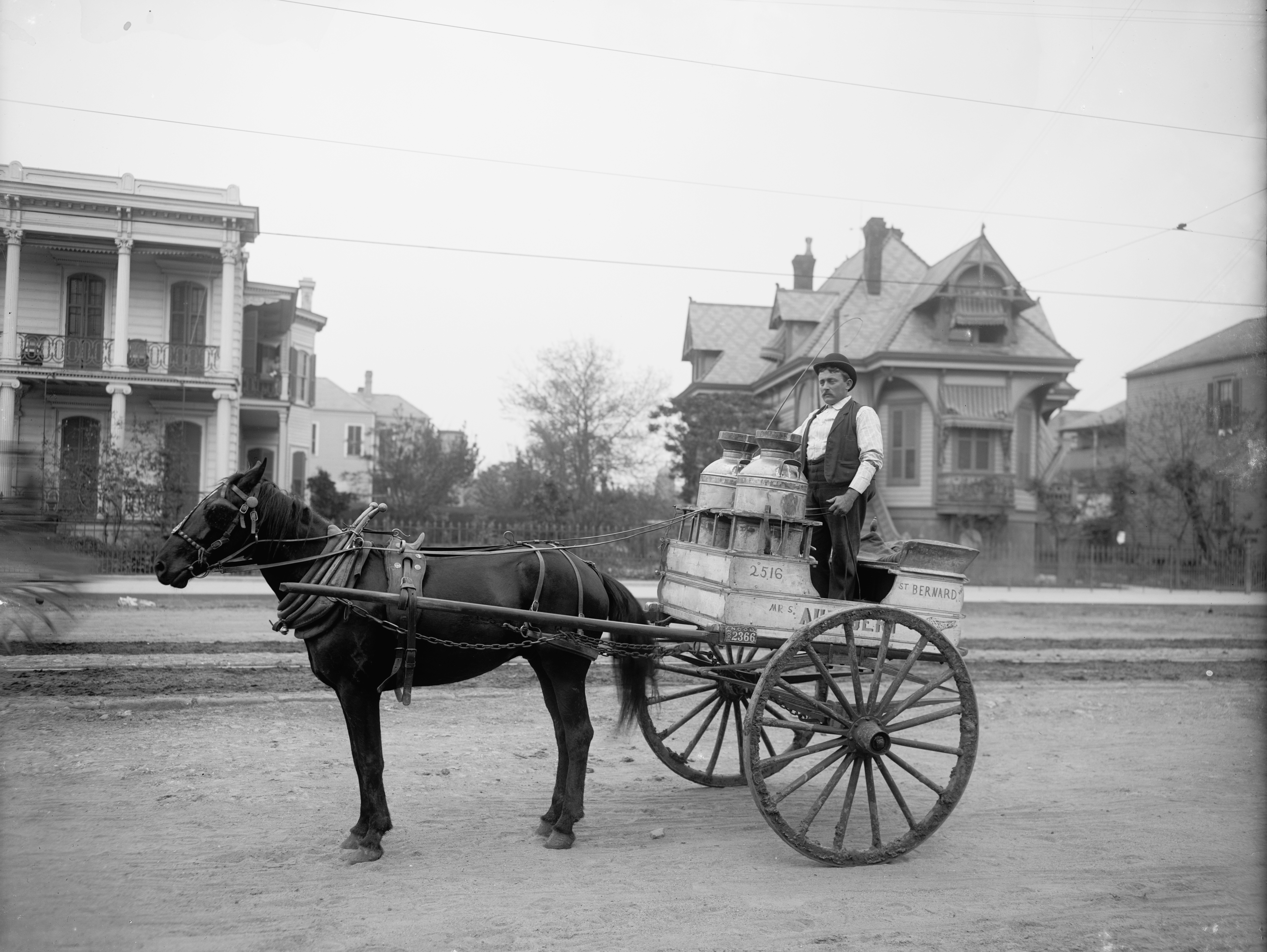
There are metal leaf springs between the body and the axle

Sprung cart and unsprung cart are terms used mainly in Britain and Australia to denote a utilitarian type of two-wheeled horse-drawn cart, and indicating whether or not springs were used to support the body of the cart.

== Overview ==
Unsprung vehicles, meaning without any springs, were simple sturdy two-wheeled vehicle used by roadmen, farmers and tradesmen. They would be used at slower speeds or carrying heavier loads, such as farm carts, those carrying coal or peat, and some heavy delivery vehicles. Farm wagons were usually unsprung, as were most of the freight and dray vehicles such as lorries and trollies. A vehicle without springs was also called a dead axle. The bandy of India is an unsprung cart.

Constructing with springs adds to the cost of the vehicle. A vehicle would be sprung if it was to be used at faster speeds, carrying certain loads, or carrying passengers. Milk floats were usually sprung. The Australian spring cart was a simple cart designed for carrying goods and did not have seating for driver or passengers. Two-wheeled carriages such as gigs and dogcarts were not usually referred to as "carts", though they would be described as "sprung".

Most of the utilitarian carts did not have a seat for the driver. The driver would either stand in the cart, sit on the load, or walk beside the horse. In America, many vehicles had unsprung bodies, but instead were constructed with a sprung driving seat.

Starting in the late-1700s in England, taxes were assessed on horses, wagons, carts, carriages and coaches. Conveyances with springs were taxed as luxury goods, while crude agricultural vehicles were taxed the least, leading to creative vehicle construction to avoid or lessen taxes. The so-called taxed cart was the cheapest and crudest of carts, rating the lowest possible taxed category; it was completely devoid of adornment, springs or cushions, and the owner was required to conspicuously paint their full name on the rear. Jane Austen used a donkey cart made as a miniature gig. Though it utilized springs, because it wasn't pulled by a horse or pony it was not taxed.

== See also ==
- Carriage
- Horse-drawn vehicle
