= Malartic (1799 ship) =

French Ship

History

France
- Name: Malartic
- Namesake: Governor Malartic of Mauritius
- Commissioned: July 1799
- Captured: November 1800

General characteristics
- Tons burthen: 150 (bm)
- Propulsion: Sail
- Complement: 100-120
- Armament: 12 × 8-pounder guns + 2 × 42-pounder carronades

Malartic (or Général Malartic, or General Malartique), was a French privateer ship, famous for her exploits while under the command of Captain Jean-Marie Dutertre. The British captured her in 1800, ending her brief, but productive privateering career.

== Career ==
Malartic was commissioned in July 1799.

She undertook a cruise from July 1799 to March 1800, capturing the former East Indiaman Princess Royal. She also captured the former East Indiaman Thomas, and in the same cruise, the ships Surprise, Joyce, and Lord Hobart. (Note: There is no corroborating evidence that Thomas had ever sailed for the British East India Company.) Malartic arrived back at Mauritius on 9 March.

On 10 September 1799, Général Malartic visited the Seychelles to annul the capitulation by raising the French flag.

On 28 November, Général Malartic captured Surprise near Madras. (Note: Surprize was a galley belonging to the Nawab of Arcot.) Surprize's crew was taken to the Seychelles from where Success, Jean-François Hodoul, master, took them to Mauritius; they arrived on 28 January 1800.

On 6 March (or February), Malartique captured Albion, Smith, master, at 20°24′N 90°0′E. A few days earlier Malartique had captured a vessel belonging to the King of Travancore. The privateer put Smith and his crew aboard the captured vessel after Smith had promised to sail to Tranquebar.

On 22 March, Fataslem, an English ship that Malartic had captured on 25 December 1799, arrived at Mauritius. She was carrying a cargo of "calin", pepper, sago, arrack, etc.

In July 1800, Malartic sailed for a second cruise, capturing the ships Frederic North, Amboyna, Alkias, and Malava. She later captured Governor North (which is almost surely the same vessel as Frederic North, both being named for Governor Frederick North, who served between 1798 and 1805 as the first British civilian governor of Ceylon), (Note: Governor North was a brig of 250 tons (bm), built at Chittagong in 1800, and reported captured. Frederic Nord, captured 2 January 1801, arrived at Mauritius on 11 February with a cargo of cowries. Frederick North became Ville De Lyon.) Marquis de Wellesley, (Note: Name probably translated from English, though it is not clear what vessel this was. Another source gives the name Marquess Wellesley, but this does not shed any more light.) and a brig, before returning to Mauritius, where she arrived with her prizes on 21 September 1800.

Malartic captured Marquis de Wellesley near Visakhapatnam on 10 September. Marquis de Wellesley arrived at Mauritius on 28 October. She was carrying 200,000 livres of wheat, rice, and the like.

Malartic's last capture was Mermaid, Captain Garden, which had been sailing from Calcutta to Rangoon. Dutarte detained her for several days, plundered her, and then permitted her to proceed on her voyage.

Malartic encountered and engaged in an action with the American vessel Rebecca, purchased at Calcutta and sailing for Baltimore under the command of Captain John W. Bronaugh. Rebecca, of about 1000 tons burthen, was armed with eighteen 9-pounder guns and carried a well-armed crew of 85 men. The engagement lasted about 2 hours and 45 minutes before Malartic, much battered in her masts and sails, eventually took to her sweeps to escape. In the action Rebecca had no casualties. Newspaper accounts reported that Malartic had 25 men killed and 16 wounded. (Note: Rebecca may have been the ship that HMS Doris and Psyche captured on 29 May 1809.)

== Capture ==
The East Indiaman Phoenix captured Malartic on 10 November 1800, in the Bay of Bengal at 20°15′N 91°18′E, which is about 200 km SSW of Cox's Bazar. Phoenix was prepared to resist a more formidable opponent. She had her guns double-shotted, and the troops that she was transporting stayed concealed on the poop until Malartic approached to board. At that point Phoenix fired a broadside into Malartic, and the troops revealed themselves. Dutertre immediately struck. The only casualty on Phoenix was a man who suffered a broken leg from the recoil of a carronade. Captain William Moffat of Phoenix reported that Malartic had lost two surgeons, the boatswain, and several crew members killed in the action with Rebecca; Moffat did not report any casualties on Malartic from her encounter with Phoenix.

The British took Dutertre prisoner; he was eventually released under the Treaty of Amiens in 1803. Moffat, master of Phoenix, took General Malartic with him to Bengal. He put a prize crew aboard Malartic and took her crew on board Phoenix where passengers and the officers of the 88th Regiment of Foot traveling on her stood watch over them.

The Court of Directors of the British East India company awarded Moffat 500 guineas and the officers and crew of Phoenix £2000 to be divided among them for "their gallant conduct in engaging and capturing the ship General Malartic."
