= William Moffat (MP) =

British banker, merchant and politician

William Moffat (7 March 1737 – 12 January 1822) was a British banker, merchant and politician.

He was involved in several banking partnerships in London, and was also a merchant. By 1790 he lived in Bloomsbury, and in 1799 he bought the Painshill estate in Surrey, but sold it a few years later and lived in Wimbledon. In 1811, as a managing owner of East India Company ships, his business address is given as 27, Nicholas Lane. In 1819, it is 21, Birchin Lane.

He was elected at the 1802 general election as a Member of Parliament (MP) for the rotten borough of Winchelsea in Sussex, but was not re-elected in 1806. According to Hansard he made no contributions as an MP.

== East India Company ships ==
William Moffat is listed as the owner of ships sailing on behalf of the East India Company from 1781 to 1833. Many sailed from Portsmouth, to destinations including India and China.

The Supplement to a Register of Ships Employed in the Service of the ... East India Company from 1760 to the Conclusion of the Commercial Charter, 1835 lists ships owned by William Moffat after he died in 1822. The majority of his estate went to his son, William Moffat, Jnr. The Supplement lists a company associated with the Winchelsea and Charles Grant: Messrs Moffat and Burnie. William Burnie was surgeon on some of William Moffat's ships and one of the executors of William Moffat's will.

== Family ==
William Moffat's parents were John Moffat (1676–1742) and Margaret Moffat née Inglis. He married Elizabeth Bowland (c1737-1791), c1766. She died on 13 January 1791. On 31 December 1795, he married Elizabeth Harington (1771–1843).

He had three children by his first wife, Elizabeth Bowland: Elizabeth Moffat (1771–1799), William Moffat, Jnr (1774–1851) and Margaret Thorold Moffat (1775–1794).

He was buried in Bath Abbey on 21 January 1822.

=== Family tree ===
Margaret Inglis; 1700–1782	John Moffat; 1676–1742
James Moffat; 1733–1788	John Moffat; 1735–1791	William Moffat MP; 1737–1822
Capt. William Moffat; 1774–1850	William Moffat, Jnr; 1774–1851

This only shows members of the family discussed below.

=== William Moffat, Jnr (1774–1851) ===
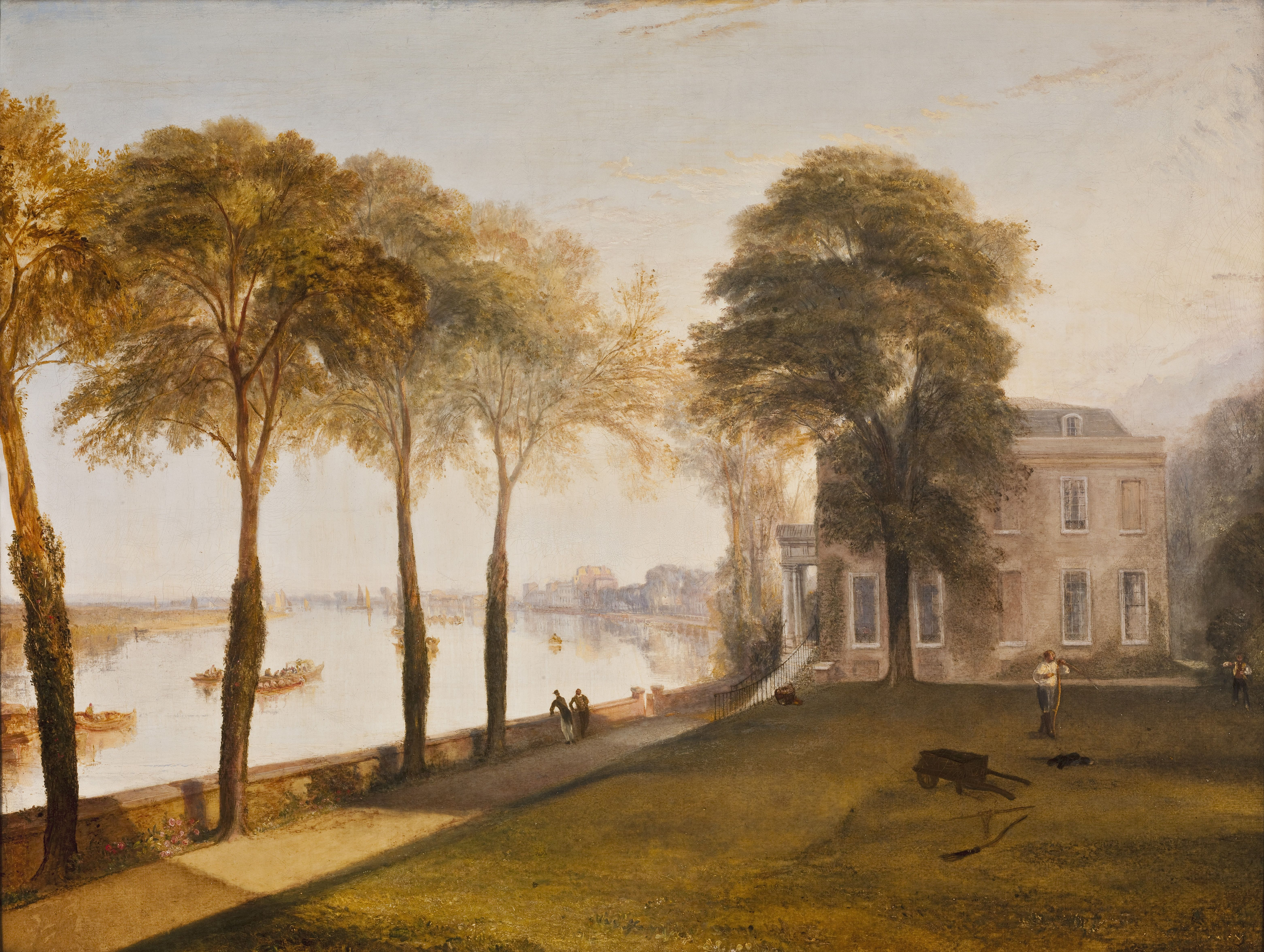
Mortlake Terrace: Early Summer Morning by Turner, 1826

William Moffat, Jnr married twice: Ann Palmer (c1774-1805), daughter of Charles Palmer of Thurnscoe Hall in 1797 and, in 1807, Jane Wheatley (1783–1858) In all, he had 19 (possibly 21) children. Many are mentioned in William Moffat, MP's will. He died on 25 August 1851 in Weymouth and was buried in Mortlake on 2 September 1851.

All his children from 1814 to 1824 were born in Mortlake, Surrey. Surrey Land Tax records list William Moffat at Mortlake, from 1813 to 1831. The property details show him renting a "Large house and garden, coach house and stable" and "a meadow opposite the house". There are memorials to the Moffat family in St Mary the Virgin, Mortlake.

In 1826, J M W Turner exhibited a painting, The Seat of William Moffatt Esq., at Mortlake. Early (Summer’s) Morning

William Moffat's eldest son, William Palmer Moffat (1797–1833) married Frances Pearson (c1797-1868), daughter of William Pearson (1767–1847), one of the founders of the Royal Astronomical Society. William Palmer Moffat sailed on the East Indiaman Duke of York, 31 December 1817 – 4 May 1819, (Bombay and China). He married Frances Pearson on 2 June 1819. He died in Bruges in January 1833.

=== Captain William Moffat (1774–1850) ===
Voyages of ships owned by William Moffat, with William Moffat as captain.

Ship name	Destination	Date	Page in 1820 Register	Notes
Lord Thurlow	Coast and Bay	24 May 1795 – 7 August 1796	171	Captain: William Thomson; 3rd Mate: William Moffat
Phoenix	Bengal and Bombay	27 May 1800 – 11 June 1802	203	Commander. On 10 November 1800, Phoenix captured the French privateer Malartic. While in Kolkata, in 1800, he commissioned a memorial to his father, James.
Ganges	China	6 May 1803 – 15 August 1804	228	Involved in the Battle of Pulo Aura, 14 February 1804.
Winchelsea	Bombay and China	4 March 1806 – 3 July 1807	250	Name of William Moffat, MP's constituency
Winchelsea	Bombay and China	9 February 1808 – 12 September 1809	267	1811: Captain William Moffat, "of the Winchelsea", married Sarah Money.
Winchelsea	Madras and China	1 March 1812 – 8 June 1813	301	
Winchelsea	Madras and China	22 February 1814 – 25 June 1815	318	
Scaleby Castle	China	17 April 1816 – 7 June 1817	336	The 1820 Register lists this ship as belonging to William Moffaft, However, according to Rowan Hackman's, Ships of the East India Company, 2001, the East India Company purchased the ship outright from William Moffat in 1816. She made 10 subsequent voyages for the company from 1816 to 1834.

Because Captain William Moffat sailed on East India Company ships owned by William Moffat, MP, there has been some confusion, sometimes resulting in them being thought to be one person. In fact, they were uncle and nephew. As stated above, William Moffat, MP's father was John Moffat (1676–1742). The memorial in Kolkata (below) shows that Captain William Moffat's father was James Moffat (1733–1788).

Captain William Moffat was born on 5 April 1774, in Rochester, Kent. He was the son of William Moffat, MP's brother, James, who died in India in 1788. William Moffat erected a memorial to James Moffat, and James' brother John, in South Park Street Cemetery, Kolkata in 1800 while Captain of the Phoenix. The ship sailed from Torbay on 27 May 1800 and returned to moorings on 11 June 1802. At the time, the Phoenix was owned by William Moffat, MP.

He married Sarah Money on 23 December 1811 in Walthamstow, Essex. The Naval Chronicle: listed their marriage: "Captain William Moffat, of the Hon. Company's ship, Winchelsea, to Miss Sarah Money, daughter of the late William Money, Esq.".

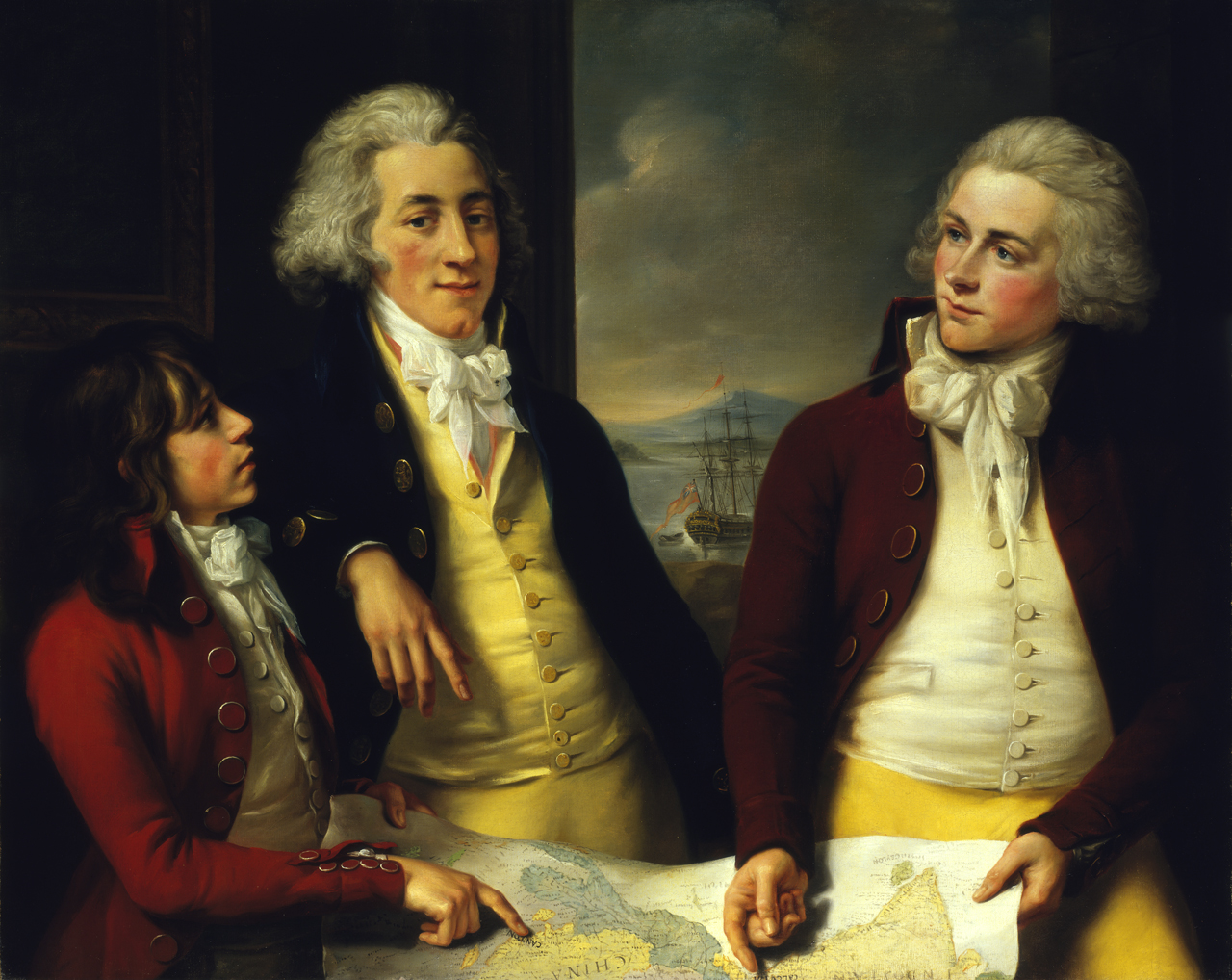
The Money Brothers (John Francis Rigaud, c. 1792). William Taylor Money is the figure in the centre.

Sarah Money was the sister of William Taylor Money (1769–1834). William Taylor Money sailed on William Moffat MP's ship Rose twice: on her first voyage, from 21 February 1787 to 22 June 1788, as 4th Mate and her second voyage, from 6 March 1789 to 26 April 1790, as 2nd Mate. Rose is in the background of the painting The Money Brothers by John Francis Rigaud, now at the National Maritime Museum, Greenwich.

William Moffat died on 14 September 1850, in Kensington, Middlesex.

==== Captain William Moffat – Memorials ====
James and John Moffat, Kolkata
In Memory of James Moffat,
Surgeon of the "Phoenix," East Indiaman,
who departed this life October 31, A. D. 1788,
aged 55 years.

Also of Mr. John Moffat, brother to the above.
who died A. D. 1791, aged 56 years.

This humble tomb is erected by William Moffat
son of the above named James Moffat, who com-
manded the "Phoenix" at this port in the year 1800.

Captain William Moffat in St Margaret's Church, Rochester
SACRED TO THE MEMORY OF
WILLIAM MOFFAT ESQ.
OF HARPERTON, ROXBURGHSHIRE
A NATIVE OF THIS PLACE AND FORMERLY
A COMMANDER IN THE H.E.I.C. MARITIME SERVICE
WHO DIED AT KENSINGTON ON THE 14th SEPTEMBER 1850
AGED 76 YEARS

=== Harington family ===
William Moffat's second wife, Elizabeth Harington (1771–1843) had two brothers: James Eyre Harington (1774–1836) and Thomas Talbot Harington (1780–1841).

James Eyre Harington was Purser on William Moffat's ship the Ganges on a voyage to St Helena, Bencoolen and China from 5 June 1797 to 10 February 1799. He married Captain William Moffat's sister, Margaret Moffat on 12 December 1799. He was rector of Sapcote, Leicester and Chalbury, Dorset. He was one of the executors of William Moffat's will in 1822.

Thomas Talbot Harington (1780–1841) was one of the captains on William Moffat's ships. After the Ganges was lost in May 1807, Captain William Moffat wrote to William Moffat, MP requesting that Thomas Talbot Harington be paid for the voyage.

Parliament of the United Kingdom
Preceded by William Devaynes; William Currie	Member of Parliament for Winchelsea; 1802–1806; With: Robert Ladbroke	Succeeded by Calverley Bewicke; Sir Frederick Fletcher-Vane, Bt
