= List of shipwrecks in February 1841 =

The list of shipwrecks in February 1841 includes ships sunk, foundered, wrecked, grounded, or otherwise lost during February 1841.

== 1 February ==
List of shipwrecks: 1 February 1841
Ship	State	Description
Christian	United Kingdom	The sloop was wrecked at the mouth of the River Tay. Her crew were rescued by the Dundee Lifeboat.
Criterion	United Kingdom	The ship was driven ashore at Arklow, County Wicklow. Her crew were rescued. She was on a voyage from Dublin to Arklow and Newcastle upon Tyne, Northumberland.
Elton	United Kingdom	The ship was wrecked on the Haisborough Sands, in the North Sea off the coast of Norfolk. Her crew were rescued.
Jane	United Kingdom	The ship was wrecked at Drogheda, County Louth with the loss of all hands. She was on a voyage from Troon, Ayrshire to Dublin.
Ocean	United Kingdom	The ship ran aground on the North Bull, in the Irish Sea. She was refloated and taken into Dublin. Ocean was on a voyage from Cardiff, Glamorgan to Dundalk, County Louth.
Reaper	United Kingdom	The ship was driven wrecked on the Hook Sand, in the English Channel off the coast of Dorset. Her crew were rescued. She was on a voyage from Newcastle upon Tyne, Northumberland to Poole, Dorset.

== 2 February ==
List of shipwrecks: 2 February 1841
Ship	State	Description
Achilles	United Kingdom	The ship ran aground in the Clyde between "Dunglass" and Dumbarton. She was on a voyage from Glasgow, Renfrewshire to Liverpool, Lancashire.
Elizabeth	United Kingdom	The ship was holed by ice and sank off Texel, North Holland, Netherlands. Her crew were rescued. She was on a voyage from Ipswich, Suffolk to Medemblik, North Holland.
Risk	United Kingdom	The whaler, a barque, was wrecked in the Maldive Islands. Her crew were rescued.

== 3 February ==
List of shipwrecks: 3 February 1841
Ship	State	Description
Fearney	United Kingdom	The sloop foundered off Burntisland, Fife with the loss of both crew. She was on a voyage from Burntisland to Granton, Lothian.

== 4 February ==
List of shipwrecks: 4 February 1841
Ship	State	Description
Earl of Devon	United Kingdom	The ship struck rocks off Black Head, Cornwall and foundered 2 nautical miles (3.7 km) south south east of Penzance. Her crew were rescued. She was on a voyage from Exeter, Devon to Newport, Monmouthshire. Earl of Devon was refloated on 11 August 1842 and taken into Penzance.
Emilie	United Kingdom	The ship was wrecked on Brier Island, Nova Scotia, British North America.
Joshua Sears	United States	The ship ran aground off Bermuda and was severely damaged. She was on a voyage from Philadelphia, Pennsylvania to Barbados. Joshua Sears was refloated and taken into Hamilton, Bermuda.
Vernon	United Kingdom	The ship was last sighted on this date whilst on a voyage from New Orleans, Louisiana, United States to Cowes, Isle of Wight. Presumed subsequently foundered with the loss of all hands.
William and Haldimend	United Kingdom	The ship ran aground on the Middle Sand, in the North Sea off the coast of Essex and foundered. Her crew were rescued. She was on a voyage from London to Ipswich, Suffolk.

== 5 February ==
List of shipwrecks: 5 February 1841
Ship	State	Description
Boreas	United Kingdom	The ship departed from Liverpool, Lancashire for Exeter, Devon. No further trace, presumed foundered with the loss of all hands.
Dasher	(United Kingdom of Great Britain and Ireland) Isle of Man	The smack was driven ashore and wrecked at Derbyhaven Her crew were rescued. She was on a voyage from Whitehaven, Cumberland to Derbyhaven.
William Tell	United States	The brig was driven ashore and wrecked at Mogador, Morocco with the loss of two of her crew. Survivors were rescued by Volage (French Navy).

== 6 February ==
List of shipwrecks: 6 February 1841
Ship	State	Description
Vulcan	United Kingdom	The ship was driven ashore by ice on Saltholm, Denmark. She was on a voyage from Memel, Prussia to Hull, Yorkshire. Vulcan was later refloated.
Zenobia	France	The ship ran aground at Maranhão, Brazil. She was on a voyage from Marseille, Bouches-du-Rhône to Maranhão.

== 7 February ==
List of shipwrecks: 7 February 1841
Ship	State	Description
Ann Emma	United Kingdom	The ship ran aground in Loch Indaal. She was on a voyage from Newcastle upon Tyne, Northumberland to Liverpool, Lancashire. Ann Emma was later refloated.

== 8 February ==
List of shipwrecks: 8 February 1841
Ship	State	Description
Jeune Emelie	France	The ship was wrecked near Audierne, Finistère. She was on a voyage from Nantes, Loire-Inférieure to Jersey, Channel Islands.
Prosper	United Kingdom	The ship foundered off Islandmagee, County Antrim with the loss of five of her crew. She was on a voyage from Glasgow, Renfrewshire to London.
Sceptre	United Kingdom	The ship sank at Bridlington, Yorkshire. She was on a voyage from Hartlepool, County Durham to London.

== 9 February ==
List of shipwrecks: 9 February 1841
Ship	State	Description
Dahlia	United Kingdom	The ship ran aground on the Bimar Rock, in the Firth of Forth. She was on a voyage from Glasgow, Renfrewshire to Aberdeen. She was refloated on 12 February and resumed her voyage.
Elizabeth	United States	The ship departed from Philadelphia, Pennsylvania, United States for Bremen. No further trace, presumed foundered with the loss of all hands.
St. Ives	United Kingdom	The ship was wrecked at St. Ubes, Portugal. Her crew were rescued.

== 10 February ==
List of shipwrecks: 10 February 1841
Ship	State	Description
Marie Rollandine	France	The ship was abandoned in the Atlantic Ocean off the Isles of Scilly, United Kingdom. She was on a voyage from Rouen, Seine-Inférieure to Nantes, Loire-Inférieure.
Susan Maria	United Kingdom	The brig was driven ashore and wrecked at Ballyshannon, County Donegal. She was on a voyage from Ardrossan, Ayrshire to Donegal.

== 11 February ==
List of shipwrecks: 11 February 1841
Ship	State	Description
Adelaide	United Kingdom	The ship was wrecked on Anglesey. Her crew were rescued. She was on a voyage from the Charente to Liverpool, Lancashire.
Billow	United States	The ship was driven ashore at Patchogue, New York, United States. She was on a voyage from La Rochelle, Charente-Maritime, France to New York City.
Estafette	Portugal	The ship was wrecked at St. Ubes. Her crew were rescued.
Planet	United Kingdom	The ship was abandoned in the Atlantic Ocean off Vila do Conde, Portugal. Her crew were rescued. She was on a voyage from A Coruña, Spain to Porto, Portugal.
William Allen and Brock	United Kingdom	The ship was driven ashore on the Isle of Grain, Kent. She was refloated the next day and proceeded on her voyage.

== 12 February ==
List of shipwrecks: 12 February 1841
Ship	State	Description
British Lady	United Kingdom	The ship was wrecked at "Chimlico", British Honduras. Her crew were rescued.
Darlington	United Kingdom	The schooner was driven ashore at Flamborough Head, Yorkshire. She was on a voyage from London to Stockton-on-Tees, County Durham. She was refloated and resumed her voyage.
Hope	United Kingdom	The ship was in collision with another vessel and sank in the North Sea off Whitby, Yorkshire. She was on a voyage from South Shields, County Durham to London.
Margaret	United Kingdom	The ship ran aground on the Forty-nine Bank, off Berbice, British Honduras.
Memphis	United States	The ship was wrecked near New York. She was on a voyage from New Orleans, Louisiana to New York.
Jean	United Kingdom	The ship was wrecked 12 nautical miles (22 km) south of Campbeltown, Argyllshire. Her crew were rescued. She was on a voyage from Dublin to Saltcoats, Ayrshire.
Shakspeare	United Kingdom	The brig was driven ashore and damaged at Kelderstell, Yorkshire. She was refloated the next day and put into South Shields, County Durham.
Topaz	United States	The ship departed from Boston, Massachusetts for Rotterdam, South Holland, Netherlands. No further trace, presumed foundered with the loss of all hands.

== 13 February ==
List of shipwrecks: 13 February 1841
Ship	State	Description
Claudine	Netherlands	The ship was driven ashore at Cap Gris Nez, Pas-de-Calais, France. She was on a voyage from Batavia, Netherlands East Indies to Amsterdam, North Holland. She was later refloated.
Hectorine	United Kingdom	The ship was driven ashore at Kirkcudbright, Wigtownshire. She was on a voyage from Dundalk, County Louth to Glasson Dock, Lancashire. Hectorine was refloated on 18 February.
John Watson	United Kingdom	The ship ran aground on the Trinity Sand, in the North Sea and was damaged. She was on a voyage from Hull, Yorkshire to Leith, Lothian. John Watson was refloated and resumed her voyage.
Mary Anne	United Kingdom	The sloop ran aground on the Horse Shoe Bank, in the English Channel. She was on a voyage from Shoreham-by-Sea, Sussex to Runcorn, Cheshire. Mary Anne was refloated on 20 February and taken into Teignmouth, Devon for repairs.
Robert and Henry Allan	United Kingdom	The brig was driven ashore near Flamborough Head, Yorkshire. She was on a voyage from London to Hartlepool, County Durham. She was refloated and resumed her voyage.
Rose	United Kingdom	The ship was in collision with Miranda ( United Kingdom) off São Miguel Island, Azores and was abandoned by her crew. She subsequently drove ashore on the island and was wrecked.
Siluria	United Kingdom	The ship ran aground and sank in Wigton Bay. Her crew were rescued.
Swift	United Kingdom	The smack was run down and sunk in the Irish Sea off The Skerries, Anglesey. Her crew were rescued by Rival ( United Kingdom).

== 14 February ==
List of shipwrecks: 14 February 1841
Ship	State	Description
Castor	Russian Empire	The ship was driven ashore and wrecked at Atherstone, Isle of Wight, United Kingdom with the loss of three of her crew. She was on a voyage from St. Ubes, Portugal to Stavanger, Norway.
Heroine	United Kingdom	The East Indiaman was wrecked near Cap Spartel, Morocco with the loss of 34 of the 60 people on board. She was on a voyage from Calcutta, India to London.
Robert	United Kingdom	The ship ran aground at Flamborough Head, Yorkshire. She was on a voyage from London to Hartlepool, County Durham. Robert was refloated and resumed her voyage.
Sceptre	United Kingdom	The brig departed from Cork for Galway. She subsequently foundered with the loss of all hands.

== 15 February ==
List of shipwrecks: 15 February 1841
Ship	State	Description
Courier	Hamburg	The ship ran aground off Neuwerk. She was on a voyage from Messina, Sicily to Hamburg. Courier was refloated the next day and take into Cuxhaven.
Mary and Elizabeth	United Kingdom	The ship ran aground on The Skerries, Anglesey. She was on a voyage from China to Liverpool, Lancashire. She was refloated on 24 January and taken into Holyhead, Anglesey.

== 17 February ==
List of shipwrecks: 17 February 1841
Ship	State	Description
Hector	United Kingdom	The ship foundered in the Atlantic Ocean off Terceira Island, Azores with the loss of three of her crew. She was on a voyage from Calcutta, India to Liverpool, Lancashire.

== 18 February ==
List of shipwrecks: 18 February 1841
Ship	State	Description
Marathon	United Kingdom	The brig sprang a leak and foundered in the North Sea off Robin Hoods Bay, Yorkshire. Her crew survived. She was on a voyage from Newcastle upon Tyne, Northumberland to London.
Prince of Waterloo	United Kingdom	The ship ran aground at Belfast, County Antrim. She was refloated on 20 February.

== 20 February ==
List of shipwrecks: 20 February 1841
Ship	State	Description
Governor Fenner	United States	The ship collided with Nottingham ( United Kingdom) and foundered in the Irish Sea off Holyhead, Anglesey, United Kingdom with the loss of 120 of the 122 people on board. She was on a voyage from Liverpool, Lancashire, United Kingdom to New York. Nottingham was severely damaged. She was on a voyage from Dublin to Liverpool. She was subsequently towed into the River Mersey.
Percival Foster	United Kingdom	The ship ran aground near Redcar, Yorkshire. She was refloated and taken into Hartlepool, County Durham.

== 21 February ==
List of shipwrecks: 21 February 1841
Ship	State	Description
Alice	United Kingdom	The ship ran aground and was damaged on the Blackwater Bank, in the Irish Sea off the coast of County Wexford. She was on a voyage from Barbados to Liverpool, Lancashire. Her passengers were taken off by Royal Adelaide ( United Kingdom). Alice was later refloated.
Columbia	Hamburg	The ship departed from Matanzas, Cuba for Hamburg. No further trace, presumed foundered with the loss of all hands.

== 22 February ==
List of shipwrecks: 22 February 1841
Ship	State	Description
British Oak	United Kingdom	The ship ran aground on the Goodwin Sands, Kent. She was on a voyage from Newcastle upon Tyne, Northumberland to Portsmouth, Hampshire. British Oak was refloated and taken into The Downs.
Liberty	United Kingdom	The ship was driven ashore at Rye, Sussex. She was on a voyage from Teignmouth, Devon to Hull, Yorkshire. Liberty was refloated and resumed her voyage.
Thames	United Kingdom	The convict ship capsized in the River Thames at Deptford, Kent. She was righted the next day.
Undaunted	United Kingdom	The ship ran aground at St Combs Head, Aberdeenshire. She was on a voyage from New Brunswick, British North America to Alloa, Clackmannanshire.

== 23 February ==
List of shipwrecks: 23 February 1841
Ship	State	Description
Armadillo	United Kingdom	The ship capsized at Cowes, Isle of Wight. She was righted the next day.
Friends	United Kingdom	The brig ran aground on the Cockle Sand, in the North Sea off the coast of Norfolk. She was refloated.
Juliana	United Kingdom	The ship ran aground on the Goodwin Sands, Kent. She was on a voyage from Sunderland, County Durham to Calais, France. Juliana was refloated and resumed her voyage.

== 24 February ==
List of shipwrecks: 24 February 1841
Ship	State	Description
Catherina	Hamburg	The ship was sunk by ice near Cuxhaven.
Johanne	Hamburg	The ship was sunk by ice near Cuxhaven.
Mary	United Kingdom	The schooner was holed by an anchor and sank in Bugsby's Hole, in the River Thames at Blackwall, Middlesex. Her crew survived. She was on a voyage from Selby, Yorkshire to London.
Zephyr	United Kingdom	The ship was driven ashore in the Scheldt. She was on a voyage from Antwerp, Belgium to Hull, Yorkshire.

== 25 February ==
List of shipwrecks: 25 February 1841
Ship	State	Description
Apollo	United Kingdom	The ship ran aground on the Haisborough Sands, in the North Sea off the coast of Norfolk and was abandoned by her crew. She was on a voyage from Rotterdam, South Holland, Netherlands to Hull, Yorkshire. She subsequently became a wreck.
Ardwell	United Kingdom	The ship was abandoned in the North Sea off Lowestoft, Suffolk. Her crew were rescued. She was subsequently towed into Harwich, Essex by HMS Blazer (Royal Navy).

== 26 February ==
List of shipwrecks: 26 February 1841
Ship	State	Description
Amelia	United Kingdom	The brig was wrecked on the Herne Sand, in the North Sea off Reculver, Kent. All nine people on board were rescued. She was on a voyage from London to Liverpool, Lancashire. Amelia was refloated on 26 March with the assistance of six smacks and towed into Whitstable, Kent.
Gratitude	United Kingdom	The ship collided with Volant ( United Kingdom) and foundered in the North Sea off the coast of Kent.
Kate	United Kingdom	The ship was driven ashore south of Black Castle, Wicklow. She was on a voyage from Runcorn, Cheshire to Wicklow.
London	United Kingdom	The ship ran aground on the Quern Sand, in the North Sea off the coast of Kent. She was on a voyage from South Shields, County Durham to Sandwich, Kent. She was later refloated and resumed her voyage.
Mary	United Kingdom	The ship ran aground on the Gunfleet Sand, in the North Sea off the coast of Essex. She was refloated and taken into Sheerness, Kent.

== 27 February ==
List of shipwrecks: 27 February 1841
Ship	State	Description
Cambridge	Imperial Chinese Navy	Cambridge′'s (left) ammunition magazine detonating. First Opium War: Battle of First Bar: The 34-gun sailing vessel, a former East Indiaman, was badly damaged by Royal Navy warships on the Pearl River near First Bar Island in Canton Province and was captured by the sixth rate HMS Calliope (Royal Navy). Calliope′s crew set Cambridge on fire, and she exploded when the flames reached her ammunition magazine.
Hillsborough	United Kingdom	The ship was wrecked on the Formby Bank, in Liverpool Bay. Her crew were rescued. She was on a voyage from Donaghadee, County Down to Liverpool, Lancashire.
Intrepido	United Kingdom	The ship was abandoned in the Atlantic Ocean. Her crew were rescued by Bache ( United Kingdom). Intrepido was on a voyage from Sierra Leone to London.
John	United Kingdom	The ship was wrecked on the Silver Keys. Her crew were rescued. She was on a voyage from Halifax, Nova Scotia, British North America to Jamaica.

== 28 February ==
List of shipwrecks: 28 February 1841
Ship	State	Description
Acasta	United States	The ship foundered in the Atlantic Ocean 50 nautical miles (93 km) off the American coast.
Beatitude	United Kingdom	The ship was in collision with the brig Volant ( United Kingdom) and foundered in the North Sea off the coast of Kent. Her crew were rescued by Volant.
Constance	Hamburg	The ship ran aground at the mouth of the Elbe. She was on a voyage from Havana, Cuba to Hamburg. Constance was later refloated and taken into Cuxhaven.
Druid	United Kingdom	The full-rigged ship sprang a leak and was abandoned in the Indian Ocean 200 nautical miles (370 km) off Fort Dauphin, Madagascar. All on board survived. She was on a voyage from Sydney, New South Wales to London.
Shannon	United Kingdom	The ship was driven into by Robert Browne (United States) and sank at Savannah, Georgia, United States.
Sulimony	(United Kingdom of Great Britain and Ireland)	The barque caught fire on 28 February 1841 off Kidderpore Dockyard, Calcutta, India. The fire had begun among some bales of cotton and was soon subdued; arson was not suspected.
Tasmanian Lass	(United Kingdom of Great Britain and Ireland) Van Diemen's Land	The ship was wrecked in Wineglass Bay.

== Unknown date ==
List of shipwrecks: Unknown date in February 1841
Ship	State	Description
Alexander McLeay	(United Kingdom of Great Britain and Ireland) New South Wales	The cutter ran aground and was wrecked at Sydney. She was on a voyage from Sydney to the Clarence River.
Benson	United Kingdom	The ship was abandoned in the Atlantic Ocean before 26 February.
Brutus	United Kingdom	The ship ran aground off Harwich, Essex. She was refloated and towed into Harwich by Endeavour ( United Kingdom).
Eliza	United Kingdom	The ship was driven ashore at Youghal, County Cork. She was on a voyage from Newport, Monmouthshire to Youghal. Eliza was refloated on 27 February.
Leighton	United Kingdom	The ship was driven ashore at Aberystwyth, Cardiganshire. She was refloated on 14 February and taken into Aberystwyth.
Maidstone	United Kingdom	The ship was driven ashore at Lavernock Point, Glamorgan. She was on a voyage from Newport, Monmouthshire to London. Maidstone was refloated on 21 February and towed into Newport in a waterlogged condition.
Mary	United Kingdom	The ship was in collision with a brig and foundered in the North Sea off the coast of County Durham. Her crew were rescued. She was on a voyage from South Shields, County Durham to London.
Mary Ann and Eliza	United Kingdom	The ship was driven ashore at Truro, Cornwall. She was refloated on 12 February and taken into Truro for repairs.
Montcalm	United Kingdom	The ship sank at North Shields, County Durham.
Rose	United Kingdom	The ship was lost off the mouth of the Black River, Mosquito Coast. All on board were rescued.
San Joaquim	Spain	The brig was wrecked near "Naino", China. Her crew were rescued and the vessel was burnt.
Sesostris	United Kingdom	The ship was driven ashore in Machrihanish Bay. She was on a voyage from Pictou, Nova Scotia, British North America to the Clyde.
Superior	United Kingdom	The ship ran aground in the Madura Strait. She was on a voyage from Surabaya, Netherlands East Indies to London. Superior was refloated and put back to Surabaya.
Vixen	United Kingdom	The ship was driven ashore in Studland Bay. She had been refloated by 12 February.
