= Butterworth (1785 ship) =

British ship)

History

France
- Name: Américaine (or Amérique)
- Owner: Bretel, Ernouf, and La Houssaye, of Granville
- Launched: France, 1778
- Captured: Captured 26 January 1781

Great Britain
- Name: America
- Acquired: 1784 by purchase
- Renamed: Butterworth (1785)
- Fate: Lost 1802

General characteristics
- Tons burthen: 340 (French); 1784-1791:330 (bm); 1791-1802:390, 392, or 400 (bm)
- Sail plan: Ship
- Complement: 1779-1781:138-249; 1789:48; 1793:40; 1796:26; 1797:35
- Armament: 1778-1782:32 guns; 1793:16 × 9-pounder guns; 1796:12 × 6-pounder guns; 1797:18 × 6&18-pounder guns

Butterworth was launched in 1778, in France as the highly successful 32-gun privateer Américaine, of Granville. The British Royal Navy captured her early in 1781. She first appeared in a commercial role in 1784, as America, and was renamed in 1785, as Butterworth. She served primarily as a whaler in the Greenland whale fisheries. New owners purchased her in 1789. She underwent a great repair in 1791 that increased her size by almost 20%. She is most famous for her role in the "Butterworth Squadron", which took her and two ship's tenders on an exploration, sealing, otter fur, and whaling voyage to Alaska and the Pacific Coast of North America. She and her consorts are widely credited with being the first European vessels to enter, in 1794, what is now Honolulu harbour. After her return to England in 1795, Butterworth went on three more whaling voyages to the South Pacific, then Africa, and then the South Pacific again. In 1802, she was outward bound on her fourth of these voyage, this to the South Pacific, when she was lost.

== French privateer ==
Many accounts of the Butterworth Squadron refer to Butterworth as a former French 30-gun frigate. The tern "frigate" was often used loosely. Butterworth's previous name was American, and there was no French warship of that name that fit her description. However, there was a French privateer frigate Américaine, of Granville, that carried 32 guns and that was active between 1779 and 1780.

Between 1778 and 1779, Américaine was under the command of Captain Paul Eudes de la Cocardière. Under his command she captured at least four prizes: Hunter, Sorel, Edgipezeriere, and Good Intent. He paid Américaine off on 20 May 1779. (Note: Lloyd's List on 29 January 1779, provides a list of prizes that the French privateer Amerique, of 32 guns, belonging to Granville, had taken: Catherine, Hawkins, master, with provisions for the West Indies, taken 3 January; Howberry, Shea, master, of Bristol, from Newfoundland, taken on 13 January, ransomed for £800, arrived in the River Shannon; York, Ward, from Limerick to London, with "King's Provisions", ransomed for £4,300; Friendship, Fannel, master, sailing from Cork to Gibraltar with provisions for the garrison; Hunter, Hine, master, of Bristol, from Newfoundland; Sorell transport, from Quebec; Peggy of Lieth, with fruit from St Lucia; Britannia, from Oporto to Bristol; Prince George, of London, from Lisbon, ransomed for £2,000, and arrived at "Calletown"; a ship from Cork with provisions; a ship from Halifax to Cork; and two ships from the West-Indies, and one from the "Streights".)

Captain François Jourdan de la Monnerie was her next captain, in 1780. Under his command she captured the prizes Machora, Betsy, Sil Lah, Race Horse, Elisabeth Quenley, Notre Dame du Rosaire, and Hanto of Black. He paid her off on 3 July 1780.

Américaine then made a third cruise. On 17 January 1781, Américaine recaptured the Dutch ship Hendrick Frederick, Captain Raba, master. Hendrick Fredrick had been sailing from Porto to Nantes with 400 chests of fruit when on 13 December, at 45°20′N 11°32′W Little Ben, Hayes, master, had captured her.

HMS Prudente captured the "private man of war" Américaine on 26 January 1781. She was armed with 32 guns and carried a crew of 245. Prudente and HMS Ambuscade brought "the American French Privateer" into Portsmouth. Ambuscade shared in the proceeds of the capture. (Note: The prize money notice in the London Gazette gives a capture year of 1780, but this is a typographical error.)

== British career ==
America first appears in supplementary pages to Lloyd's Register for 1784. She is described as a ship of French origin and 330 tons (bm), launched in 1778. Her master is Boudinot, her owner J. Atkinson, and her trade New York-London.

In 1785, America was sold and her new owner, Butterworth, renamed her Butterworth. He then employed her as a Greenland whaler under Captain M. Pile, changing in 1786 to J. Cockburn. Ellison succeeded Cockburn. Lloyd's List reported in July 1787, that Butterworth, Ellison, master, was at Davis Strait, having taken six fish (whales). On 17 June 1788, Butterworth was again at Davis Strait, having taken three fish (whales).

Then in 1789, T. Pritzler (or Pritzlea) replaced Butterworth as owner, and William Brown became her master. (Note: Thomas and Theophilus Pritzler were sugar refiners and timber merchants at Wapping and Greenwich. One had been a master mariner.) Her trade became London-Davis Strait.

At some point around 1791, Brown approached interested parties with a proposal to explore Baffin Bay or approach the North Pole. (Note: Brown's proposal contained a list of the roles of the 48 men aboard Butterworth, together with their monthly wages, which ranged from £5 for the master to 30s for each of the 17 ordinary seamen. He also budgeted £72 per month (30s/man/month) for provisions, and £98 per month (£5/ton for 392 tons (bm)), for wear and tear on the vessel.)

In 1791, four individuals signed a testimonial to the gun-maker Charles Moore, of East Smithfield, certifying that Moore's harpoon gun was particularly suited to whale fishing as it kept the priming dry. The four were: Theophilus Pritzler (as master of Lyon), Sinclair Halcrow (as master of Lyon), William Stavers (as master of Leviathan), and William Brown (as master of Butterworth).

In 1791, Butterworth's trade became London-Greenland, changing to London-Nootka. (Note: Nootka could be Nootka Sound, or Nootka Island. They are close together.) In 1792, Butterworth's burthen changed to 390 tons after a "great repair" in 1791.

=== Butterworth squadron ===
Alderman William Curtis, Theophilus Pritzler, and probably John Perry, a Blackwall shipbuilder, financed an expedition consisting of three vessels, Butterworth, and two smaller tenders: Jackall, Alexander Stewart (or Steward), master, (Note: Jackall, of 86 tons (bm), had been launched in America in 1782. Her owner was Priestly.) and Prince Lee Boo, E. Sharp, master. (Note: Prince Lee Boo, of 56 tons (bm), had been launched on the Thames in 1791. Priestly owned her too.) Captain William Brown, master of Butterworth, commanded the expedition.

The expedition is notable for a violent conflict with the Tla-o-qui-aht People of Vancouver Island and another reported conflict in Formosa. Butterworth, Jackal, and Prince Lee Boo are often credited with being the first European vessels to enter Honolulu Harbor.

France declared war on Britain on 1 February 1793. Brown received a letter of marque on 26 June 1793, i.e., in absentia. All three vessels of the Butterworth squadron were well at Nootka in October 1793. In late 1793, Brown transferred to Jackall, Sharp transferred to Butterworth, and Robert Gordon took command of Prince Lee Boo.

On 14 March 1794, Butterworth and Prince Lee Boo were well at "Mout Lerry", Nootka. HMS Discovery and HMS Chatham had wintered there and then sailed for the Sandwich Islands.

Butterworth then sailed to the California coast, and from there to the Galapagos.

At some point Butterworth encountered Rattler. Rattler, James Colnett, master, was on voyage of exploration to the Pacific for the whaling firm of Samuel Enderby & Sons.

Jackall and Prince Lee Boo were at Hawai'i by 1 January 1795. There Brown and Gordon were killed defending their vessels from an attack by the locals. The Hawaiians captured both vessels but the crews recaptured their vessels. George Lampert and William Bonallack replaced Brown and Gordon as captains of the two vessels.

Butterworth returned to England from the Galapagos on 3 February 1795. She was under the command of Sharpe, and carried 85 tuns of whale oil and 17500 seal skins. She arrived back at London 24 April 1808.

=== Whaling ===
In 1795, Butterworth, Sinclair Halcrow, master, may have sailed on a whaling voyage. There is no further information on this voyage. Lloyd's Register for 1796, shows her master changing from W. Brown to S. Halcrow and her trade from London-Nootka to London-South Seas.

Halcrow received a letter of marque on 21 March 1796. He then sailed her on a whaling voyage, this one to Delagoa Bay. Lloyd's List, dated 9 December 1796, reported that a French privateer had attacked Butterworth in Delagoa Bay, but that Butterworth had repelled the attack. (Note: The privateer was Modeste, under the command of Captain Claude Deschiens. Modeste did capture Princess.) Butterworth put into Rio de Janeiro in March 1797, for water, refreshment, and calefaction; she also had sick aboard. She returned to Britain on 1 June.

On 16 September 1797, Captain Lawrence Frazier received a letter of marque for Butterworth. He sailed from Britain on 4 October 1797, for the Pacific Ocean. By this time Mather & Co. had purchased Butterworth. (Note: James, Thomas, and John Mather were noted merchants and navy contractors. They also owned numerous whaling vessels.) She was reported to have been at the Galapagos islands in August–September 1798. She was in the Marquesas Islands in January 1799. There she gave passage to England to the missionary William Pascoe Crook. (Note: Crook had arrived in 1797 aboard Duff, which the London Missionary Society had purchased to deliver missionaries to the islands of the South Pacific.) She arrived in Britain on 19 May 1799.

Butterworth and New Euphrates received permission on 7 March 1800, from the British East India Company to sail east of the Cape of Good Hope to the Southern Whale Fishery. Butterworth left London on 18 March 1800, Henry Glasspoole (or Glaspool), master. She sailed on 27 April, with a fleet of 150 sail under convoy. On 15 May, she and Leviathan received the fleet commodore's permission to leave the fleet. Butterworth and Leviathan parted company on 24 May. In June, Butterworth stopped at Rio de Janeiro for water, food, refreshment, and calefaction. She was well on the coast of Chile in April 1801, and had gathered 700 barrels of sperm oil. She returned to Britain on 23 March 1802, having gathered more than 920 barrels of whale oil while whaling off Chile.

== Loss ==
Lloyd's List reported that Butterworth, Folger, master, had been lost on 13 July 1802, off St. Jago, while outbound to the Southern Fisheries. One man was drowned, but the rest of the crew were saved and returned to Portsmouth.
