= French ship Blonde =

Several ships of the French navy have borne the name Blonde:

- Blonde (1755), captured in 1760 by HMS Aeolus and taken into service as HMS Blonde. She was wrecked in 1782.
- Blonde, launched in 1781, that HMS Latona and Phaeton captured in 1793; she was taken into service as HMS Blonde. She was sold in 1794 and became a whaling ship that a French privateer captured in 1796.
