= Phoenix (1785 EIC ship) =

British East Indiaman 1785–1803

History

Great Britain
- Name: Phoenix
- Owner: William Moffat (principal managing owner)
- Operator: East India Company
- Builder: Wells
- Launched: 1785
- Fate: From 1803 in coastal trade in India; ultimate fate unknown

General characteristics
- Tons burthen: 800, or 80049/94 (bm)
- Length: 143 ft 7 1/2 in (43.8 m) (overall)
- Beam: 36 ft (11.0 m)
- Depth of hold: 14 ft 9 in (4.5 m)
- Sail plan: Full-rigged ship
- Complement: 90-100 men
- Armament: 1793: 26 × 6-pounder guns; 1800: 26 × 12-pounder guns

Phoenix was an East Indiaman, launched in 1785. She made six voyages for the Honourable East India Company (HEIC). On her sixth voyage, while under the command of Captain William Moffat, she captured the French 14-gun privateer Malartic. In 1803 her owners sent her out to India to sail in the coastal trade; her subsequent fate is unknown.

== Voyages ==
=== First voyage (1786–1787) ===
Captain James Rattray commanded Phoenix on her first voyage, which was to Madras and Bengal. She left the Downs on 16 January 1786. She was reported to have been well on 6 May at 17°25′S 75°40′E, and within three weeks sail of Madras. She reached Madras on 20 May and left ten days later. She then arrived at Diamond Harbour, south of Calcutta, on 13 November. On her homeward voyage, she passed Saugor on 19 December. By 3 March 1787 she was at St Helena, and she arrived at the Downs on 18 May. On her return voyage she brought with her a beautiful gray Arabian stallion whose price, including transport costs, was £1510.

=== Second voyage (1788–1789) ===
For her second voyage, this one also to Bengal and Madras, Phoenix was under the command of Captain Alexander Gray, who would be her captain for her third voyage too. She left the Downs on 17 February 1788, and on 16 March was at Madeira. She reached Diamond Harbour on 19 July. She passed Saugor on 5 January 1789 and by 20 February was in Madras. From there she sailed to the Cape, which she reached on 5 May. On 10 June she was at St Helena, and on 6 August she arrived at the Downs.

On 22 September 1790, the Court of Directors of the HEIC held a secret meeting to investigate allegations that one of the directors, a John Woodhouse, had nominated Gray as captain for the voyage in return for "pecuniary consideration". The investigation came to an end when Woodhouse resigned from the Directory on 1 February 1791. However, there was no doubt that the infraction of the company's rules had occurred.

=== Third voyage (1791–1792) ===
Captain Gray again sailed Phoenix to Madras and Bengal. Before leaving, Gray engaged a Scotsman, Alexander Macdonald, to ship aboard Phoenix as his servant and occasional piper.

Phoenix left the Downs on 4 Apr 1791 and reached São Tiago on 1 May. There a storm drove her out to sea and she almost wrecked on some rocks. She left on 8 May and reached Madras on 4 August. There she landed all her cargo, those of her passengers destined for that city. She also landed three officers and 220 recruits for the 72nd Regiment and 76th Regiment of Foot. On 7 August she left Madras, reaching Diamond Harbour on 13 August, where she discharged her remaining passengers. On 23 August she was at Kedgeree.

In mid-October, she took on board "450 sepoys with their officers, and a cargo of rice, paddy, gram, doll, and gee for the army on the Malabar coast." Phoenix delivered the troops and cargo at Madras towards the end of the month.

In the beginning of November she left Madras roads, but encountered a sudden squall that almost put her on her beam ends. Contrary winds prevented her from immediately reaching Diamond Harbour. She arrived there on 16 November.

On 15 December, she was at Saugor. Phoenix started to take cargo on in the middle of December and on the 25th she reached Cox's Island where she took on the last of her cargo. On 8 January 1792 she sailed for Madras, which she reached eight days later. There she took on 150 passengers and invalid soldiers. On 20 January she sailed for Britain.

Adverse winds made it difficult to pass the Cape of Good Hope, but Phoenix arrived at St Helena on 5 April. She stayed there for 12 days to take in water and fresh provisions, leaving on 16 April. On 2 June she arrived at the Downs, where she landed some her passengers, and on 7 June moored in Long Reach.

=== Fourth voyage (1794–1795) ===
For her fourth voyage, this to Madras, Phoenix was under the command of Captain Wemys Orrok (or Wemyss Orrok). This voyage took place after the commencement of the French Revolutionary Wars, so the Company arranged for Phoenix to sail under a letter of marque. This was dated 14 November 1793, and still gave her captain's name as Alexander Gray.

The British government held Phoenix at Portsmouth, together with a number of other Indiamen in anticipation of using them as transports for an attack on Île de France (Mauritius). It gave up the plan and released the vessels in May 1794. It paid £1,500 9d for having delayed her departure by 72 days.

Phoenix sailed from Portsmouth on 2 May and reached Madras on 3 September. She was back at St Helena on 7 January 1795 and the Downs on 23 July.

=== West Indies Expedition (1795–1796) ===
The Admiralty chartered Phoenix as a troopship for Admiral Hugh Cloberry Christian's expedition to the West Indies. She sailed for the West Indies on 9 December, but bad weather delayed the start of the expedition and the vessels had to put back to England. After numerous false starts aborted by weather issues, the fleet sailed on 26 April to invade St Lucia, with troops under Lieutenant-General Sir Ralph Abercromby. St Lucia surrendered to the British on 25 May. The British went on to capture Saint Vincent and Grenada.

=== Fifth Voyage (1796–1799) ===
Orrok was again captain of Phoenix, sailing her to Bengal, Penang and Madras. She left Portsmouth on 11 August 1796, arriving at the Cape on 18 November. By 4 March 1797 she was at Kedgeree, and one month later at Diamond Harbour. On 9 August she reached Saugor, from which she sailed to Penang, which she reached on 24 August. On 12 October she returned to Penang, and on 11 December she was at Madras. She reached Kedgeree on 25 January 1798.

The reason for the to-and-fro was that the British government mounted an expedition against Manila in 1797-8. (One of the Royal Navy vessels involved appears to have been HMS Sybille.) The EIC held several vessels in India to support the expedition. There were eight regular ships: Lord Camden, Busbridge, Minerva, Lord Macartney, Lord Hawkesbury, Sir Stephen Lushington, Phoenix, and General Goddard. There were also three "dismantled ships": Pitt, Lascalles, and Royal Admiral. The owners claimed demurrage; for Phoenix, the amount they claimed was £6,083 6s 8d for 292 days.

The captains of all the vessels sued the EIC for reimbursement for expenses consequent on the delay to their homeward bound journeys, and for the eight regular ships, the additional risks involved in the detours to Penang. In 1800 the court awarded six of the captains of the regular ships, Orrock among them, £750 each. The court further ordered that the officers of the vessels involved receive some payment. Phoenix's officers received £250 in all. The chief mate received £64 2s 1d, the purser £25 12s 10d, and the other officers intermediate amounts.

For the return leg to Britain, Phoenix passed Saugor on 5 April. She was at the Cape on 14 September and St Helena on 3 November. She arrived at The Downs on 3 February 1799.

=== Sixth voyage (1800–1802) ===
For her last voyage Phoenix was under the command of Captain William Moffat, who sailed her for Bengal, Bombay and Mokha (Note: Captain William Moffat may have been the nephew of William Moffat (MP), who may have been the owner. During the voyage, Captain William Moffat commissioned a memorial to his father, James, who had died in Calcutta in 1788. William Moffat MP's father was John (1676-1742).) Phoenix left Torbay on 27 May 1800 and reached the Cape on 6 September. On 10 November Phoenix captured the French privateer Malartic (or General Malartic, or General Malrtique), which was under the command of Jean-Marie Dutertre, and which had attempted to take her, in the Bay of Bengal. The capture took place at 20°15′N 91°18′E, which is about 200 km SSW of Cox's Bazar. General Malartic was armed with 14 guns, two of them 42-pounder carronades, and had a crew of 120 men. She was five months out of Mauritius. Moffat took General Malartic with him to Bengal.

Capturing General Malartic earned Moffat the public award of an honour sword. The privateer had captured several East Indiamen, including Raymond, Woodcot, and Princess Royal, all of the same size as Phoenix. (Note: Hardy gave the date of capture of Raymond and Woodcot as 20 April 1798, and the captor as the French frigate Preneuse. He agreed that Malartic captured Princess Royal, and give the date of the capture as 29 September 1793.)

Fifteen days after capturing Malartic Phoenix reached Kedgeree, and on 7 December she arrived at Diamond Harbour. She was at Saugor on 9 January 1801. Outward bound, she left off her pilot at the mouth of the Hooghly River on 14 January. On board she carried Major-General Sir David Baird, who was going to Trincomalee to take a faster ship to Bombay. There he would take command of the Indian army that was going to Egypt to help General Ralph Abercromby expel the French there.

Phoenix reached Trincomalee on 25 February and Colombo on 5 March. From there she sailed to Bombay, which she reached on 2 April, arriving two days after Baird. She was apparently carrying troops for Baird's expedition to the Red Sea.

By 3 August, Phoenix was at Aden, and three weeks later at Mokha. Moffat took the opportunity to chart the mouth of the Red Sea; a copy of his chart is now in the United States Library of Congress.

Baird landed at Kosseir, on the Egyptian side of the Red Sea. He then led his troops army across the desert to Kena on the Nile, and then to Cairo. He arrived before Alexandria in time for the final operations.

Phoenix returned to Bombay by 17 October. She left Bombay on 15 November bound for Anjengo and Mahé. She was in company with several other Indiamen: Fort William, Worcester, Airly Castle, Lord Hawkesbury, and Rockingham. Phoenix reached Tellicherry on 23 November. By 4 January 1802 Phoenix was at Anjengo. She reached St Helena by 5 April and Gravesend by 11 June.

== Fate ==
In 1803 her owners sent her out to India for the local coastal trade. There is currently no easily accessible record of her subsequent fate. (In 1803 there was a Phoenix, L.B.Mawell, master, registered at Madras.) It is possible that the French privateer Henriette (Captain Henri), captured Phoenix on 13 November 1805.

In 1805 a new Phoenix made her first voyage for the EIC.
