= HMS Fox (1780) =

Frigate of the Royal Navy

History

United Kingdom
- Name: HMS Fox
- Ordered: 10 December 1778
- Builder: George Parsons, Bursledon, Hampshire
- Laid down: February 1779
- Launched: 2 June 1780
- Completed: By 27 July 1780
- Honours and awards: Naval General Service Medal with clasp "Egypt"
- Fate: Broken up in April 1816

General characteristics
- Class & type: 32-gun Active-class fifth rate frigate
- Tons burthen: 69685/94 bm
- Length: 126 ft 2 1/4 in (38.462 m) (gundeck); 104 ft 1 in (31.72 m) (keel)
- Beam: 35 ft 5 3/4 in (10.814 m)
- Depth of hold: 12 ft 2 in (3.71 m)
- Sail plan: Full-rigged ship
- Crew: 250
- Armament: Upper deck: 26 × 12-pounder guns; QD: 4 × 6-pounder guns + 4 × 24-pounder carronades; Fc: 2 × 6-pounder guns + 2 × 24-pounder carronades

HMS Fox was a 32-gun Active-class fifth rate frigate of the Royal Navy. She was launched on 2 June 1780 at Bursledon, Hampshire by George Parsons.

== Early career ==
Fox was sent to the Caribbean in late 1781 and in January the following year under Captain Thomas Windsor captured two Spanish frigates. In March 1783 under Captain George Stoney captured the Spanish frigate Santa Catalina.

Fox was at Plymouth on 20 January 1795 and so shared in the proceeds of the detention of the Dutch naval vessels, East Indiamen, and other merchant vessels that were in port on the outbreak of war between Britain and the Netherlands.

In March 1797, near Visakhapatnam, Fox captured the French privateer Modeste, under Jean-Marie Dutertre.

Took part in the bloodless Raid on Manila in January 1798.

Given that Fox served in the navy's Egyptian campaign between 8 March and 2 September 1801, her officers and crew qualified for the clasp "Egypt" to the Naval General Service Medal that the Admiralty issued in 1847 to all surviving claimants.

== Napoleonic Wars ==
On 12 May 1809, Fox, Commander Henry Hart, brought into Madras, her prize Caravan, Aikin, master. Caravan was the former Cartier, Aikin, master, that the privateer French brig Adèle had captured in October 1807. Caravan had been carrying stones for building forts, arrack, coffee, and several carriages and bandies.

== War of 1812 ==
From April to June 1812 Fox was at Woolwich Dockyard being refitted as a 16 gun troopship.

On 30 March 1813 the 2nd Royal Marine Battalion embarked on the ships HMS Romulus, HMS Diomede, HMS Nemesis, and HMS Fox set sail on 7 April, and arrived in Bermuda on 29 May 1813.

In September 1814 Fox was in a squadron, with Bedford as flagship, that carried the advance guard of Major General Keane's army, which was moving to attack New Orleans. Under the rules of prize-money, the troopship Fox shared in the proceeds of the capture of the American vessels in the Battle of Lake Borgne on 14 December 1814. (Note: 'Notice is hereby given to the officers and companies of His Majesty's ships Aetna, Alceste, Anaconda, Armide, Asia, Bedford, Belle Poule, Borer, Bucephalus, Calliope, Carron, Cydnus, Dictator, Diomede, Dover, Fox, Gorgon, Herald, Hydra, Meteor, Norge, Nymphe, Pigmy, Ramillies, Royal Oak, Seahorse, Shelburne, Sophie, Thames, Thistle, Tonnant, Trave, Volcano, and Weser, that they will be paid their respective proportions of prize money.')

The Fox, along with the Dasher, Fairy, Espiegle, Columbia, Barbadoes, Muros, Chanticleer, and Niobe were utilised as troop ships during the Invasion of Guadeloupe (1815) against the Bonapartist Admiral Linois. She returned to Portsmouth in October 1815, and then was duly sent to Le Havre.

== Fate ==
Fox was broken up in April 1816.
