= Jean-Marie Dutertre =

French privateer (1768–1811)

Jean-Marie Dutertre (1768 in Lorient – 1811), also called Jean Dutertre, was a French privateer. His ships included Modeste, Heureux, Passe-Partout and Malartic.

== Career ==
In September 1796, Dutertre set out for a campaign on the 20-gun Modeste, which had previously been captained by Robert Surcouf under the name Émilie. HMS Fox apparently captured her near Visakhapatnam in March 1797. (Note: Demerliac (p. 308, no 2898) states that Modeste was captured either by Fox in March 1797, or by Cleopatra in April 1798; it appears that Cleopatra was in the English channel at the time, when she captured a privateer named Émilie but unrelated to the present ship.)

Duterte commissioned the privateer Heureux at Île de France in July 1798. On 4 March 1799 Heureux captured Solimany, off Nagore. On 19 March the East Indiaman Dublin recaptured Solimany, Captain Hamed Pelley, master, of eight guns. Solimany had a prize crew of seven French men and a Swede on board. She was carrying a cargo of "sundry articles" and was on her way to Mauritius when Dublin recaptured her after a five-hour chase.

Dutertre captained the 12-gun privateer Malartic, with a 100 to 120-man crew. He was a friend and rival to Robert Surcouf in the Indian Ocean, one of whose several captured British East Indiamen was carrying the theodolite that would be used to triangulate the Indies and then measure the height of Mount Everest – this was returned "with compliments, for science". His dispute over recruiting crews at Port Louis on Mauritius – lured by a "better diet on board" – was settled by governor Malartic.

In 1800, Dutertre's Malartic captured the former East Indiaman Princess Royal. He also captured the former East Indiaman Thomas, and in the same cruise, the ships Surprise, Joyce, and Lord Hobart. He later captured Governor North, Marquis de Wellesley (Note: Name probably translated from English) and a brig, before returning to Mauritius, where he arrived with his prizes on 21 September 1800.

Soon after, Malartic departed for another campaign, capturing the ships Frederic North, Amboyna, Alkias, and Malava, but was herself captured by the East Indiaman Phoenix on 10 November 1800. Dutertre was taken prisoner, and was eventually released under the Treaty of Amiens in 1803.

Dutertre eventually stopped commerce raiding and enlisted in the Navy. He achieved the rank of lieutenant and died in 1811 after the Invasion of Isle de France.

== Notes and references ==
=== Bibliography ===
- Demerliac, Alain (2004). La Marine de la Révolution: Nomenclature des Navires Français de 1792 A 1799 (in French). Éditions Ancre. ISBN 2-906381-24-1.
- Gallois, Napoléon (1847). Les Corsaires français sous la République et l'Empire (in French). Vol. 2. Julien, Lanier et compagnie.
