= French brig Adèle =

France
- Name: Adèle
- Launched: c.1803
- Captured: December 1807

General characteristics (Adèle)
- Tons burthen: 280 (bm)
- Propulsion: Sail
- Complement: 150; 143 at capture
- Armament: 8 × 12-pounder carronades + 2 × 12-pounder long guns)

Several French vessels named Adèle operated in the Indian Ocean theatre in the late 18th and early 19th century. At least two were privateer brigs that the British Royal Navy captured, one in November 1800 and the other in December 1807. This article concerns the second Adèle.

== Origins ==
Adèle was built in Mauritius and registered and owned by the firm of Merle, Cabot & Co.

== Adèle ==
In 1803, Adèle sailed from the Isle de France (now Mauritius), to Port Jackson, New Holland, under the command of Louis Ruault Coutance, a former naval officer (Lieutenant de vaisseau). Her cargo consisted of 4,000 gallons of rum, 430 gallons of Cape wine, 6,000 lbs of sugar, 40 casks of meat, 11 anchors, a case of jewellery and a considerable quantity of cloth. She arrived at Port Jackson on 16 July 1803, and left on 4 September to return to Martinique.

On 24 June 1807, the "corsair, owner Bonaffé," advertised that she was about to leave on a cruise in July and needed 15 Mozambicans for her crew.

Adèle captured Cartier in October. Cartier later became Caravan, which HMS Fox recaptured in May 1809.

On 5 December, HMS Russell captured Adèle. Captain Caulfield, of Russell, reported that he had captured Adèle in the Indian Ocean, about 135 km off the coast of Burma (17°05′N 93°13′E). Adèle had sailed from Isle de France on 14 July, and carried "seven months' water and provisions for one hundred and fifty men".

== Fate ==
In 1819, the vessel L'Adele, belonging to Calcutta and of 275 tons (bm), was lost on the west coast of Sumatra.
