= Émilie (1793 ship) =

French corvette-built privateer

History

France
- Name: From 1792: Lafayette; From September 1793: Île de France; circa May 1794: Modeste; From early 1795: Émilie; From April 1796: Modeste
- Namesake: Gilbert du Motier, Marquis de Lafayette; Mauritius (then a French colony named "Île de France"; humility

General characteristics
- Tons burthen: 300 (French; "of load")
- Propulsion: Sail
- Complement: 32 men
- Armament: 1794:40 guns (including swivel guns; 1795: 4 × 6-pounder guns; 1796: 20 guns

Émilie a French corvette-built privateer based in Île de France (now Mauritius). She is mostly known as one of the ships captained by Robert Surcouf.

In early 1795 she was renamed to Émilie. She was then under command of young Robert Surcouf and was armed with only four 6-pounders cruising from August 1795; in January 1796, after she had captured Cartier, Surcouf transferred to his prize, leaving Émilie in command of Jean Croizet. (more details at Robert Surcouf#Cruise of Émilie and capture of Triton). She returned to Mauritius in March 1796 and was renamed Modeste again. In August 1796, armed with 20 guns, she cruised under Claude Deschiens, who died in battle on 10 September 1796; command passed to Jean-Marie Dutertre and she returned to Isle de France in June 1797. Dutertre went on another cruise from late 1797 or early 1798, and sailed until April 1798 (again with 20 guns). Her fate is murky: in March 1797 the 32-gun HMS Fox captured Émilie near Visakhapatnam, but then in April 1798 the 32-gun HMS Cleopatra also captured an Émilie.

== Career ==
Émilie was originally the merchantman Lafayette, which arrived at Île de France from Bordeaux in July 1792. In 1793, she was commissioned as a privateer corvette and conducted a campaign under Jean-François Malroux.

In September 1793, she was renamed Île de France and cruised until April 1794 under Léonard-Julien Quiroard.

Around May 1794, she was under Louis Levaillant, carrying the name Modeste. She notably captured the Dutch East India Company ship Hootluyce, with Joachim Drieux leading her boarding party.

In August 1795, Modeste passed under the command of Robert Surcouf, who renamed her Émilie. Governor Malartic had refused to provide Surcouf a lettre de marque and ordered Émilie to go to the Seychelles to purchase tortoises as food for Île de France. Upon arrival at Mahé, she encountered two large British ships and fled hastily, cutting her anchor. Arrived a Bago, Myanmar, Émilie encountered the British merchant Pinguin; she approached without hoisting colours and when Pinguin fired a warning shot, Surcouf took pretext of it to fire a three-shot broadside that induced Pinguin to surrender. Surcouf took supplies needed for Émilie and sent Pinguin to Mauritius under Péru, one of his officers. On 19 January, Émilie captured the pilot ship Cartier, along with two rice-loaded merchantmen she was guiding; Surcouf transferred to Cartier, which he renamed Hasard, taking all the guns off Émilie and leaving only 23 men aboard under Jean Croizet, who returned to Île de France with the two prizes.

When she returned to Île de France, Émilie was renamed back to Modeste. In August 1796, she set out for another campaign under Claude Deschiens, this time armed with 20 guns. She captured Princess while Princess was at anchor in Delagoa Bay. Although Modeste captured Princess, Butterworth was able to fend off Modeste. Modeste did capture Good Intent two days later.

Deschiens was killed in action on 10 September. As Deschiens was preying on British whalers, two heavily armed whalers attacked Modeste. Deschiens managed to repel them but was injured in the battle and died of his wounds the next day. Jean-Marie Dutertre took command and continued the cruize. Still, Modeste returned to Île de France within the month.

The same month, she set out for another campaign under Jean-Marie Dutertre. Apparently HMS Fox captured Modeste near Visakhapatnam in March 1797. (Note: Demerliac states that Modeste's captor was either HMS Fox in March 1797, or HMS Cleopatra in April 1798. It appears that Cleopatra was in the English channel in April 1798 when she captured a privateer named Émilie. The Émilie that Cleopatra captured was a razee from Lorient mounting sixteen 6-pounder and two brass 12-pounder guns. Émilie had a crew of 110 men and had been out 39 days.)
