= Action of 17 February 1783 =

Naval engagement between Jamaica and Cuba

- Part of the American Revolutionary War
Date	17 February 1783
Location	Caribbean Sea in between Jamaica & Cuba
Result	British victory

Belligerents
Great Britain	Spain

Commanders and leaders
George Stoney	Unknown

Strength
1 Fifth-rate Frigate (HMS Fox)	1 frigate (Santa Catalina)

Casualties and losses
4 killed 1 wounded	1 frigate captured 35 killed and wounded 128 captured

The action of 17 February 1783 was a minor naval engagement fought in between Jamaica and Cuba in the Caribbean Sea between a Royal Navy frigate HMS Fox and a Spanish Navy frigate Santa Catalina.

== Events ==
Background

By the end of 1782 the Spanish and French had been on the defensive since the Battle of the Saintes, which signaled British domination of the seas in the Caribbean. Soon after the Royal Navy were conducting a blockade off Cap-François and Fort-Royal as well as keeping a watch off Havana. At the same time British frigates were intercepting both Spanish and French privateers.

Captain George Stoney in HMS Fox, a thirty-gun frigate was sent to Jamaica in charge of a captured Spanish privateer, one of two simultaneously taken near Santo Domingo.

Action

On 17 February whilst sailing off the coast of Jamaica, a sail was spotted and Fox sailed to investigate. As she approached, the vessel hauled up Spanish colours and thus cleared for action. Fox went in for the attack and soon realized she was fighting a frigate of nearly equal match in terms of size, guns and men. In the subsequent action which lasted for nearly four hours, the Spanish frigate was eventually dismasted by Fox's devastating carronades. The Spanish captain realized he could not put up a jury rig to escape and soon after struck.

Aftermath

Santa Catalina, a Spanish frigate of 22 guns and 163 men, was sent from Havana for the express purpose of making a prize of the British ship.

Fox had four men killed and one wounded in the action, whilst Santa Catalina was totally dismasted and sustaining nearly 35 casualties, with the rest of her crew of sailors and marines taken prisoner. Santa Catalina was broken up in Port Royal, as it was too damaged and had been advised against any repair.
