= Dublin (1784 EIC ship) =

1784 ship for the East India Company

History

Great Britain
- Name: Dublin
- Namesake: Dublin
- Owner: John Clements
- Operator: British East India Company
- Builder: Wells, Deptford
- Launched: 1784
- Fate: Sold 1800; lost shortly thereafter

General characteristics
- Tons burthen: 785, 786, or 78621/94 (bm)
- Length: Overall:145 ft 1 1/2 in (44.2 m); Keel:117 ft 11 3/4 in (36.0 m) (keel)
- Beam: 34 ft 4 3/4 in (10.5 m)
- Depth of hold: 14 ft 9 in (4.5 m)
- Propulsion: Sails
- Sail plan: Full-rigged ship
- Complement: 90
- Armament: 26 × 9&4-pounder guns
- Notes: Three decks

Dublin was launched in 1784 as an East Indiaman. She made six voyages for the British East India Company (EIC), to India and China. On her last voyage for the EIC she recaptured a country ship. Her owners sold Dublin in 1800 and she became a West Indiaman, but apparently was lost on her first voyage.

== Career ==
EIC voyage #1 (1785–1786): Captain William Smith sailed from The Downs on 11 February 1785, bound for Madras and Bengal. In March Dublin was at Madeira and on 5 July at False Bay. She reached Madras on 20 September and arrived at Diamond Harbour on 12 November. Homeward bound, she was at Kedgeree on 8 January 1786 and False Bay again on 14 June. She reached St Helena on 18 July and arrive back at The Downs on 28 September.

EIC voyage #2 (1788–1789): Captain Smith sailed from The Downs on 4 April 1788, bound for Bombay and Bengal. Dublin was at Simon's Bay on 13 June, and reached Bombay on 3 August. She reached Madras on 4 October and arrived at Diamond Harbour on 9 November. Homeward bound, she was at Saugor on 3 February 1789. She was at Madras again on 16 March, reached St Helena on 24 June, and arrived at Long Reach on 28 August.

EIC voyage #3 (1791–1793): Captain Smith sailed from The Downs on 3 May 1791, bound for Madras, Bombay, and China. Dublin reached Madras on 16 August and arrived at Diamond Harbour on 8 September. She then sailed for Bombay. She was at Culpee on 16 October, Anjengo on 22 November, Cochin on 24 November, and Tellicherry on 29 November. She arrived at Bombay on 12 December. She sailed for Bengal again, stopping at Cannanore at 22 January 1792, Cochin on 27 January, and Madras on 24 February. She arrived at Diamond Harbour on 15 March, but was back at Bombay on 23 June. She sailed for China, reaching Malacca on 8 September and arriving at Whampoa anchorage on 23 October. Homeward bound, she crossed the Second Bar on 13 December, reached St Helena on 27 March 1793, and arrived at Long Reach on 20 June. She then underwent a thorough repair.

EIC voyage #4 (1794–1795): War with France had broken out while Dublin was almost home on her third voyage. Captain Smith acquired a letter of marque on 29 November 1793.

The British government held Dublin at Portsmouth, together with 38 other Indiamen in anticipation of using them as transports for an attack on Île de France (Mauritius). It gave up the plan and released the vessels in May 1794. It paid £1,500 for having delayed her departure on her voyage to India by 72 days.

Captain Smith sailed from Portsmouth on 2 May, bound for Madras and China. Dublin reached Madras on 11 September and Penang on 22 October. She arrived at Whampoa on 23 January 1795. Homeward bound, she crossed the Second Bar on 14 March, reached Malacca on 26 April and St Helena on 31 August, and arrived at Long Reach on 29 November.

EIC voyage #5 (1796–1797): Captain Smith sailed from Portsmouth on 17 May 1796, bound for Madras and Bengal. Dublin reached Madras on 10 September and arrived at Diamond Harbour on 20 October. Homeward bound she was at Saugor on 17 December and Point de Galle on 29 January 1797. She sailed to Colombo, arriving there on 10 February, before returning to Point de Galle on 4 March. She reached Simon's Bay on 12 July and St Helena on 11 September. She arrived at Long Reach on 21 December.

EIC voyage #5 (1798–1800): Captain Robert Reay acquired a letter of marque on 3 April 1798. He had been first officer of Dublin on her two previous voyages. He sailed from Portsmouth on 29 April 1798, bound for China and Madras. Dublin was at Rio de Janeiro on 6 July, transited the Bali Straits on 27 September, and arrived at Whampoa on 23 November. She sailed to Madras, crossing the Second Bar on 8 January 1799, reaching Malacca on 23 February, and Nagore on 15 March.

On 19 March Dublin recaptured Solimany, Captain Hamed Pelley, master, of eight guns. The French privateer Heureux had captured Solimany on 4 March off Nagore. (Note: This may have been the privateer Heureux commissioned at Île de France in July 1798 under the command of the noted corsair Jean-Marie Dutertre.) Four men of her crew of lascars had escaped when she was captured. Solimany had a prize crew of seven French men and a Swede on board. She was carrying a cargo of "sundry articles" and was on her way to Mauritius when Dublin recaptured her after a five-hour chase.

Dublin came into Madras on 20 March, where Reay made his report. On 26 March Dublin was at Vizagapatam, but she returned to Madras on 22 April. She reached 10 Jun Masulipatam on 10 June and Vizagapatam on 14 June. She arrived at Diamond Harbour on 21 June. Homeward bound, she was at Saugor on 25 August, Madras again on 23 September, and the Cape of Good Hope on 30 December. She reached St Helena on 28 January 1800, and arrived at Long Reach on 1 June.

== Fate ==
Dublin was sold to become a West Indiaman. She appeared in Lloyd's Register (LR) in 1800 with Dixon, master, Faith & Co., owner, and trade London–St Kitts. The Register of Shipping for 1801 lists Dublin with the same information, except that her owner is Reeves & Co.

Dublin was reportedly lost on her first voyage.

She is last listed in the Register of Shipping in 1802, and in Lloyd's Register in 1806.
