= Claude Deschiens =

French slave trader and privateer (1745 - 1796)

Claude Louis Deschiens de Kerulvay
- Born: 1745
- Died: 1796

Claude Louis Deschiens de Kerulvay (February 1745 in Lorient – 10 September 1796, Modeste, Indian Ocean) was a French slave trader and privateer. His ships included the Boufonne, Philippine and Modeste.

== Career ==
Born Claude Louis Deschiens to Jean Deschiens and Marie Beauvoir, a merchant family, Deschiens appears in public records with his baptism at Lorient on 21 February 1745. From the age of 11, he began sailing as an apprentice, first on the cargo Rouillé from 1754, and then on Fidèle.

By 1774, Deschiens had achieved command in the merchant navy and the authorities of Île de France gave him command of the schooner Cheval-Marin to reconnoitre the Chagos Archipelago. In 1776, he was commander of Bouffonne, a 150-ton ship funded by his widowed mother; he departed Lorient on 28 May 1776 and arrived at Île de France on 25 November.

At the outbreak of the War of American Independence, Bouffonne obtained a letter of marque (Note: en guerre et en marchandises, i.e. as an armed merchantman) and Deschiens set out on 5 June 1779, with 4 guns and 25 men, to engage in the slave trade and to purchase rice.

== Notes and references ==
=== References ===
- Le corsaire lorientais Claude Deschiens de Kerulvay, Auguste Toussaint, in: Annales de Bretagne et des pays de l'Ouest. Tome 82, numéro 3, 1975. pp. 317–336.
- Claude DESCHIENS de KERULVAY, geneanet.org
- Les Corsaires en Océan Indien, Henri Maurel
- L'armateur préféré de Beaumarchais Jean Peltier Dudoyer, de Nantes à l'Isle de France, Tugdual de Langlais, Éd. Coiffard, 2015, 340 p. (ISBN 9782919339280).
- Marie-Étienne Peltier, Capitaine corsaire de la République, Tugdual de Langlais, Éd. Coiffard, 2017, 240 p. (ISBN 9782919339471).
- Claude Louis Deschiens, biographie de L. Noël Regnard, DBM (Dictionnaire de Biographie Mauricienne), janvier 1975, p 1032.
