= Rose (1786 EIC ship) =

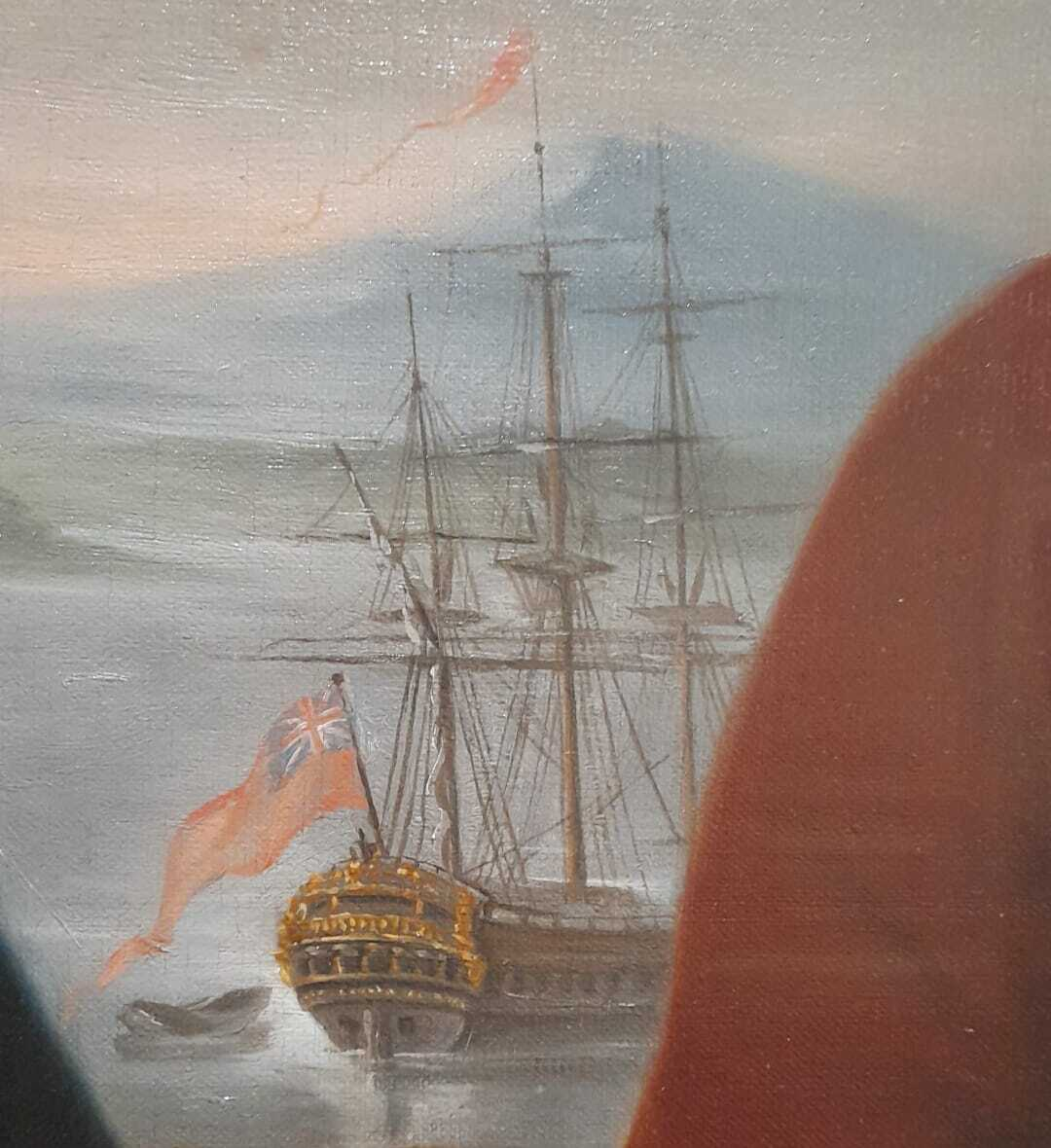
- Detail from a c. 1792 John Francis Rigaud portrait of the Money brothers depicting Rose

History
- Name: Rose
- Owner: EIC voyages #1-6:William Moffat; 1801:John Kymer; 1805:M'Taggart; 1810:Marshall; 1815:Dixon
- Builder: Wells, Deptford, for.
- Launched: November 1786
- Fate: Last listed in 1820

General characteristics
- Tons burthen: 800, or 801, or 80136/94 (bm)
- Length: Overall:143 ft 9 in (43.8 m); Keel:116 ft 3 in (35.4 m)>
- Beam: 36 ft 0 in (11.0 m)
- Depth of hold: 14 ft 9 in (4.5 m)
- Propulsion: Sail
- Complement: 1793:99; 1800:60
- Armament: 1793:26 × 6-pounder guns; 1800::26 × 6&12-pounder guns; 1815:2 × 6-pounder + 10 × 12-pounder + 12 × 9-pounder guns
- Notes: Three decks

Rose was launched in 1786 as an East Indiaman. She made six voyages between 1787 and 1800 for the British East India Company (EIC). She also participated as a transport for a military expedition to the West Indies. She then made one more voyage for the EIC, bringing rice back to England from Bengal. Next she sailed as a general trader, but also made one voyage seal hunting. She was last listed in 1820.

== Career ==
=== EIC voyage #1 (1787–1788) ===
Captain John H. Dempster sailed from The Downs on 21 February 1787, bound for Madras and China. Rose reached Madras on 2 June and arrived at Whampoa anchorage on 19 September. Homeward bound, she crossed the Second Bar on 6 January 1788, reached St Helena on 16 April, and arrived at The Downs on 22 June.

=== EIC voyage #2 (1789–1790) ===
Captain Dempster sailed from The Downs on 6 March 1789, bound for Madras and Bengal. Rose reached Madras on 19 June and arrived at Diamond Harbour on 29 June. Homeward bound, she was at Saugor on 28 October, reached St Helena on 28 January 1790, and arrived at her moorings on 26 April.

=== EIC voyage #3 (1792–1793) ===
Captain Dempster sailed from Torbay on 24 April 1792, bound for Madras and Bengal. Rose reached the Cape of Good Hope on 8 July and Madras on 25 August, and arrived at Diamond Harbour on 21 September. Homeward bound, She was at Saugor on 18 January 1793 and Madras on 17 February. She reached St Helena on 19 May, and arrived at The Downs on 21 August.

=== EIC voyage #4 (1794–1795) ===
War with France had broken out in 1793. Captain Dempster acquired a letter of marque on 21 August 1793. However, the British government held Rose at Portsmouth, together with 38 other Indiamen in anticipation of using them as transports for an attack on Île de France (Mauritius). It gave up the plan and released the vessels in May 1794. It paid £456 6s 8d for having delayed her departure by 22 days.

When she sailed, it was Captain ALexander Gray who sailed from Portsmouth on 2 May 1794, bound for Madras and Bengal. Rose reached Madras on 3 September and arrived at Diamond Harbour on 23 September. Homeward bound, she was at Cox's Island on 29 November, reached St Helena on 18 March 1795, and arrived at the Downs on 22 July.

=== West Indies Expedition (1795–1796) ===
The Admiralty chartered Rose as a transport for Admiral Hugh Cloberry Christian's expedition to the West Indies. Her captain was Smyth. She sailed for the West Indies on 9 December, but bad weather delayed the start of the expedition and the vessels had to put back to England. After numerous false starts aborted by weather issues, the fleet sailed on 26 April to invade St Lucia, with troops under Lieutenant-General Sir Ralph Abercromby. St Lucia surrendered to the British on 25 May. The British went on to capture Saint Vincent and Grenada.

Rose, Smith, master, arrived at Gravesend on 28 July 1796 from St Vincent.

=== EIC voyage #5 (1797–1798) ===
Captain Alexander Gray sailed from Portsmouth on 18 March 1797, bound for Madras and Bengal. Rose reached the Cape on 3 June and Madras on 7 August, and arrived at Diamond Harbour on 20 September. Homeward bound, she was at Saugor on 17 November, reached St Helena on 1 March 1798 and Cork on 30 June. She arrived at The Downs on 7 July.

=== EIC voyage #6 (1799–1800) ===
Captain Wemyss Orrok sailed from Portsmouth on 24 April 1799, bound for Madras and Bengal. Rose reached Madras on 21 August, and arrived at Diamond Harbour on 16 September. Homeward bound, she was at Saugor on 6 January 1800, reached St Helena on 13 June, and arrived at the Downs on 23 September.

=== EIC voyage #7 (1801–1802) ===
Mr. John Kymer tendered Rose to the EIC to bring back rice from Bengal. She was one of 28 vessels that sailed on that mission between December 1800 and February 1801.

Captain Christopher Kymer acquired a letter of marque on 23 December 1800. He sailed from the Downs on 19 January 1801. Rose reached Diamond Harbour on 25 May. Homeward bound, she was at Kedgeree on 17 August, reached St Helena on 31 December, and arrived at the Downs on 25 February 1802.

=== General trader ===
In 1802 Rose was sold. She thereafter served a variety of owners in a variety of trades.

In 1805 Rose, John Leith, master, M'Taggert, owner, made one voyage to the Isle of Desolation to gather seal skins. She returned on 13 May 1808. The Register of Shipping for 1806 has the same information as to master, owner, and trade. It also shows her as having undergone a "large repair" in 1802.

The Register of Shipping provided the following information:

Year	Master	Owner	Trade	Notes
1810	Marshall	Marshall	London–Tobago	"Thorough repair" - 1808
1815	Taylor	Dixon	London–Mediterranean	
1820	Taylor	Dixon	London–Mediterranean	

== Fate ==
Rose was last listed in the Register of Shipping in 1820. The Customs Registers show that she had been broken up by 1821.
