= French corvette Blonde (1781) =

Blonde
History

France
- Name: Blonde
- Ordered: 20 April 1780
- Builder: Toulon Dockyard
- Laid down: May 1780
- Launched: 6 January 1781, or 5 January
- Completed: February 1781
- Captured: 27 November 1793

Great Britain
- Name: Blond
- Acquired: November 1793 by capture
- Fate: Sold in 1794

Great Britain
- Name: Prince
- Acquired: 1794 by purchase
- Renamed: Princess (1795)
- Captured: 1796

General characteristics
- Class & type: Coquette-class corvette
- Displacement: 480 (unladen); 850 (laden) tons (French)
- Tons burthen: Prince: 640 (bm); Princess: 531, or 650, or 680
- Length: Overall:38.65 m (126.8 ft); Keel:34.45 m (113.0 ft)
- Beam: 9.90 m (32.5 ft)
- Draught: 4.9 m (16 ft)
- Depth of hold: 5.03 m (16.5 ft)
- Sail plan: Full-rigged ship
- Complement: Blonde: 210 (at capture); Princess: 35
- Armament: Blonde: **Originally:18-20 × 20 × 8-pounder guns; Later: 20 × 8-pounder guns + 6 × 6-pounder guns (spar deck); Princess: 12 × 6-pounder guns

Blonde was a Coquette-class corvette of the French Navy, launched in 1781. The British Royal Navy captured her in 1793 and sold her in 1794, without apparently ever actually having taken her into service. Mercantile interests purchased her and initially named her Prince, but then renamed her Princess. She became a whaler until a French privateer captured her in 1796 during Princess's first whaling voyage.

== French Navy (1781-1793) ==
The eight Coquette-class corvettes were built to a design by Joseph-Marie-Blaise Coulomb. Blonde had a refit in 1783, when she was not coppered but had four 4-pounders added to her armament.

In May and June 1782, she was under the command of Chevalier de Sparre, escorting the French 4000-man expeditionary force of the Invasion of Minorca (1781) from Mahon to Algesiras. On 12 June 1786, she departed Brest with the training fleet (escadre d'évolution) under Captain de Rivière, bound for Cherbourg. Twelve days later she took part in a naval review before Louis XVI. On 27 October 1787 she departed Brest under Captain de Chavagnac, bound for the Windward Islands station.

Between 21 April and 8 October 1790 Blonde was under the command of Major de vaissseau Rafélis de Broves. In May 1790 she was at Saint-Domingue. She then sailed to Saint Pierre and Miquelon, and the Terre-Neuve station. She arrived at Saint Pierre and Miquelon on 4 July 1790. That month a mutiny broke out on board.

On 27 October 1790 she departed Saint-Pierre and returned to Brest. There she was put in the reserve.

From 11 January to 4 February 1793 Blonde was stationed at Brest and Lorient under the command of lieutenant de vaisseau Deslandes. Then from 5 February she was under the command of lieutenant de vaisseau Guérin de l'Epiney.

== British Royal Navy (1793-1794) ==
On 27 November 1793, the ships of a squadron under the command of Captain Thomas Pasley of HMS Bellerophon captured Blonde off Ushant. At the time of her capture Blonde was armed with 28 guns and had a crew of 210 men under the command of Citizen Guerin. A subsequent prize money notice listed the vessels that shared in the proceeds as Bellerophon, Vanguard, Phoenix, Latona, and Phaeton. Some reports attribute the actual capture to Phaeton and Latona.

The Royal Navy classed Blonde as a sixth-rate frigate. However, there are no records that suggest that the Royal Navy commissioned Blonde or that she saw any service.

== Merchant man and whaler (1794-1796) ==
On 23 April 1794 Thomas Wilkinson wrote to the British East India Company (EIC) offering the ship Prince, late Blonde, of 640 tons on behalf of her owners. He described her as undergoing a complete refit at Plymouth. He offered to bring sugar from Bengal at £26 5s per ton for sugar in boxes, and £24 5s for sugar in bags. He further specified that if the EIC would be willing to take her up at Plymouth her owners would reduce her rates by 10s the ton. The EIC appears not to have taken up Prince, which also does not appear in any subsequent records.

However, Princess, J. Hopper, master, and Wilkinson, owner, enters Lloyd's Register in 1795 with J. Hopper, master, Wilkinson, owner, and trade as London–South Seas Fishery, that is whaling. The entry gives Princess's origins as Brest, and her year of launch as 1786. She had received copper sheathing in 1795.

Captain James Hopper acquired a letter of marque on 13 February 1795. He sailed for the fisheries on 31 March. Initially Princess was whaling off Brazil.

During 1796 the French privateer Modeste, Captain Claude Deschiens, captured Princess while she was at anchor in Delagoa Bay. Although Modeste captured Princess, Butterworth was able to fend off Modeste.
