= Bandy (carriage) =

Cart style in India

A bandy (sometimes spelled bandi, bamdi or vandi) is a cart used in India and Sri Lanka. It is constructed as a platform between two wheels, without any springs or suspension. It is usually yoked to a pair of oxen, though occasionally just one, or harnessed to small horses. The name is derived from Tamil: vandi and Telugu: bandi, meaning cart. The word continues to be used for almost any simple conveyance in India pulled by a draft animal, including those constructed with rubber automotive tires and those having sides or canopies. The driver, a bandyman, usually sits at the front of the cart straddling the yoke pole.

In May 1809, the ship HMS Fox brought into Madras her prize, Caravan, which was carrying "...carriages and bandis."

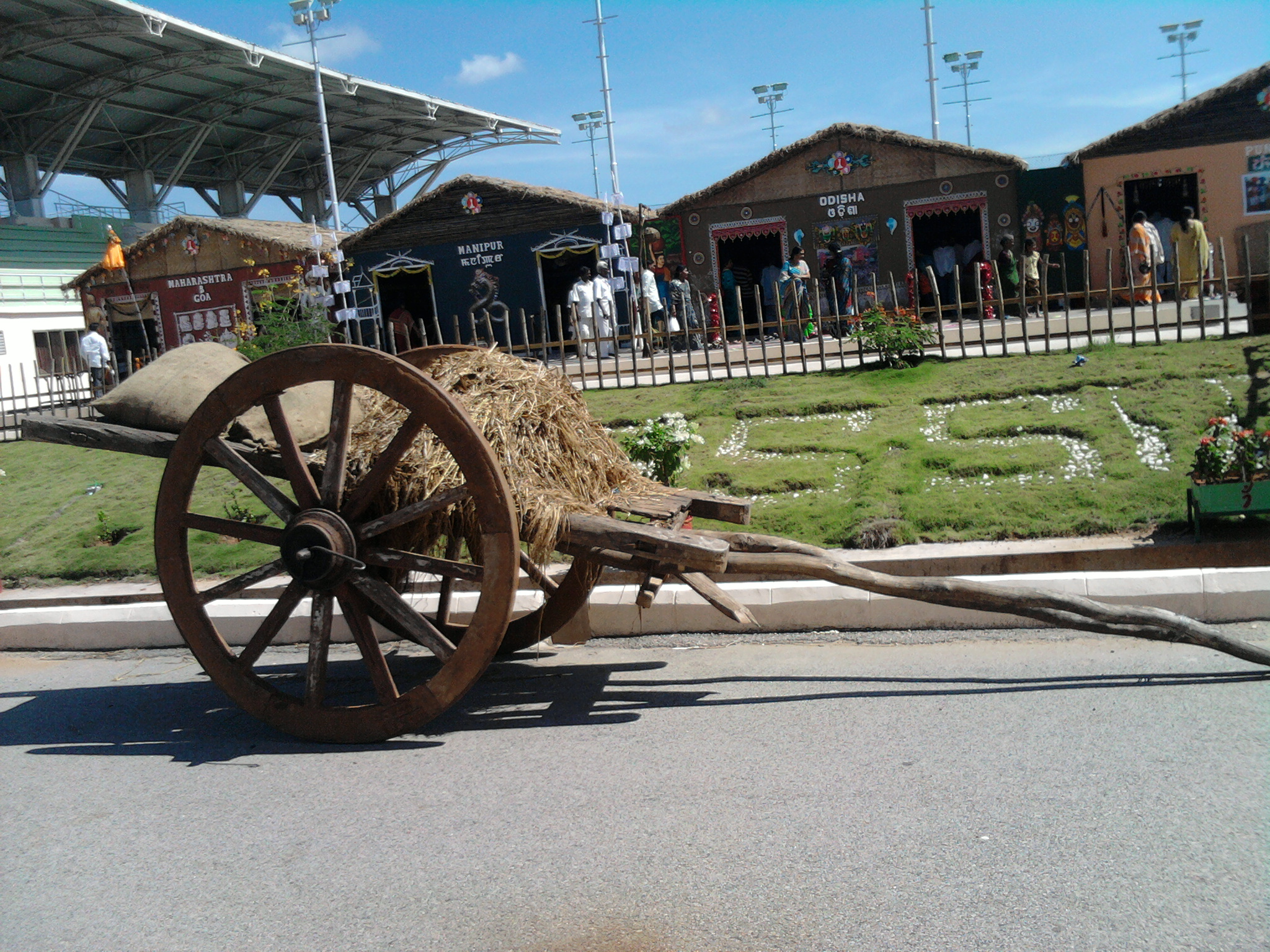
Basic bandy

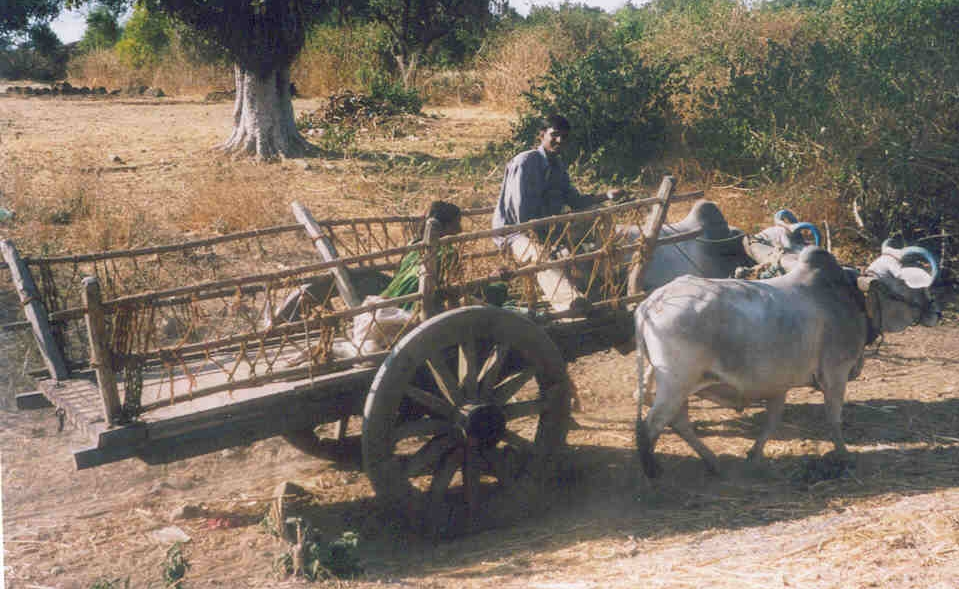
Arranged to contain a load

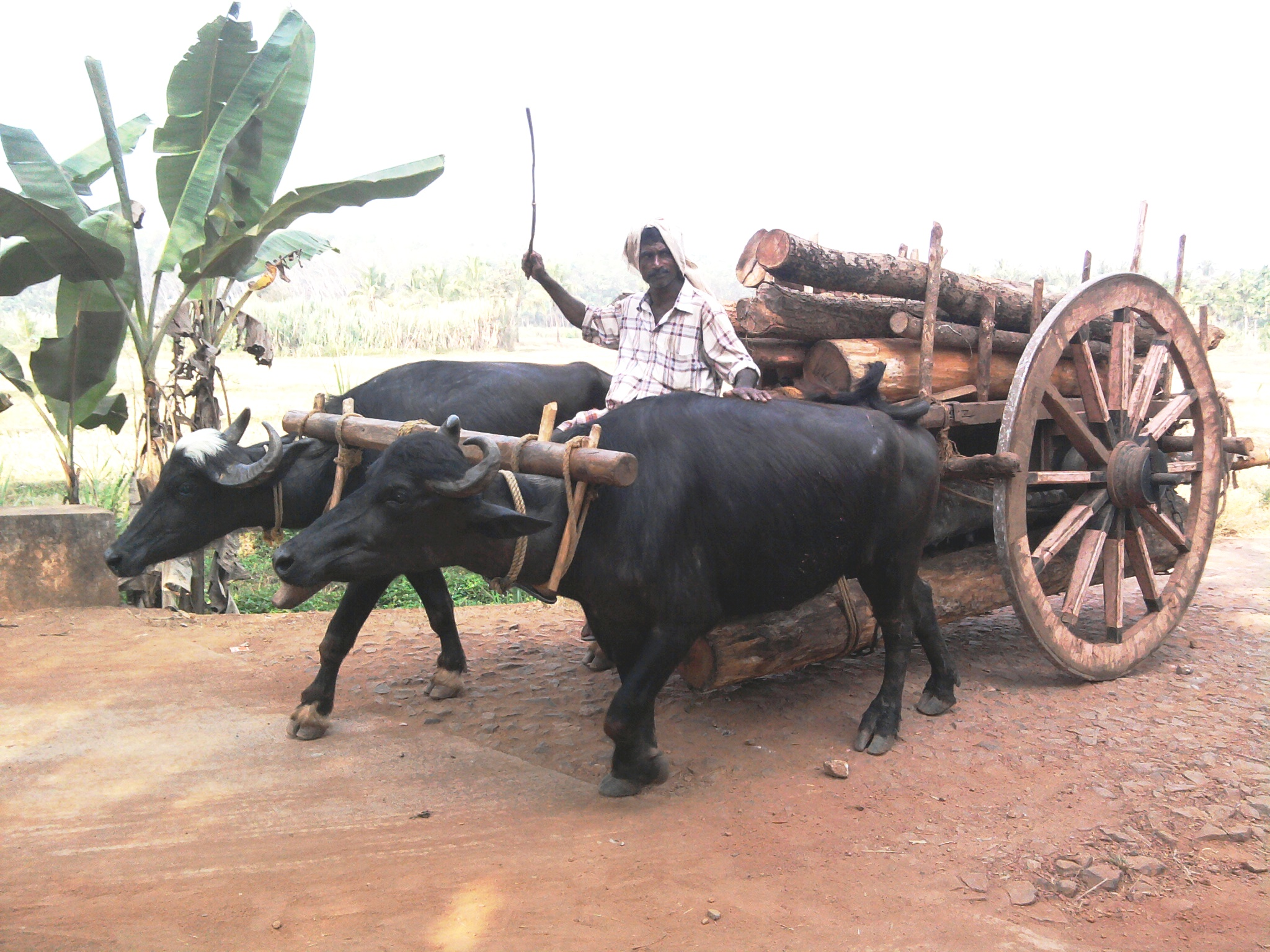
A bandy heavily loaded with timber

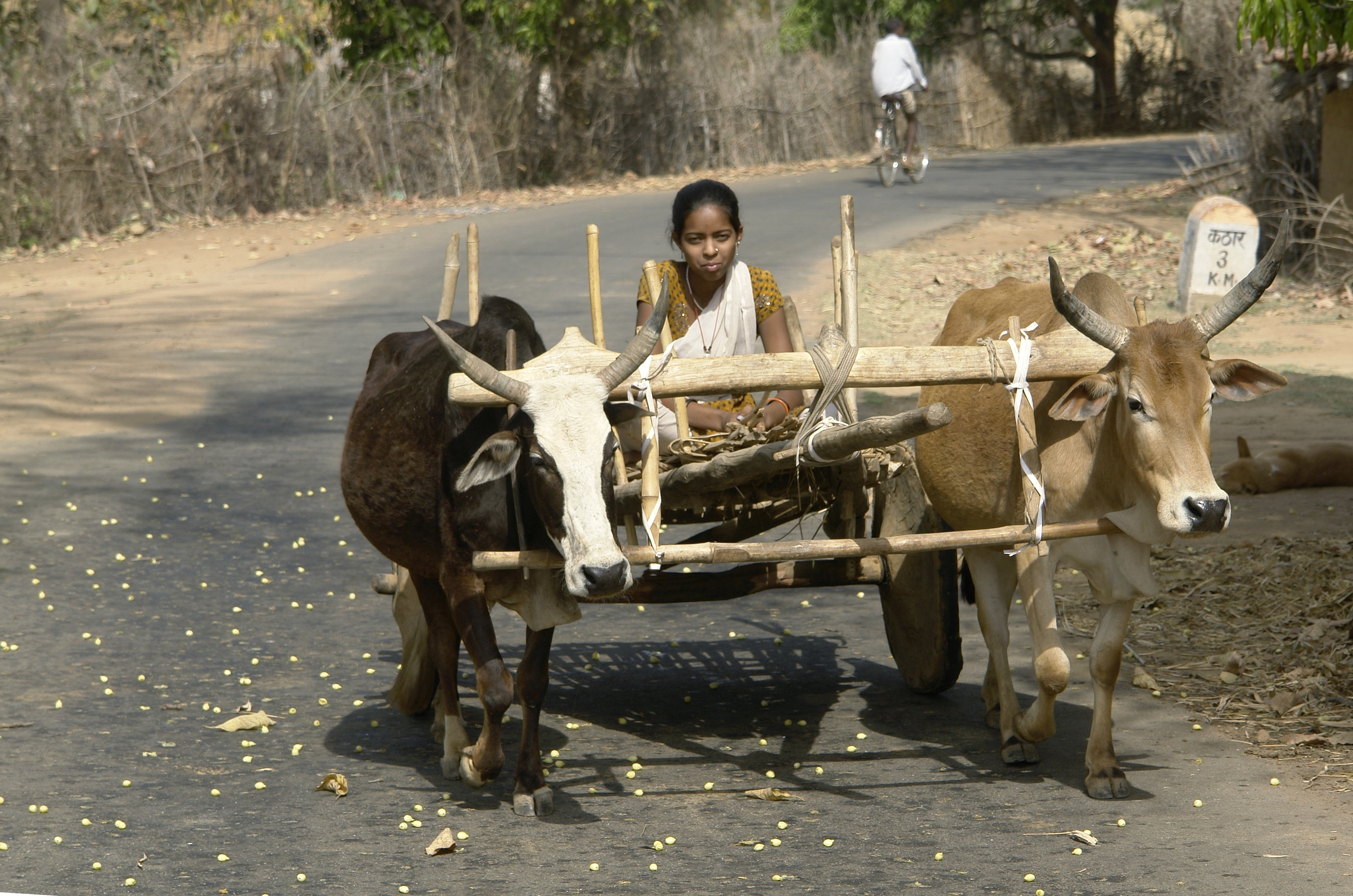
Closeup of yoking style; note also the rough-hewn solid disc wheels

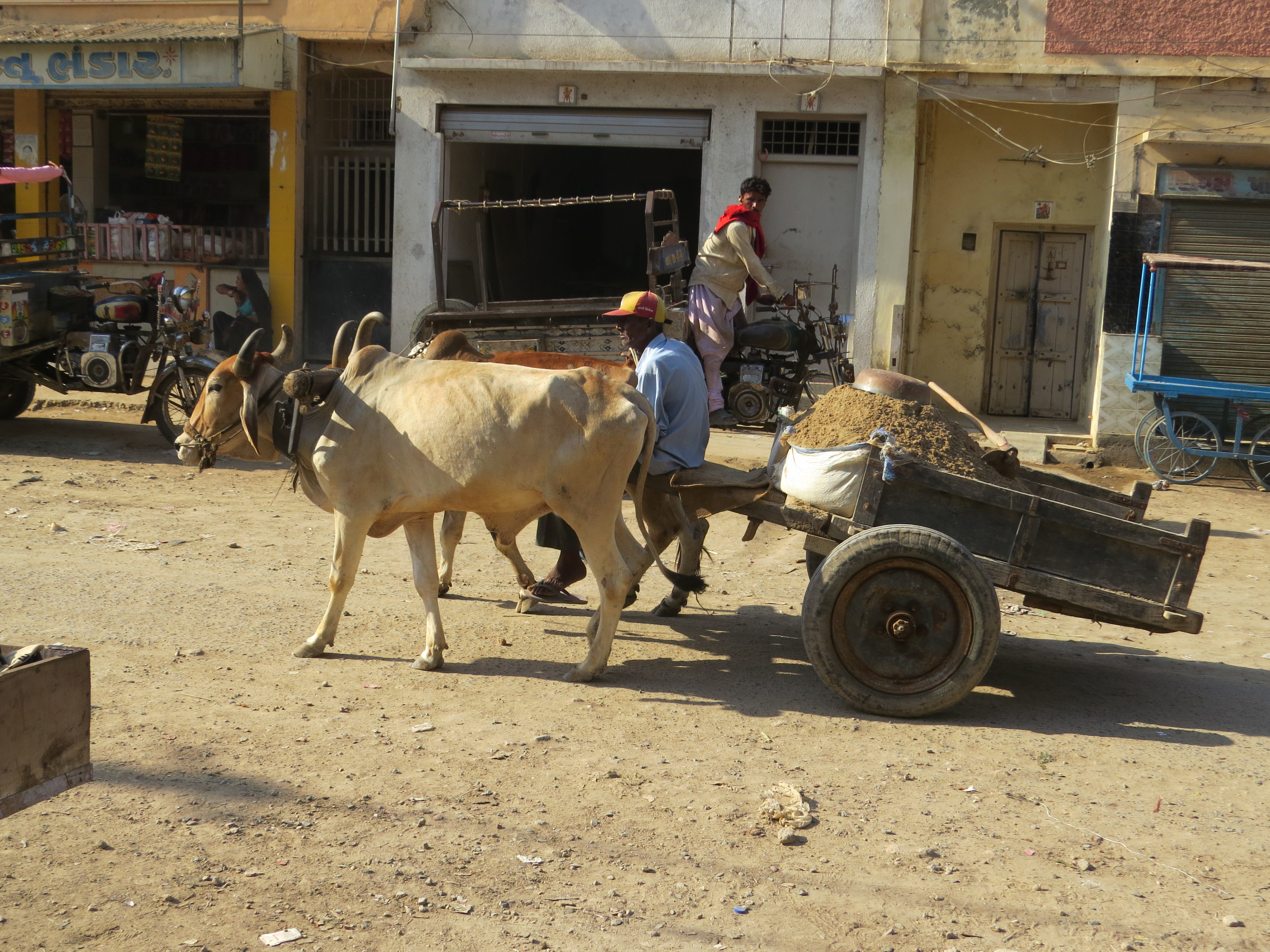
A modern bandy; note the bandyman is sitting on the yoke pole
