= Anne Joseph Hippolyte de Maurès, Comte de Malartic =

French colonial governor (1730–1800)

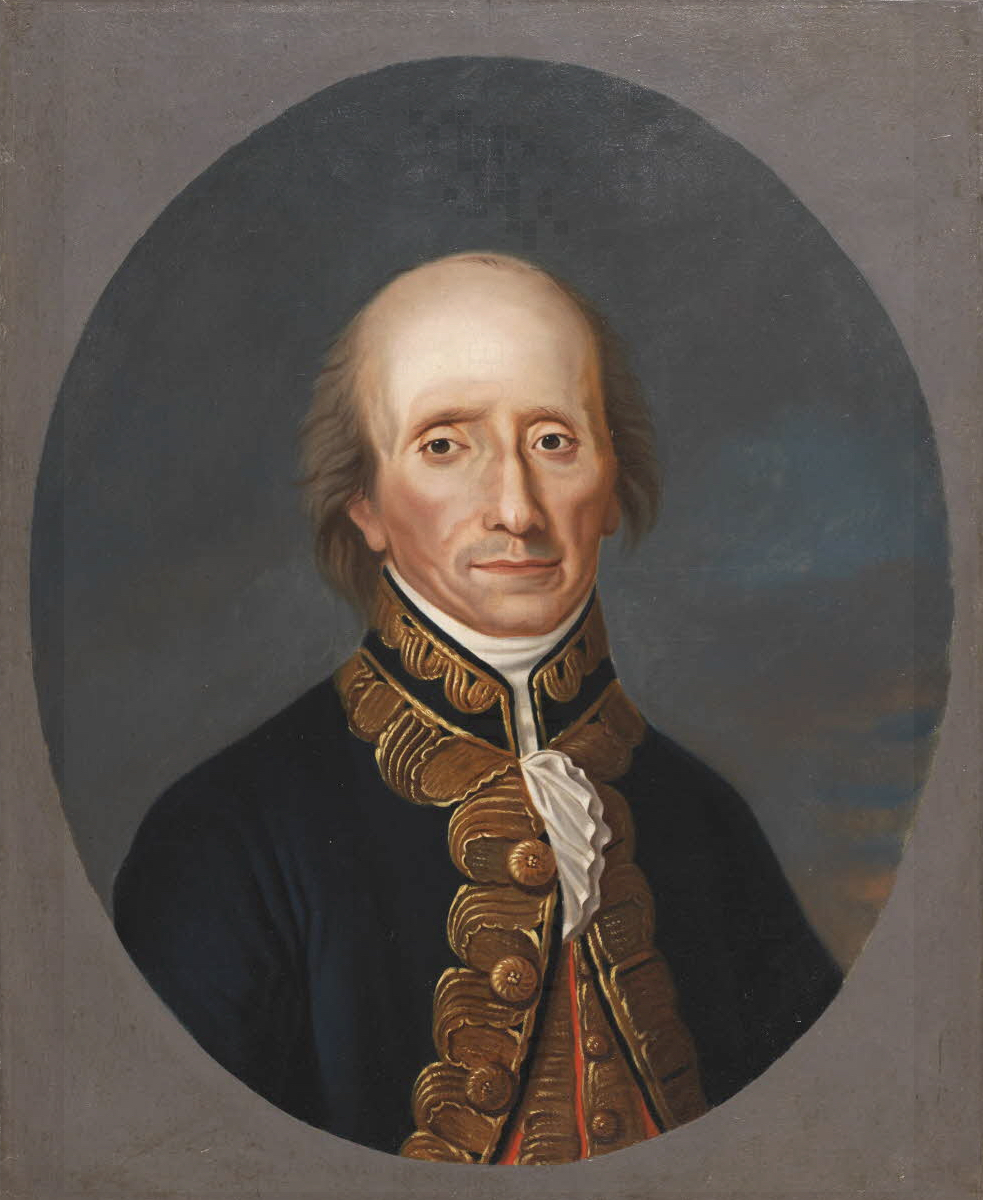
- Born: Anne Joseph Hippolyte de Malartic; 3 July 1730; Montauban (Kingdom of France)
- Died: 28 July 1800; Port Louis
- Other name: Le Père de la Colonie
- Occupations: Governor, colonizer, soldier
- Awards: Knight of the Royal and Military Order of Saint Louis (after 1758)

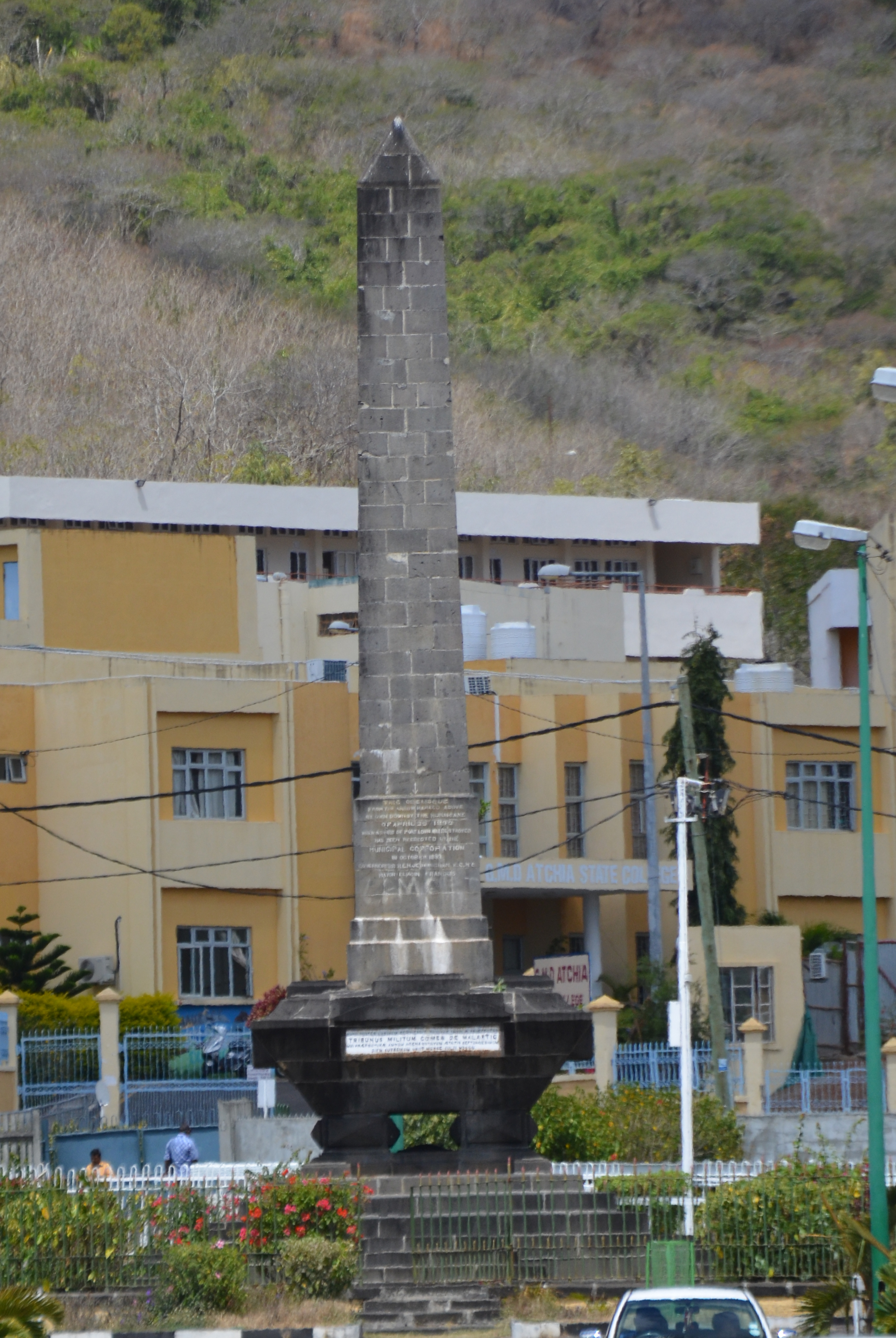
Grave of Malartic in Port-Louis

Anne Joseph Hippolyte de Maurès, Comte de Malartic (3 July 1730, Montauban - 28 July 1800, Port-Louis, Mauritius) was a French colonial governor and general, notable for his service in Canada and Mauritius.

During the French Revolutionary period, Malartic refused to give sailor captain Robert Surcouf a letter of marque, but ordered Surcouf's ship, the Émilie to go to the Seychelles to purchase tortoises as food for Isle de France.

In June 1796, he met the agents of the Directory who had come to apply the Law of 4 February 1794. But in the face of pressure from the colonists, he forcibly return them to France.

== Fate ==
Governor Malartic died at the age of 70. He suffered a stroke on 26 July 1800 while going to church, and died two days later.

The Canadian town of Malartic is named after him.
