= Sullimany (1797 ship) =

History

Great Britain
- Name: Solamany
- Launched: 1779, (Note: Only one source gives this date, suggesting the possibility that it represents a typo, transposing 79 for 97.) or 1795, or 1797, or 1799, Demaun
- Fate: Still listed at Bombay c.1840

General characteristics
- Tons burthen: 642, 679, or 689 (bm)

Sullimany (or Solimany, or Solamany, or Sullimaney, or Sulamany, or Solamony), was built at Demaun between 1795 and 1799, registered in Bombay after 1803, and was still sailing c.1840. She was originally a country ship. (The British East India Company's monopoly on the trade between the Far East and England meant that she traded east of the Cape of Good Hope and west of Cape Horn.) A French privateer captured her in 1799, but an East Indiaman fortuitously recaptured her shortly thereafter. She also served as a transport in two British military campaigns.

== Career ==
On 4 March 1799, the French privateer Heureux captured Solimany off Nagore. (Note: This may have been the privateer Heureux commissioned at Île de France in July 1798 under the command of the noted corsair Jean-Marie Dutertre.) Dublin recaptured Solimany, Captain Hamed Pelley, master, of eight guns. Four men of her crew of lascars had escaped when she was captured. Solimany had a prize crew of seven French men and a Swede onboard. She was carrying a cargo of "sundry articles" and was on her way to Mauritius when Dublin recaptured her after a five-hour chase.

In 1801 the British government hired a number of transports to support Major-General Sir David Baird's expedition to the Red Sea. Baird was in command of the Indian army that was going to Egypt to help General Ralph Abercromby expel the French there.

In 1811 the British government, under the auspices of Lord Minto hired a large number of transport vessels, Sullimany among them, for the invasion of Java.

In March 1816, Sullimany, Ringrose, master, sailed from Bombay with cargoes for Muscat, Bushire, and Bussorah. She stopped first at Muscat, a known slave-trading port. There she took on board 14 Negroes. Ringrose objected, stating that they were slaves and that carrying them risked the seizure of the ship if they encountered a British naval vessel. The "Nacoda" stated that the Negroes were passengers. (Note: The original meaning of "Nacoda" was the owner of the vessel traveling aboard it and acting as his own supercargo.) Ringrose stated that the people could go aboard if the Nacoda accepted the consequences. Sullimany then sailed from Muscat on 24 May with the Negroes aboard, bound for Bushire.

On 17 June 1816 HMS Favorite, Captain the Honourable James Ashley Maude, detained Sullimany and sent her into Bombay for adjudication. The Vice admiralty court found that Sullimany was sailing under the British flag, under the command of a British subject, owned by a British subject, and navigating under the laws of the United Kingdom. He ruled that she had been carrying 14 Negro slaves, in contravention of British law, and declared them forfeit to His Majesty.

Year	Master	Owner	Notes
1801-1804		Hussan Abdullah	Built at Demaun in 1797
1809	Joseph Dodds	Oramjee Cawajee	Built at Demaun in 1797
1816	Ringrose	Hadjee Seroor bin Yacoob & Ebrahim bin Hussan Sumt	Transported slaves
1819	Robert Suxpitch	Framjee Cowasjee	Built at Demaun in 1799
1829	R. Wemyss	Framjee Cowasjee	Repaired in Bombay in 1816

The barque Sulimony caught fire on 28 February 1841 off Kidderpore Dockyard. The fire had begun among some bales of cotton and was soon subdued; arson was not suspected.
