= Surcouf =

Surcouf may refer to:

== People ==
- Édouard Surcouf (1862–1938), French engineer, dirigible designer and pilot, and industrialist
- Jacques Surcouf (1873–1934), French entomologist
- Marie Surcouf (1863–1928), French balloonist and feminist
- Nicolas Surcouf (1770–1848), French privateer and shipowner, brother of Robert Surcouf
- Robert Surcouf (1773–1827), French privateer, slave trader and shipowner

== Ships ==
- French ship Surcouf, five ships named after Robert Surcouf

== Works about Robert Surcouf ==
- Surcouf (film), a 1924 French silent film serial
- Surcouf (opéra comique), an 1887 French opéra comique
- The Sea Pirate, original title Surcouf, le tigre des sept mers, a 1966 French-Italian-Spanish adventure film

== See also ==
- Robert Surcouf de Maisonneuve (1671–c. 1720), French privateer, an ancestor of Robert Surcouf
