= Balasore Roads =

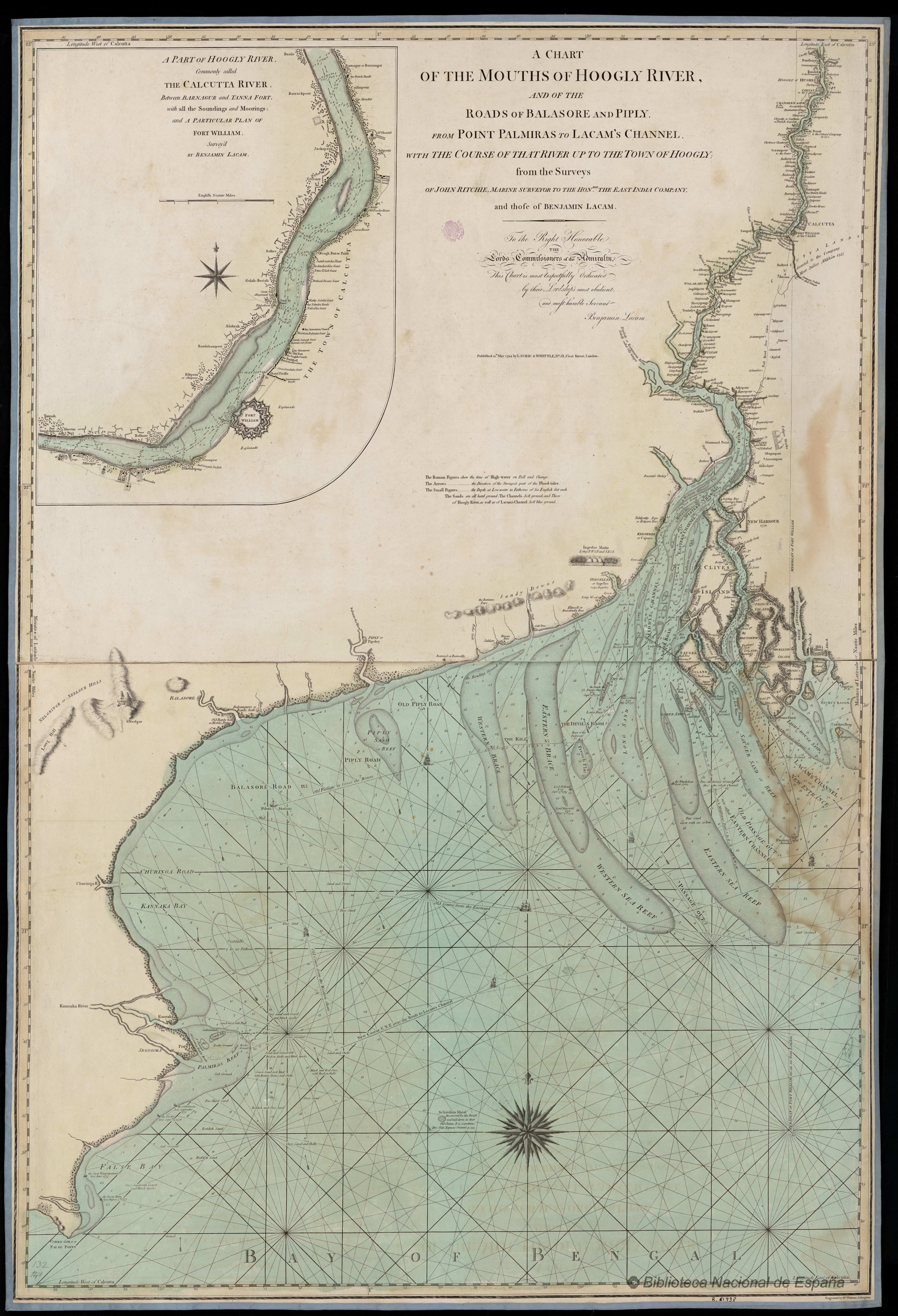
British chart of Balasore Roads, 1794.

Balasore Roads is a roadstead (a sheltered anchorage), on the Indian coast near Balasore. It was the location of the Bengal Pilot Service pilot boarding station (see chart). It was considered to be a generally safe anchorage, with depths varying from 5 to 15 fathoms, and with the sea bottom consisting of mud and sand.

The entrance to the Hooghly River was considered to be the most difficult of any river in India, and the river pilot station was located near the mouth of the river.

During the French Revolutionary and Napoleonic Wars French privateer captains such as Jean-François Hodoul and Robert Surcouf would cruise the mouth of the Hooghly River hoping to capture vessels anchored in the Roads, or proceeding to or from Calcutta. The French captured both pilot vessels such as Cartier, and large East Indiamen such as Triton.

== See also ==
- roadstead in wiktionary
