= Joseph Potier =

French privateer and slave trader

Joseph Potier (5 May 1768, Saint-Malo — 10 November 1830) was a French privateer and slave trader. He was one of the lieutenants of Robert Surcouf.

== Early life ==
Joseph Potier was born to a family of low nobility of Saint-Malo. His mother was a descendant of Robert Surcouf de Maisonneuve, a Breton privateer. and he was therefore a distant cousin to Robert Surcouf.

== Merchant navy captain ==
Potier started sailing as a boy on the ships that his father equipped and sent out to Guinea and the Caribbean. He rose to become an officer in the merchant marine and eventually to Captain on 28 April 1792. With this rank, he served as first officer on the Aimable-Rose, under Captain de La Coudraie.

== French Navy in the Revolution ==
Returning to France during the French Revolution and the Reign of Terror, he enlisted in the French Navy as an Ensign; he was appointed to a frigate bound for the Caribbean, which remained there for a few months before decommissioning in the USA. For fear of being considered an émigré, he returned to France, where he served in the general staff of Brest harbour until late 1795. After the Battle of Quiberon, he commanded a company of sailors that hunted down the surviving émigrés.

== Privateer ==
Having obtained a release from Navy duty in late 1795, Potier enlisted on the privateer Heureuse-Nouvelle as first officer. Heureuse-Nouvelle was armed with 22 guns and had a crew of 130 men; she captured a number of prizes until 28 January 1798, when a British squadron under Captain Edward Pellew comprising HMS Indefatigable, Cambrian, and the hired armed lugger Duke of York captured her. The British took Potier prisoner.

Exchanged, Potier returned to Brest, where he re-entered the Navy. On 23 September 1800, he was released from duty. The following year, he enlisted as first officer on the three-masted merchantman Courrier de l'Ile de France, under Captain Duval; when she arrived at Port Louis, Duval gave command of the ship to Potier for a cruise to Batavia, and return to Mauritius.

Returning to France on 29 March 1803, Potier witnessed the breakdown of the Treaty of Amiens and the outbreak of the War of the Third Coalition in May. On 2 January 1804, Robert Surcouf gave him command of the 14-gun privateer Confiance. Potier led several campaigns on Confiance, during which he captured two British merchantmen, one loaded with soap and the other with spirits.

In February 1807, Surcouf enlisted Potier as first officer on his new privateer Revenant. After Revenant returned to Port-Louis from her first campaign, on 31 January 1808, Surcouf gave Potier command of the ship on 2 April.

In late April, as Revenant was completing her preparations and plotting her route, a prize taken by the privateer Adèle gave news of the new war between France and Portugal; she also brought intelligence about the Conceçáo-de-Santo-Antonio, a 64-gun ship of the line armed en flûte in Goa, bound for Rio de Janeiro and Lisbon. Surcouf gave Portier the mission to intercept, and Revenant departed Port-Louis on 30 April. She arrived in her patrol zone on 17 May and detected her target on the 24th. Revenant captured Conceçáo-de-Santo-Antonio after a one-hour battle. Potier put a prize crew under First Lieutenant Fonroc on Conceçáo, and returned to Mauritius one month later with his prize.

Potier left Revenant, which was sent back to Saint-Malo en aventurier with colonial goods. next, he took command of the 18-gun 600-ton Diamant, a British prize taken by the privateer Napoléon after a three-day chase. In mid-October, Diamant left Mauritius, also armed en aventurier with goods and passengers, and bound for Lorient. She arrived in Quiberon Bay in the evening of 21 January 1809 and ran into the British blockade; a frigate gave chase, but Potier managed to escape by throwing his artillery overboard. (Note: Cunat (p.418) alleges that by nightfall, Potier had a launch fitted with a lantern and sent away as a decoy to lure the frigate. This story has been attributed to Robert Surcouf. A similar ploy is used in the novel Master and Commander by the fictional Captain Aubrey in 1800-01.) Diamant arrived off Bordeaux on the 23rd, where a storm forced Potier to have his masts cut down to save his ship; he finally arrived in Bordeaux harbour on the 25th.

On his return to Saint-Malo, Portier co-founded the ship-owning company Joseph Potier et Harembert. The company was then responsible for arming a number of privateers.

== Carrying slaves in the Bourbon Restoration ==
During the Bourbon Restoration, Portier armed the slave ship Africain, on which he ferried slaves from Guinea to Martinique. Africain ended her career in Saint-Malo on 25 July 1816, after which Potier sailed only once more, on Narcisse, in 1819.

== Bibliography ==
- Charlier, Jean-Michel; Hubinon, Victor (1991). Surcouf - Terreur des mers. Dupuis. ISBN 978-2800117997.
- Cunat, Charles (1857). Saint-Malo illustré par ses marins (in French). Imprimerie de F. Péalat.
- Gallois, Napoléon (1847). Les Corsaires français sous la République et l'Empire (in French). Vol. 2. Julien, Lanier et compagnie.
- Lepelley, Roger (2000). La Fin d'un empire : les derniers jours de l'Isle de France et de l'Isle Bonaparte : 1809 - 1810. Economica. ISBN 2-7178-4148-2.
