= Hercules (1801 ship) =

History

United Kingdom
- Name: Hercules
- Namesake: Hercules
- Owner: Temple & Co.
- Builder: Temple shipbuilders, South Shields
- Launched: 1801
- Captured: c. November 1805

General characteristics
- Tons burthen: 359, or 395, or 406, or 485 (bm)
- Propulsion: Sail
- Complement: 1801: 36; 1803: 30
- Armament: 1801: 10 × 6-pounder guns; 1801: 10 × 12 & 6-pounder guns; 1803: 14 12 & 9-pounder guns; At capture: 4 × 6-pounder guns + 6 × 18-pounder carronades

Hercules was a sailing ship built in 1801 at South Shields, England. She made one trip transporting convicts to Port Jackson. She made two trips for the British East India Company (EIC), and was homeward bound from the second of these when the French privateer Napoleon captured her off the Cape of Good Hope.

== Career ==
Hercules appears in Lloyd's Register in 1801 with Bates, master, Temple & Co. owners, and trade London–Botany Bay.

On 20 August 1801 Captain Luckyn Betts received a letter of marque for Hercules.

Hercules sailed from Ireland on 29 November 1801, and arrived at Port Jackson on 26 June 1802. Hercules had sailed via Rio de Janeiro and the Cape of Good Hope, which she reached on 12 April 1802. In Ireland she had embarked 140 male and 25 female convicts. Forty-four male convicts died on the voyage.

Hercules left Port Jackson on 12 August bound for China. By 26 October she was at Whampoa. Homeward bound, she crossed the Second Bar - about 20 miles before Whampoa — on 3 January 1803, reached St Helena on 14 April, and arrived at The Downs on 19 June.

For her next voyage Hercules received a new master, and so required a new letter of marque, if he wanted one. Richard Rabe(g?) received his letter of marque on 8 October 1803.

== Capture ==
The Register of Shipping for 1805 shows Hercules with Bates, master, and S. Temple, owner. Her trade is shown as London—Botany Bay.

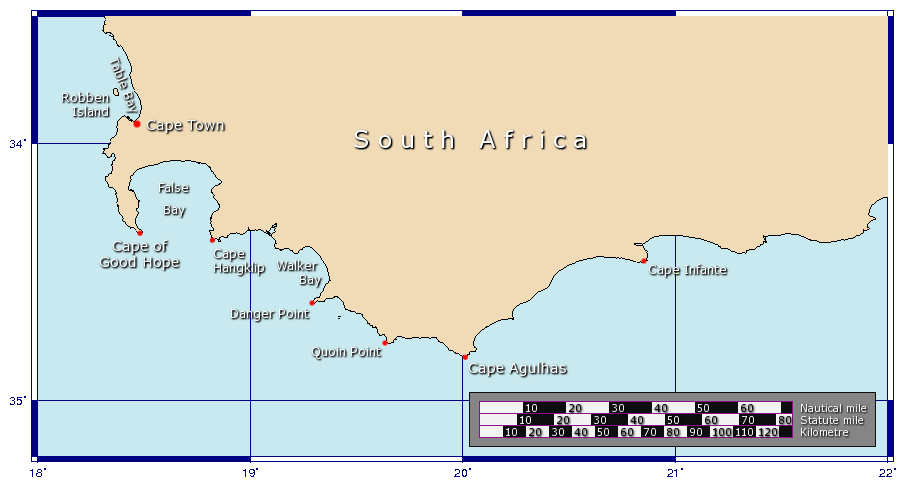
Map showing the location of Cape Agulhas relative to the Cape of Good Hope.

As Hercules was returning to England from Bombay in 1805, the French privateer Napoleon captured her off Cape Agulhas and sent her into Port Louis. (Note: Napoleon was under the command of Captain Malo le Nouvel. She was armed with 30 guns and had a crew of 180 men.). At her capture, Hercules was carrying a cargo of cotton. In November 1805, Napoleon brought the prisoners from Hercules and from the whaler Diamond into the Cape Colony, then in Dutch hands. (Note: Napoleon had captured Diamond on 22 October in the Mozambique Channel. Diamond was armed with 18 guns. The French renamed her Diamant.) There Alex Tennant, resident in the Cape, arranged at his own expense, for the prisoners to be sent to St Helena, where they arrived in January 1806.
