= HMS Alphea =

History

United Kingdom
- Name: HMS Alphea
- Ordered: 2 April 1804
- Laid down: 1804
- Launched: 1806
- Commissioned: March 1806
- Fate: Blown up in action 1813

General characteristics (Note: All measurements are for the class per Winfield.)
- Class & type: Adonis-class
- Type: Cutter, converted to schooner
- Tons burthen: 110 93/94 (bm)
- Length: 68 ft 2 in (20.8 m) (overall); 50 ft 5 5/8 in (15.4 m) (keel)
- Beam: 20 ft 4 in (6.2 m)
- Depth of hold: 10 ft 3 in (3.1 m)
- Propulsion: Sails
- Sail plan: Schooner
- Complement: 35
- Armament: 10 × 18-pounder carronades

HMS Alphea was built of Bermudan pencil cedar as a cutter and launched in 1804. Later she was converted to a schooner. She captured a number of small prizes before September 1813 when she blew up in a single-ship action with the loss of her entire crew.

== Career ==
Alphea was commissioned in March 1806 under Lieutenant J. Marston. She underwent repairs at Plymouth between 6 September 1806 and 12 January 1807. On 27 March 1808, Boadicea, Medusa, cutter Alphea, and schooner Ant captured 25 French fishing vessels. (Note: A seaman's share of the prize money was 14s 2 3/4d, or about two weeks' wages.) Alphea herself was altered to a schooner at Portsmouth between December 1808 and February 1809.

On 26 April 1809, Alphea recaptured Pallas. Then on 14 August Alphea recaptured the galliot Zeemeuw. Five days later she recaptured the galliot Frederick William. She was also in sight when Podargus recaptured the Margaretha. Alphea also shared in the proceeds of the capture of the French 14-gun privateer lugger Maraudeur by Rinaldo.

Lieutenant William Gibbons replaced Marston in 1811.

On 23 October a court martial aboard Salvador del Mundo in the Hamoaze dismissed Lieutenant Gibbons from Alphea. On 14 August he had discovered that Mrs. Bentley, the wife of a Royal Marine corporal, was on board Alphea after he had ordered that she not be admitted to the ship. He ordered her put on a boat and taken to shore, but when she became abusive, he told the boat crew to take her no farther than a buoy and leave her there. She was there a quarter of an hour when a boat from the shore took her off. Gibbons stated that he did not know that she was pregnant and that he thought no harm would come to her as he and 13 men had once stood on the buoy. The court martial found that Gibbon's behavior, though highly improper and reprehensible, did not contravene Article 33 of the Articles of War. (Note: Mrs. Bentley sued Gibbons. A jury awarded her £500. Gibbons never served on a ship again, but remained on the retired list and died a captain.)

In 1812 Lieutenant Thomas William Jones replaced Gibbons. He sailed Alphea for North America on 17 May 1812. On 13 August she was in company when Jason captured William Tell. When Alphea returned to Britain, the Admiralty dismissed Jones from his command for having detained an American vessel at the commencement of the war with the U.S., in advance of having received authorization.

In May 1813 Alphea, under the command of Lieutenant M'Donald, supported a small squadron of three British brigs, Lyra, Royalist, and Sparrow, which had come to aid the Spanish garrison at Castro Urdiales, which a French force was besieging. The French eventually prevailed and the British vessels, including Alphea, helped evacuate the Spanish troops and townspeople. Alphea brought the dispatches to Admiral Lord Keith.

== Loss ==
The Admiralty restored Jones to command of Alphea and assigned her to the Channel station for the protection of trade. She sailed from Dartmouth on 7 September on a cruise. On 9 September 1813 she encountered, south-west of Start Point, the French 14-gun privateer cutter Renard under the command of French captain Leroux-Desrochettes, and owned by the legendary Robert Surcouf. Renard was armed with eight 8-pounder carronades and four 4-pounder guns and had a crew of 50 men; Alphea had 41, or 36.

Renard approached, but then retreated when she realized that Alphea was a man of war. The chase began at 5pm but Alphea was not able to get close until 1 a.m., when she began to fire her bow chasers. The two vessels exchanged broadsides and at one point Alphea repulsed a boarding attempt, causing heavy casualties to the French. The action continued until 3:30 a.m. when Alphea suddenly exploded. (There was speculation that the cause was hand grenades thrown from Renard that exploded in the magazine.))

There were no reported survivors. (The French reported seeing four men in the water, but they disappeared before Renard could reach them. French accounts report that Renard could not maneuver in the calm winds and the men in the water, having been blinded by the explosion, could not swim toward her.)

Renard lost five men killed and 31 wounded, including her captain, who had an arm shot away and later died of his injuries. Renard returned to France with only 13 able-bodied men.
