= Diamond (1798 ship) =

History

Great Britain
- Name: Diamond
- Owner: 1800:Beatson & Co.; 1801:Parry & Co.; 1805:J. Hill & Co.
- Builder: Patrick Beatson, Quebec
- Launched: 1798
- Captured: October 1805
- Notes: Clayton has some discrepant information re Diamond's career as a whaler, but the information in the other sources is more compelling and consistent across sources.

France
- Name: Diamant
- Acquired: October 1805 By capture
- Decommissioned: January 1809
- Fate: Decommissioned 1809

General characteristics
- Type: Full-rigged ship
- Tons burthen: 443, or 468, or 512, or 521 (bm); 600 (French tons "of load")
- Length: 119 ft 0 in (36.3 m)
- Propulsion: Sail
- Complement: 1801: 30; 1804:25
- Armament: 1801:16 × 9-pounder guns; 1804:14 × 9-pounder guns; 1808:18 × 9-pounder guns
- Notes: Two decks

Diamond was launched in 1798 at Quebec. French privateers captured her three times, the third time retaining her. In between she sailed as a slave ship in the triangular trade in enslaved people. Her third capture occurred while she was on a whaling voyage. Her last voyage took her from Île de France to Bordeaux where she was decommissioned in January 1809.

== British career ==
Diamond was the first 500-ton (bm) vessel built at Quebec since the British occupation. (Note: One source gives her launch year as 1799 rather than 1798.)

Diamond entered Lloyd's Register in 1800 with Anderson, master, Beatson, owner, and trade London-Halifax.

The French privateer Grand Décidé captured "The Diamond Transport, from Halifax to Portsmouth" around end-October 1800. (Note: Fisgard captured Grand Décidé around 20 October.) On 1 November the Royal Navy Cutter Viper recaptured Diamond. Viper sent Diamond into Falmouth, where she arrived on 3 November.

In 1801 Diamond's ownership changed. The entry in the online copy of Lloyd's Register is illegible, but the entry in the 1802 issue shows her master as Clark, her owner as Parry & Co., and her trade as London-Africa.

On 24 August 1801 Captain James Clark received a letter of marque. Diamond then made two under Clark's command transporting enslaved people.

1st voyage transporting enslaved people (1801–1802): Diamond left London on 31 August 1801. In 1801, 147 vessels sailed from English ports, bound for Africa to acquire and transport enslaved people; 23 of these vessels sailed from London.

Diamond then delivered 391 captives to Trinidad, where she arrived on 1 March 1802. She returned to London on 13 June.

2nd voyage transporting enslaved people (1802–1803): Diamond left London on 13 September 1802. In 1802, 155 vessels sailed from English ports, bound for Africa to acquire and transport enslaved people; 30 of these vessels sailed from London.

Diamond arrived at Havana, Cuba, on 1 April 1803. There she landed 389 captives. As Diamond was returning from Havana on 9 August she encountered the French privateer Bellona, which took her captive. However, HMS Goliath recaptured Diamond on the 12th and sent her into The Downs. A few days later Diamond ran on shore a few miles below Gravesend and bilged. Diamond arrived back in London on 31 August.

Next, Diamond became a whaling ship for J. Hill & Co., with destination the South Seas. Captain Mark Munro (or Monro) received a letter of marque on 31 August 1804, and sailed her from Britain on 17 September 1804 with destination Isle of Desolation. She was at Desolation on 25 February 1805. She was also reported to have been "all well" there on 5 May. An English folk song named 'Bonny Ship The Diamond' has her whaling by Greenland in the Davis Strait, set out from Peterhead, with the hopes of the crew pinned on retiring from their seafaring career to raise children with their 'bonnie lassies', thanks to the cargo of whale oil they will return with. This also gives us the name of its Captain at this time as Gibbons.

On 10 November, the French privateer Napoléon captured Diamond in the Mozambique Channel, after a three-day chase. Then on 10 December Napoléon captured Hercules. The capture occurred off Cape Agulhas as Hercules was returning to England from Bombay, and Napoléon sent her into Port Louis. At her capture, Hercules was carrying a cargo of cotton. (Note: Napoléon was under the command of Captain Malo le Nouvel. She was armed with 30 guns and had a crew of 180 men. HMS Narcissus captured Napoleon on 25 December.) In November 1805, Napoléon brought the prisoners from Hercules and from Diamond into the Cape Colony, then in Dutch hands. There Alex Tennant, resident in the Cape, arranged at his own expense for the prisoners to be sent to St Helena. The Danish ship Beshriermerin arrived at St Helena on 6 January 1806 with the British crews.

== French career ==
The French renamed Diamond Diamant. An ambiguous report has "The Napoleon, prize of the Diamant, consignees of the Lenouvelle brothers, three masted vessel, of about 400 tons, copper-lined, to be sold 5 April [1806] by notary Guérin."

At Île de France the French commissioned Diamant in September 1808 under the command of Captain Joseph Potier "en guerre et en marchandises", that is an armed merchantman that was also authorised to take prizes should the opportunity arise. In mid-October, Diamant left Mauritius, bound for Lorient. She arrived in Quiberon Bay in the evening of 21 January 1809 and ran into the British blockade; a frigate gave chase, but Potier managed to escape by throwing his artillery overboard. Diamant arrived off Bordeaux on the 23rd, where a storm forced Potier to cut down her masts to save the ship; he finally arrived in Bordeaux harbour on the 25th. She was decommissioned after her arrival at Bordeaux in January 1809.
