= Robert Surcouf =

French privateer, businessman and slave trader (1773–1827)

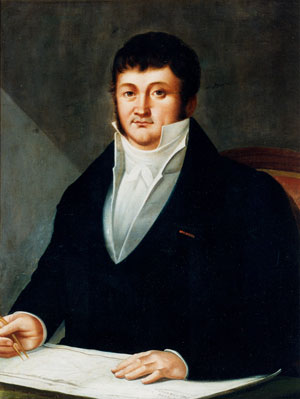
- Surcouf c. 1820
- Born: 12 December 1773; Saint-Malo, Brittany, Kingdom of France
- Died: 8 July 1827 (aged 53); Saint-Servan, Brittany, Kingdom of France
- Spouse: Marie Blaize
- Relatives: Brother to Nicolas Surcouf; Cousin to Joseph Potier
- Military career
- Allegiance: (First French Empire) French Empire (Bourbon Restoration in France) Kingdom of France
- Branch: (France) French Navy (briefly)
- Service years: 1798–1809
- Rank: Privateer
- Commands: Émilie; Clarisse; Confiance; Revenant
- Awards: Sabre of honour Legion of Honour
- Other work: ship-owner of privateer and merchantmen

Signature
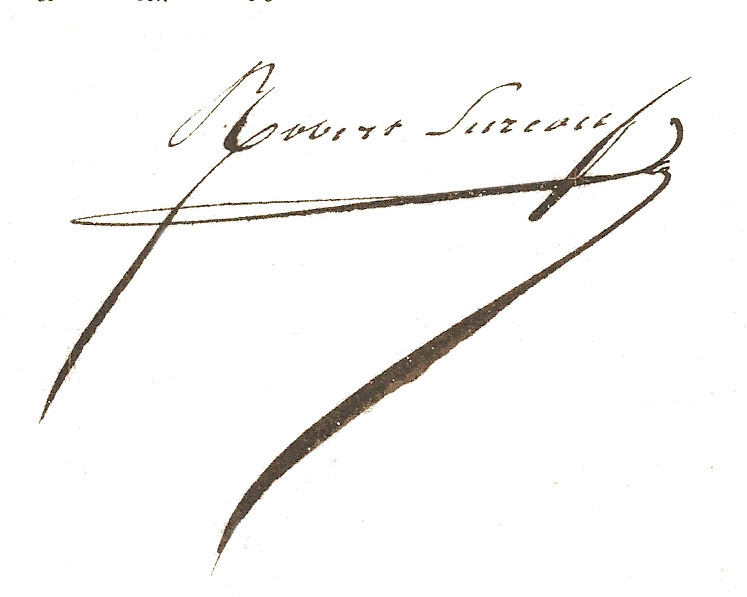

Robert Surcouf (French pronunciation: [ʁɔbɛʁ syʁkuf]; 12 December 1773 – 8 July 1827) was a French privateer, businessman and slave trader who operated in the Indian Ocean from 1789 to 1808 during the French Revolutionary and Napoleonic Wars. Capturing over 40 prizes, he later amassed a large fortune from a variety of commercial activities, such as ship-owning, privateering, slave trading and owning land.

Surcouf started his maritime career as an officer on the ships Aurore, Courrier d'Afrique, and Navigateur. Having risen to the rank of captain, he illegally engaged in slave trading onboard the slave ship Créole. Surcouf then captained the merchantman Émilie, on which he engaged in commerce raiding despite lacking a letter of marque. He preyed on British shipping, capturing several merchantmen including the East Indiaman Triton, before returning to the Isle de France where his prizes were confiscated. Surcouf then returned to France, where he obtained prize money from the government. Returning to the Indian Ocean, Surcouf captained the privateers Clarisse and Confiance, raiding British, American, and Portuguese shipping. He captured the East Indiaman Kent on 7 October 1800. Returning to France, Surcouf was awarded the Legion of Honour and settled down as a businessman.

He briefly returned to the Indian Ocean in 1807 on the corvette Revenant before returning to France. There, Surcouf sponsored privateers and merchantmen, including slave ships. His privateers led campaigns against British trade in the Indian Ocean and the English Channel. The cutter Renard, a ship of his, achieved fame in her victory over HMS Alphea on 9 September 1812, with Alphea exploding after repulsing French attempts at boarding her. After the Bourbon Restoration in France, Surcouf organised fishing expeditions to Newfoundland and amassed a considerable fortune. He died in 1827 and was buried in Saint-Malo.

== Career ==
=== Youth ===
Robert Surcouf was born 12 December 1773 in Saint-Malo to a family of ship-owners. His father, Charles-Ange Surcouf de Boisgris, was the grandson of Robert Surcouf de Maisonneuve, who had captained the privateer Aimable during the reign of Louis XIV. On his mother's side, Robert was a distant relative of René Duguay-Trouin. When his parents sent him to Dinan college to become a priest, he fled at age thirteen to enlist on the merchantman Héron, which shuttled between Saint-Malo and Cádiz.

On 3 March 1789, he enlisted as a volunteer on the 700-ton Aurore, a slave ship bound for India under Captain Tardivet. Aurore sailed to Pondicherry and ferried troops bound for Isle de France. On her next journey, seeking to purchase slaves on the Horn of Africa, Aurore was wrecked in the Mozambique Channel, drowning 400 enslaved Africans chained in the orlop. Tardivet chartered the Portuguese San Antoine in October 1790 to return to Port-Louis, but had to divert to Sumatra because of the weather, and only returned to Port-Louis in late 1790, on a French ship via the French colony of Pondicherry. Promoted to officer, Surcouf enlisted on the Courrier d'Afrique, another slave ship, bound for Mozambique under Captain Garnier. Captain Tardivet then brought him over as Lieutenant on his new ship, Revanche. On Revanche, Surcouf made several expeditions off Madagascar.

Surcouf enlisted as a helmsman on the French Royal Navy's 20-gun fluyt French ship Bienvenue (17882), under Lieutenant Haumont, bound for France. Bienvenue arrived at Lorient on 2 January 1792, where Surcouf discovered the political changes France had undergone in the wake of the French Revolution.

After six months, Surcouf enlisted as a lieutenant on the slave ship Navigateur, under Captain Lejoliff. (Note: Granier gives the captain's name as "captain de Joliff" instead of "Lejoliff".) She departed on 27 August 1792 for Mozambique before sailing to Isle de France, where Surcouf was informed on his arrival of the outbreak of the French Revolutionary Wars.

Rising to the rank of captain, Surcouf took command of the brig Créole, a four-gun slave ship. He departed Isle de France on 3 June 1794 for a journey off Africa and Madagascar, and engaged again in slave trading, even though it had been prohibited by the National Convention and the Assembly of Île Bourbon. Upon his return to Isle de France, agents of the Committee of Public Safety inspected Créole for evidence of slave trading, but left empty-handed as Surcouf had already sold his enslaved cargo. When British naval forces arrived to blockade the Isle de France, he served as an auxiliary ensign on the 40-gun frigate Cybèle and participated in the inconclusive Action of 22 October 1794.

=== Cruise of Émilie and capture of Triton ===
Cruise of Émilie: from Port-Louis (Mauritius) to the Seychelles via La Réunion, on to Sumatra, the Gulf of Bengal, and return to Port-Louis.

In the spring in 1795, Surcouf took command of the 180-ton, privateer schooner Modeste, renamed Émilie, with a 32-man crew and four 6-pounder guns, armed by Malroux and Levaillant. Governor Malartic refused to provide a lettre de marque and ordered Émilie to go to the Seychelles to purchase tortoises as food for Isle de France.

Émilie departed on 3 September 1795 with a congé de navigation authorising her to defend herself, but not to take prizes as a privateer. The next day, she made a port call at Saint-Denis before cruising to Mahé. At Sainte Anne Island, two large British ships chased him, but he was able to evade them by sailing through the reefs, at night.

Surcouf then decided to sail to the Mergui Archipelago to load a rice cargo. On 8 December 1795, while in transit, cruising off the Ganges Delta, Surcouf captured his first prize, the ship Penguin, loaded with lumber, on which he detached a prize crew under Lieutenant Péru before sending her to Isle de France.

On 19 January 1796, Surcouf met the pilot ship Cartier leading two merchantmen, Russel and Sambolasse, through the Ganges delta. (Note: Russell was a pilot boat of 111 tons (bm), launched in 1770.) He attacked and captured them, finding the merchantmen to be carrying rice. After detaching prize crews, Surcouf transferred his command, along with his remaining 22 crew members and Émilie's four guns, to Cartier, which (according to Ambroise Louis Garneray) he renamed Hasard. Surcouf then sent Émilie, under Lieutenant Croizet, together with his prizes, to Isle de France.

On the night of 28 January, Surcouf captured the 12-gun Diana, loaded with 6,000 bags of rice. The next day, Cartier met a 26-gun Indiaman, Triton, armed with 12-pounders and a 150-man crew; having decided to attack, and recognising only too late the overwhelming superiority of his opponent, Surcouf, feeling threatened and unable to flee, decided to board her with his 26 men. (Note: Levot gives a figure of 17 men; Cunat, of 19.) After haranguing his men, he approached under a British flag, before hoisting French colours at the very last moment and launching a violent assault. In the ensuing 45-minute battle, Triton suffered five wounded and ten killed, including her captain, Captain Burnycat, and the first officer, Picket; The prisoners were transferred to Diana, which Surcouf released against a 30,000 rupee ransom.

Surcouf returned to Ile de France with his prizes, where he arrived on 10 March 1796, although Hasard was captured by HMS Victorious on the journey back. As Émilie had been armed as a merchant rather than a privateer, the prize court seized her prizes and sold them for the benefit of the State, although their capture was declared to be legal. Surcouf returned to France to claim his prize money, and on 3 September 1797, the government finally granted him 660,000 francs, of which he only received 80,000. (Note: Some sources state that the allowance was of 1,700,000 francs, of which Surcouf left two thirds to the Treasury.)

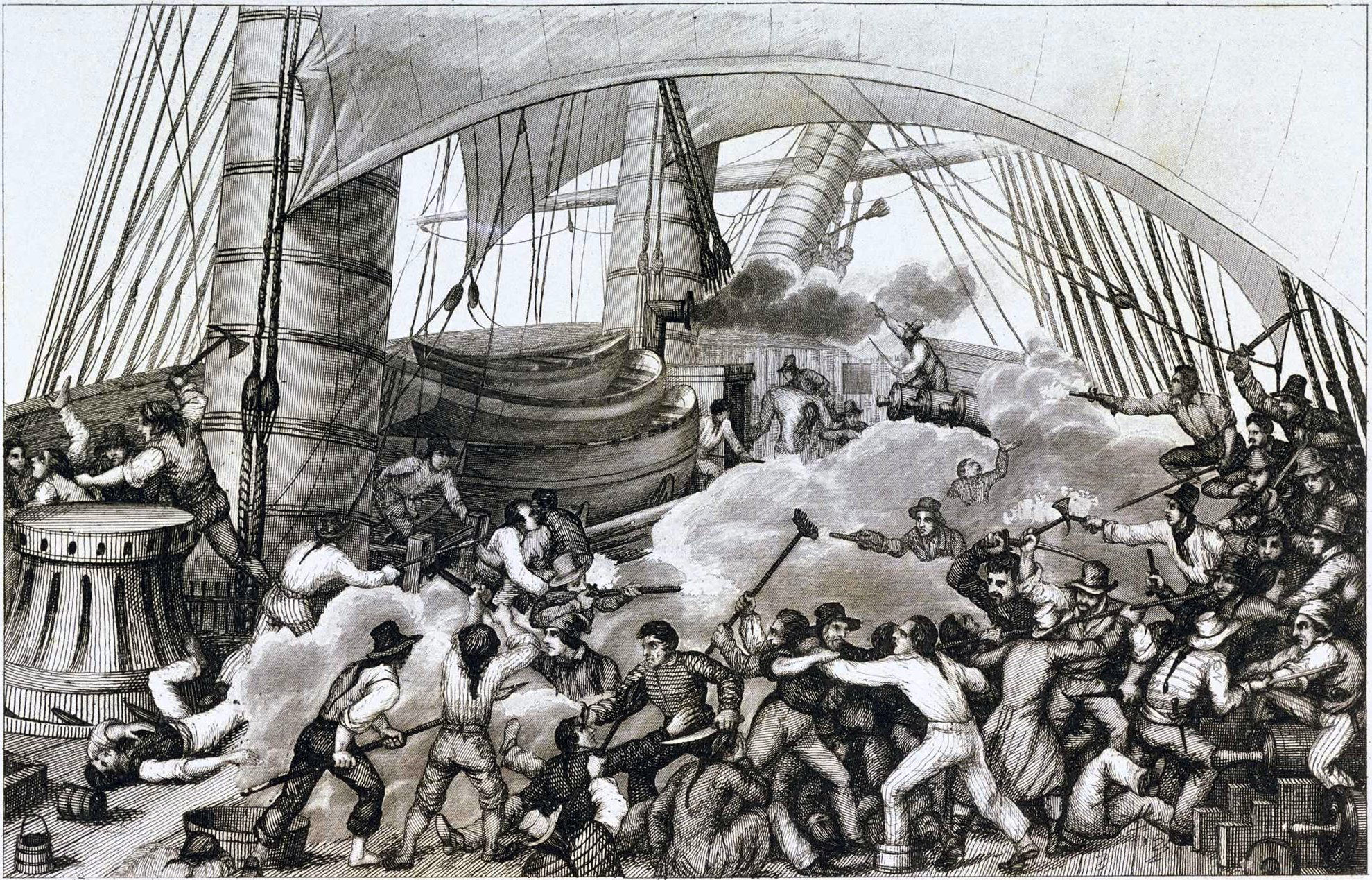
Boarding of Triton by the French corsair Hasard. Engraving by Ambroise-Louis Garneray

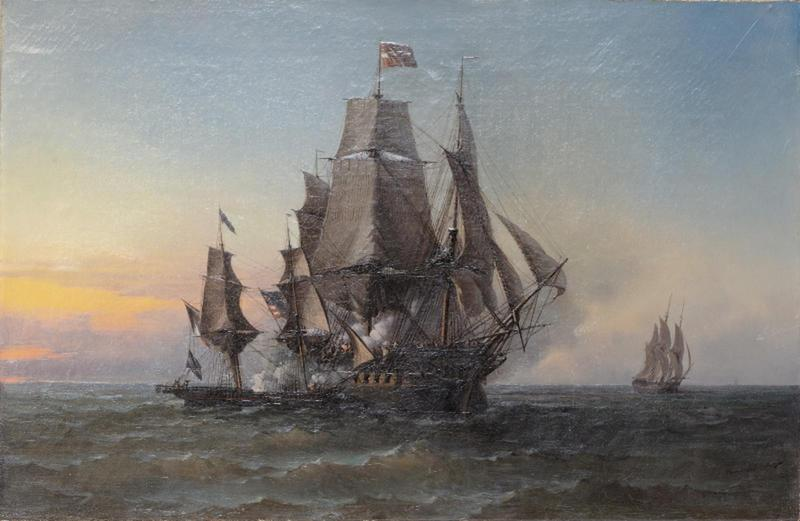
Boarding of Triton by the French corsair Hasard under Robert Surcouf. Painting by Léon Trémisot.

=== Cruise of Clarisse ===
First cruise with Clarisse and battle of Susoh.

In early 1798, after 14 months in Paris, Surcouf took command of Clarisse, a 14-gun privateer brig armed with four 12-pounders, ten 8-pounders, and manned by a 120-strong complement. He departed from Paimboeuf, Nantes, in February 1798, this time with a proper lettre de marque. During the journey to Isle de France, Clarisse chased a British slave ship, which escaped after one of her shots cut off Clarisse's foremast tops. Surcouf captured a British brig South of Cape of Good Hope, which surrendered after a warning shot was fired, on which he sent a prize crew under Captain Dujardin, and arrived La Réunion on 5 December.

In early 1799, Surcouf sailed to the city of Susoh in Aceh, on Sumatra, where he found two 20-gun merchantmen anchored in the harbour, in the process of loading pepper; Clarisse dropped anchor close by and opened fire, after which Surcouf sent his older brother Nicolas to head a 20-man board party on Clarisse's boats and board the largest of the ships, while he boarded her with Clarisse from the opposite side; assaulted from two sides, she surrendered after a 30-minute battle. The other ship cut her anchor and attempted to flee, but the boats of Clarisse overhauled and captured her without resistance, most of her crew being ashore. Surcouf returned to Île de France with his prizes in June.

Second cruise with Clarisse

On 16 August, Clarisse departed Isle de France for another cruise; she sailed to La Réunion carrying despatches of Malartic to the governor. She then cruised to Java to procure water, where she arrived on 27 September. On 1 October, Surcouf captured a Danish merchantman, which he sent away under Lieutenant Fonroc; on 4 November, the Portuguese merchantman Nostra Signora de la Conception carrying 116,000 piastres; on 6 November, a British ship laden with a salt; and on 11 November, the 20-gun Auspicious, with a cargo worth 1,032,580 francs.

Surcouf sailed to Mergui to purchase food and free his prisoners, and put to sail on 10 December. En route, he met the fellow French privateer Malartic, under Jean Dutertre; soon after, the privateers met a British frigate, 38-gun frigate HMS Sybille, which gave chase and which Surcouf managed to outsail by throwing eight guns overboard, along with various other implements.

On 1 January 1800, Clarisse captured a large rice-laden merchantman, the British James. On 3 January, she detected two American 16-carronade ships forming a line of battle; although Clarisse lacked the eight guns sacrificed to escape Sybille and 60 of her men detached on her various prizes, Surcouf engaged. Clarisse raked the rear-most ship, Louisa, and boarded her, while simultaneously firing a broadside on the other ship, Mercury, which attempted to rescue her mate. Nicolas Surcouf led a 30-man boarding party to seize Louisa, while Mercury escaped. Clarisse could not give chase, her bowsprit having been destroyed in the collision with Louisa. Nicolas Surcouf took a prize crew and sailed Louisa back to Port Louis.

Clarisse continued her patrol, capturing the ships Catherine, Haderbux, Anna Maria, Nostra Signora de la Cruz, Louis, Janna, Notre Dame de Bon Succès, and Albion, before sailing back to Isle de France with her prizes. She arrived in early February 1800.

Depictions of Clarisse
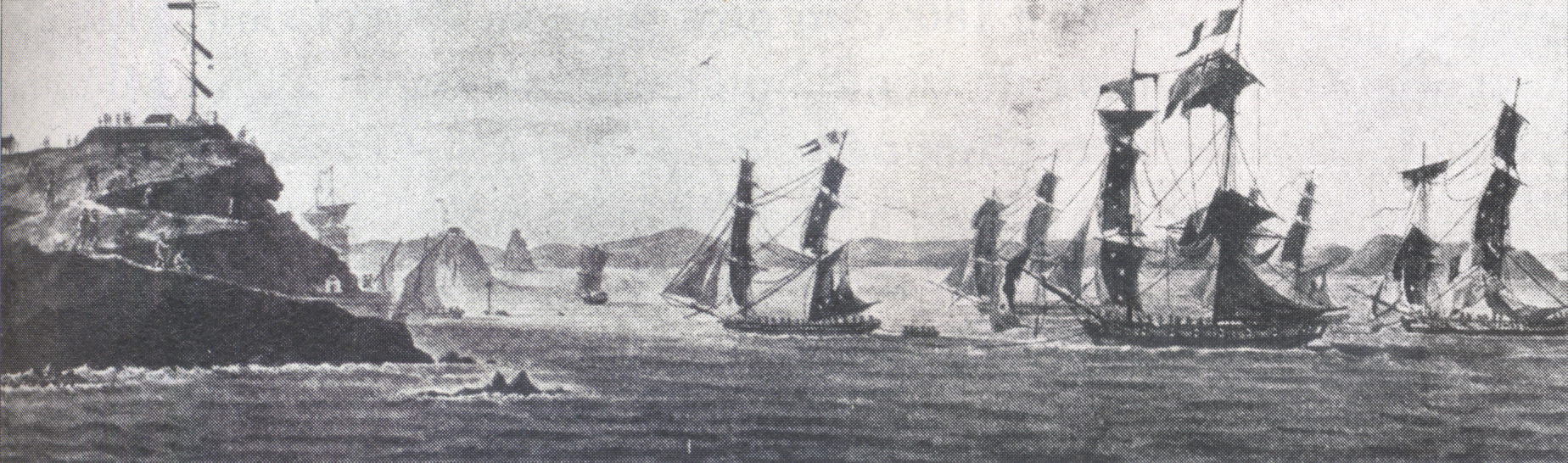
Surcouf returning to Port-Louis with his prizes (probably on Clarisse).

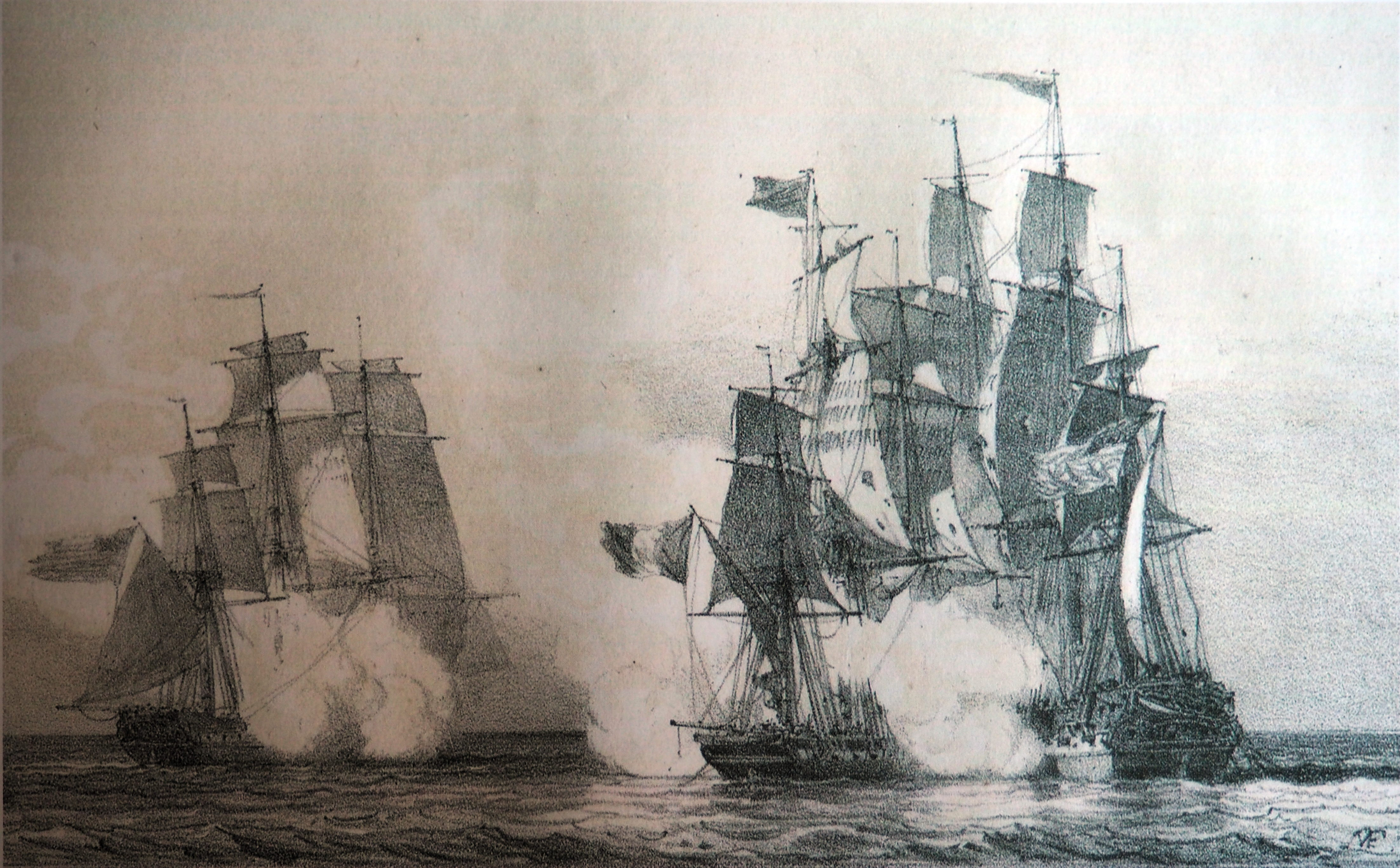
Drawing by Morel-Fatio depicting the battle between Clarisse and the American Louisa and Mercury (Morel-Fatio depicts Clarisse as a three-masted ship).

=== Cruise of Confiance and capture of Kent ===
Cruise of Confiance

In May 1800, Surcouf took command of Confiance, a fast 18-gun brig from Bordeaux, with a 150-man complement; the competition with Dutertre for the captainship of Confiance almost degenerated into a duel, and Governor Malartic had to intervene to prevent it, stating that such a confrontation would be "an English victory". The sailor and painter Ambroise Louis Garneray, future biographer of Surcouf, enlisted at this time.

In late April 1800, Confiance cruised off Sunda Strait, where she captured an American ship; she then left the strait to avoid the frigate USS Essex, which was known to cruise in these waters, and sailed to the Seychelles. There, he escaped a British ship of the line and a frigate, and sailed on to cruise the Bay of Bengal.

On 19 September, Confiance captured Prize, from Calcutta, which had stored eight of her ten guns in her hold to improve her stability. Prize was sent off to Mauritius on the next day with an 85-man prize crew. Surcouf then steered for Ganjam, where he captured three smaller ships.

On 7 October 1800, off Sand Heads, near Calcutta, Confiance met the 40-gun East Indiaman Kent, of 824 tons burthen, (Note: A number of French accounts of Surcouf's victory exaggerate Kent's size and guns by 60%. Rouvier states 38 guns and 1,200 tons; Cunat specifies that Kent carried twenty-six 18-pounder on her battery and twelve 9-pounder on her castles; Hennequin gives an approximate 40 guns, but confirms the figure of 1,200 tons.) under Captain Robert Rivington. Kent had rescued the crew of another ship, Queen, (Note: Cunat actually names her as Reine, translating her name into French.) destroyed by fire, and therefore had an exceptionally large complement of 437 men, including her passengers; 300 of them were soldiers and sailors; (Note: The Gazette de France reported that Kent carried 150 soldiers of line infantry.) Surcouf managed to board his larger opponent and, after over an hour and a half of battle across the decks of the ship, seize control of Kent.

The British had suffered fourteen killed, including the captain, and forty-four wounded, while the French suffered five killed and ten wounded. The privateers were then granted one hour of free pillaging on Kent before Surcouf restored order; however, the female passengers were strictly protected and sentries were placed in front of their apartments. Amongst the prisoners were General Frederick St. John and his wife, Arabella Craven.

Battle between Confiance and Kent
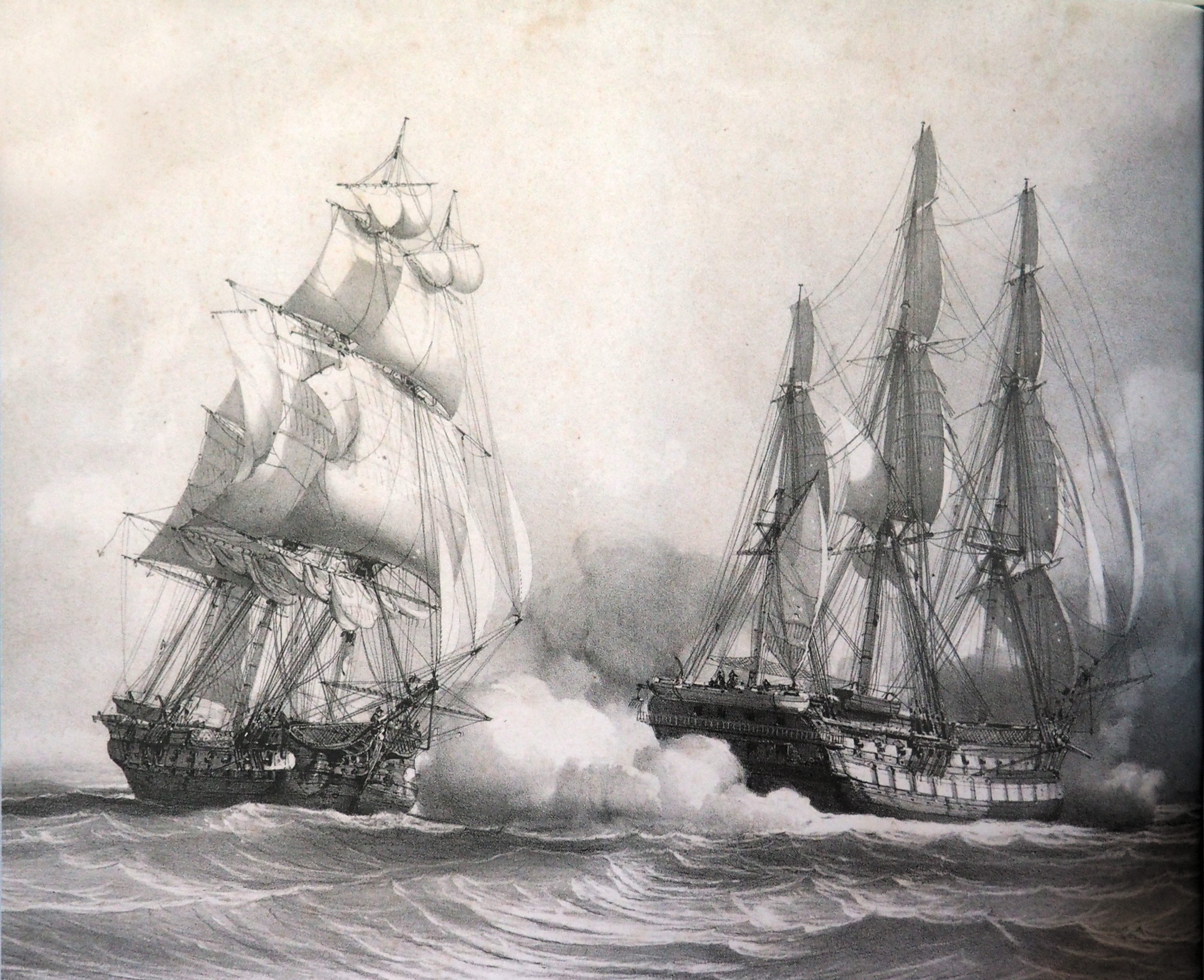
Confiance raking Kent, which just missed her maneuver, and preparing to come alongside. Engraving by Léon Morel-Fatio.

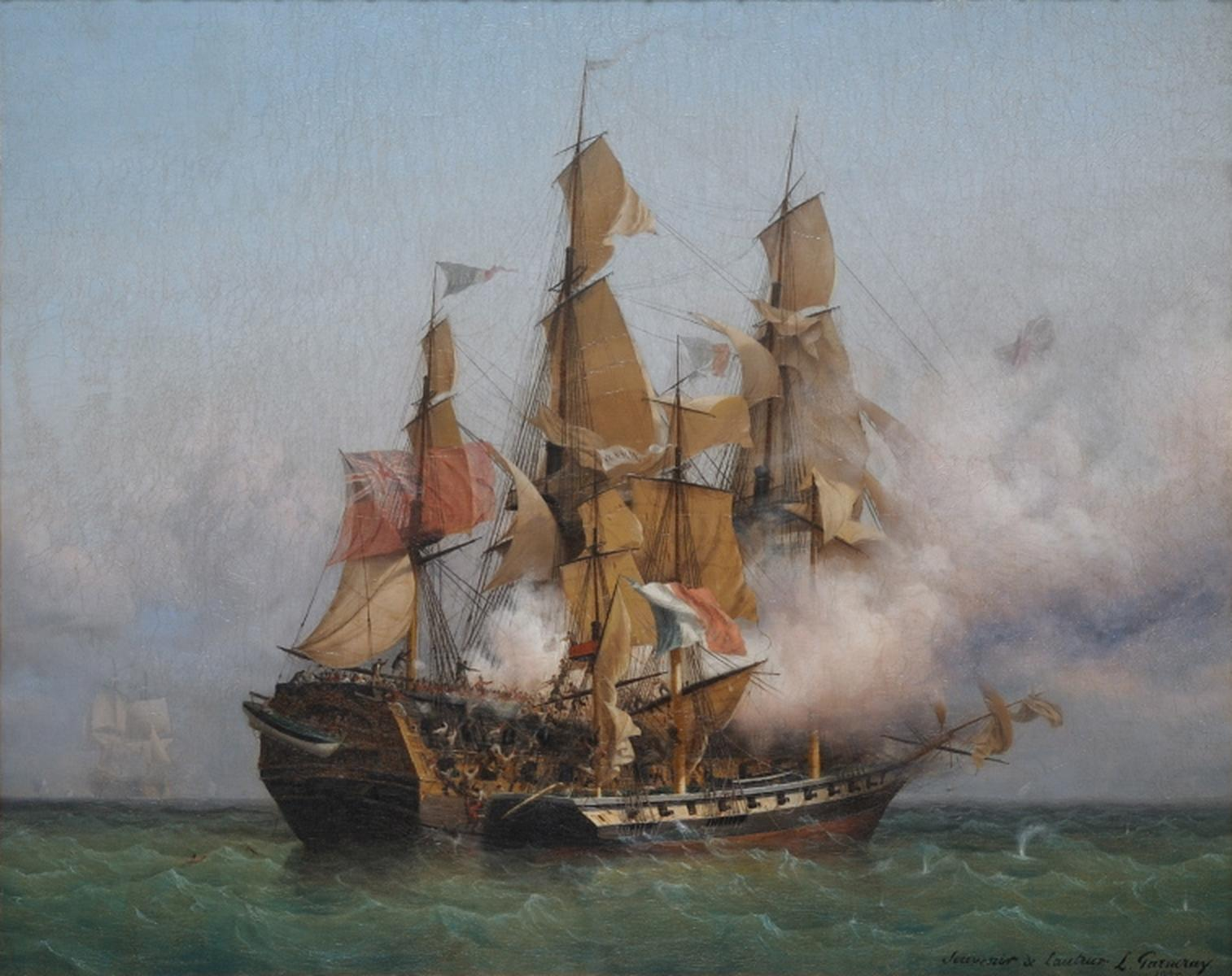
Capture of Kent by Confiance. Painting by Ambroise Louis Garneray.

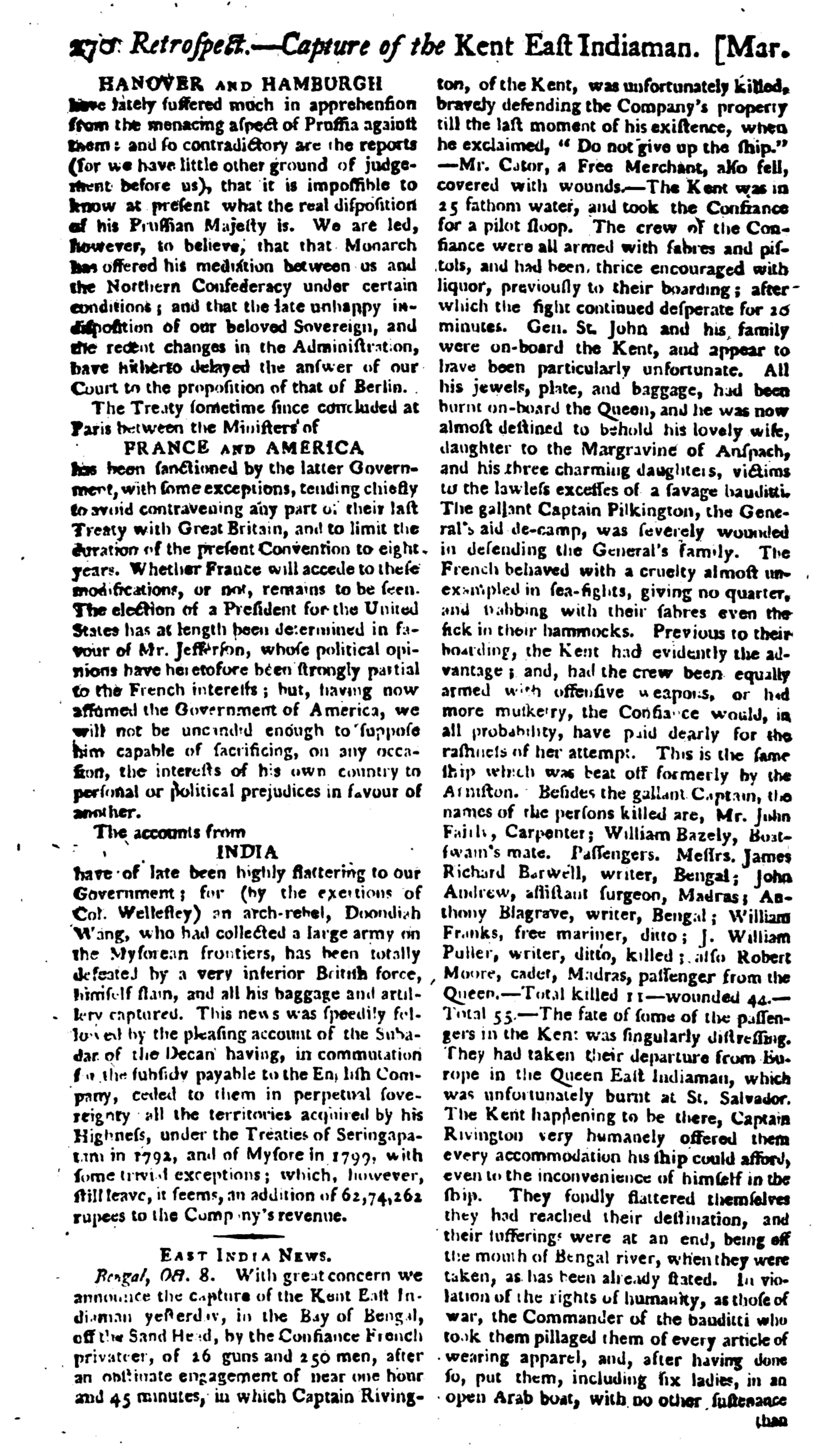
Account of the capture of Kent in The Gentleman's Magazine, October 1800.

The first officer of Confiance, Joachim Drieux, was sent on Kent with a 60-man prize crew, while her passengers were released on a merchantman that Surcouf stopped a few days later. Confiance and Kent arrived at the Rade des Pavillons in Port-Louis in November. The capture of Kent became a sensation, and the British Admiralty issued a reward for the capture of Surcouf.

After her return to Ile de France, Confiance was armed as a merchantman en aventurier (Note: Cunat says that Confiance was armed "à l'aventure", entailing that she was nominally a merchantman, but was capable of attacking targets of opportunity.) with an 89-man crew and loaded with colonial goods for her return to France. On the journey, Surcouf still managed to capture a number of ships, notably the Portuguese Ebre, with eighteen 12-pounder carronades and a 60-man crew; he released her against a ransom of 10,000 piastres and after exchanging her greatmast with that of Confiance.

Upon her return, Confiance ran into the British blockade and was chased by a frigate; Surcouf managed to evade her by throwing overboard all but one of her guns, his boats, anchors, chains and even components of his masts. He eventually arrived at La Rochelle (Note: Rouvier says Rochefort instead of La Rochelle.) on 13 April 1801.

In France, Navy Minister Truguet attempted to enrol Surcouf in the Navy as an auxiliary officer, which he declined. Hennequin states that Bonaparte himself offered him the rank of Captain and the command of two frigates, which Surcouf declined for fear of losing his freedom of action, and awarded him a Sabre of honour. Surcouf was awarded the Legion of Honour at the founding of the Order, on 19 May 1802.

Documents on Surcouf's Legion of Honour

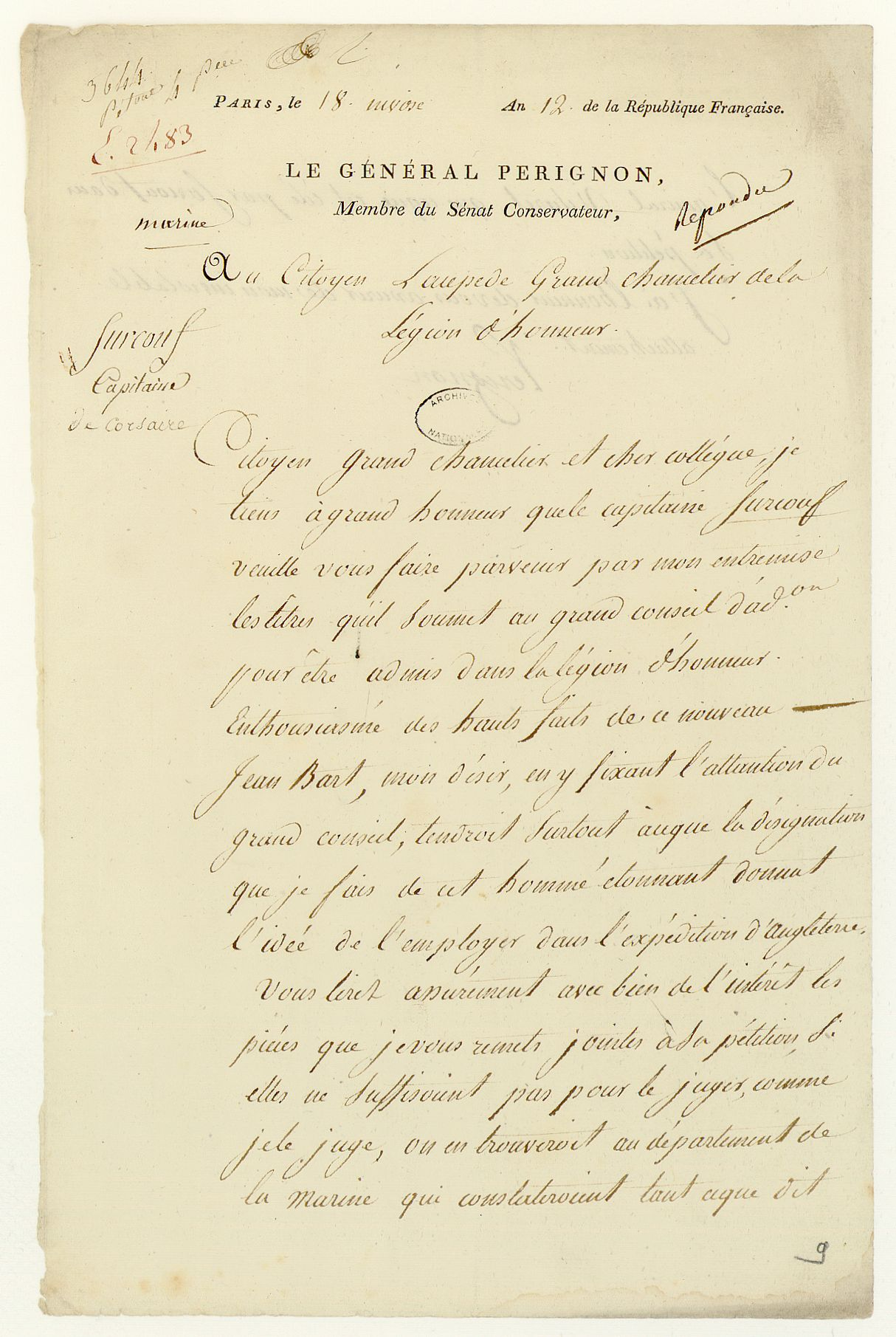
Document forwarding Surcouf's request to be admitted in the Legion of Honour

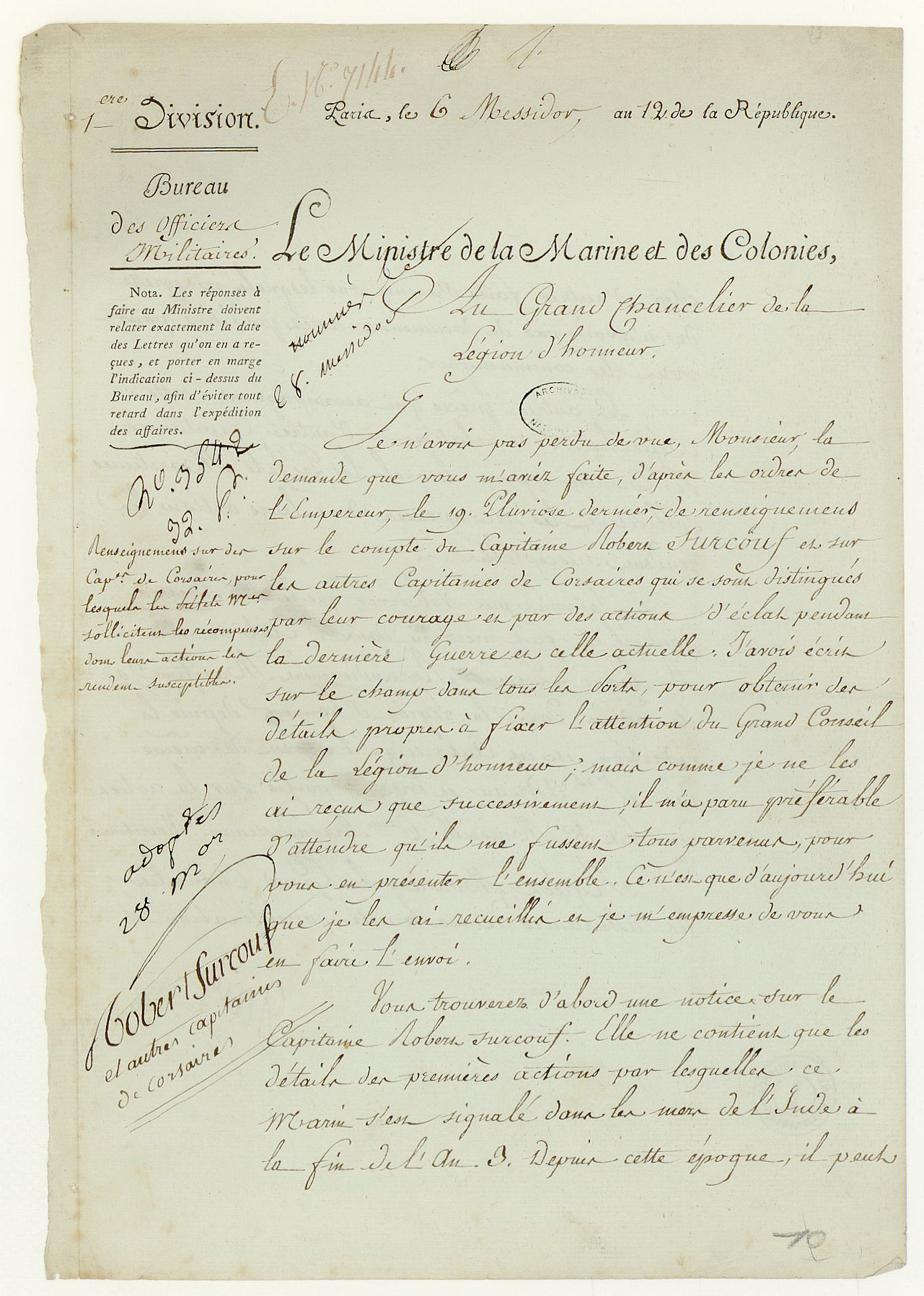
Document on the background verification process

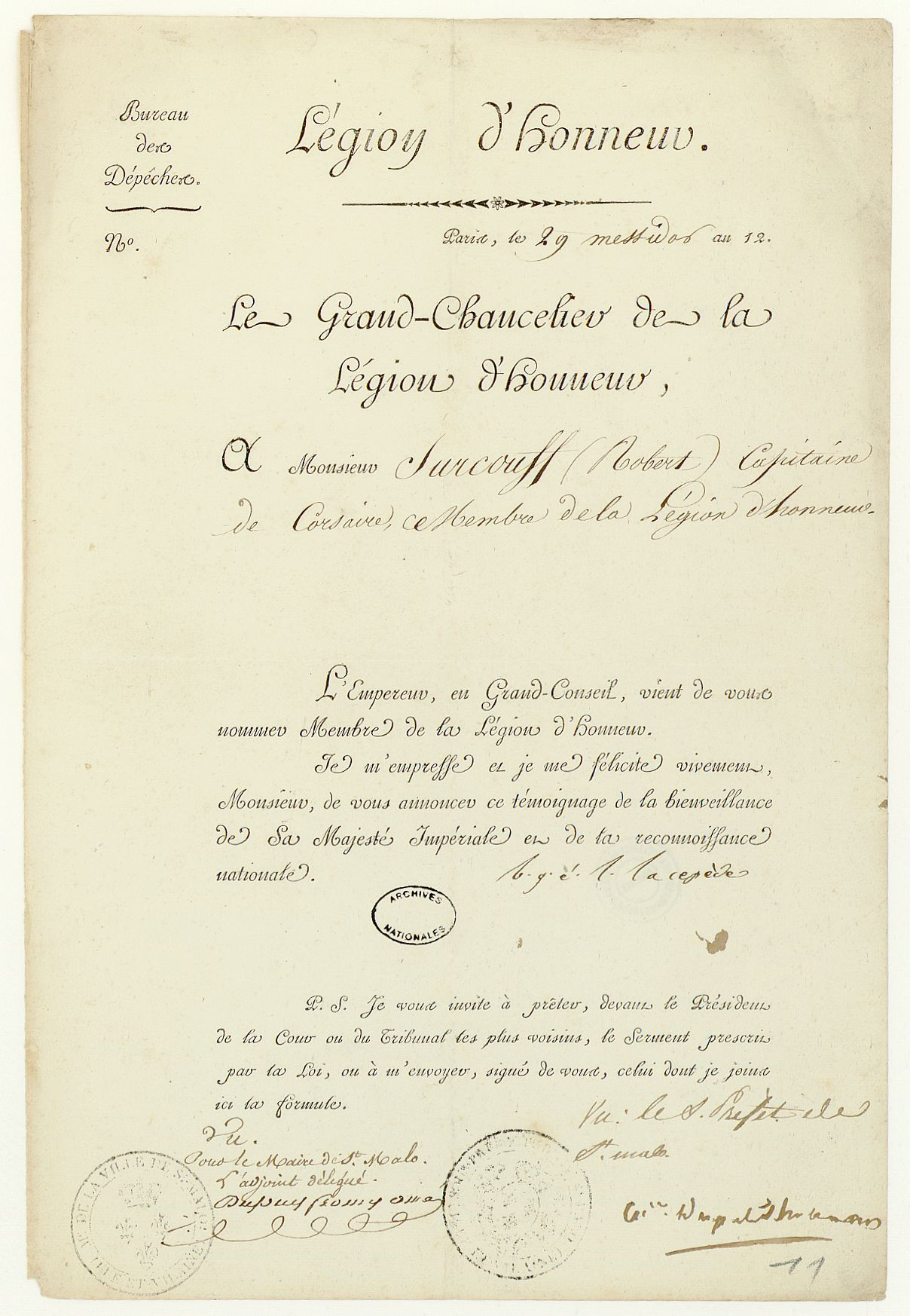
Official letter to Surcouf: "The Emperor, during a Great Council, has made you a member of the Legion of Honour"

On 28 May, in Saint-Malo, he married Marie Blaize, who had been his fiancée for two years; over the course of their marriage, they had five children together. Around 1805, Surcouf started to arm privateers in Saint-Malo in partnership with his father-in-law Louis Blaize de Maisonneuve, notably Caroline which captured four ships in the Indian Ocean under Nicolas Surcouf; Marsouin; and Confiance, which took two prizes under Joseph Potier.

=== Cruise of Revenant ===
Cruise of Revenant.

After a five-year retirement, in early 1807, Surcouf ordered the 18-gun Revenant, a privateer which he had built on his own specifications. On 2 March, he departed Saint-Malo with a 192-man crew to cruise off Bengal. On 9 March 1807, while en route, off Madeira, Revenant captured the British slave ship Aun, of sixteen 12-pounders, recently departed from Liverpool, which Surcouf let go for a ransom, after throwing her guns overboard, wetting her gunpowder and destroying some of her sails.

Surcouf arrived at Île de France in June, slipping past the British blockade and capturing several ships on the journey. During the subsequent campaign, which was to be his last, Surcouf captured 16 British merchantmen, partly because they tended to strike their colours as soon as they realised their opponent was Surcouf.

The arrival of Surcouf at Isle de France did not go unnoticed: the authorities and the population reacted with enthusiasm, while British insurance companies on Calcutta doubled the reward for his capture, which amounted to one lakh of rupees, or 250,000 francs. On 3 September 1807, Revenant departed to cruise off Bengal. On 25 September, she captured the British 12-gun Trafalgar carrying 10,000 bags of rice, and the 14-gun Mangles, carrying 11,000; on the 27th, the 12-gun Admiral Applin, with 9,500 bags of rice; on 1 October, the 1-gun Suzannah, with 5,500 bags of rice; on the 19th, the wood-laden Success, which was burnt; on the 30th, the 12-gun Fortune, which carried no cargo and was sunk; on 15 November, the Indian Macauly; on 18 December, the British 10-gun Sir William Burroughs; on the 30th, the Portuguese Oriente; and on 6 January 1808, the Arab Jem lab Dim. Surcouf sent these with prize crews to Isle de France, and then returned himself on 31 January 1808.

When a British captive officer taunted Surcouf with the words "You French fight for money while we fight for honour", Surcouf replied "Each of us fights for what he lacks most".

Surcouf then gave command of Revenant to his first officer, Joseph Potier. After a short cruise, Potier returned with a 34-gun (Note: Cunat gives a figure of 64 guns for Conceçáo and implies she was a naval ship; while she had indeed been built as a 64-gun ship of the line and still belonged to the government, she sailed for private ship-owners and was armed with 36 guns, of which only 28 were usable (report of Captain Potier, quoted in Lepelley pp. 143–144).) prize of the Portuguese East India Company, Conceçáo de Santo Antonio, captured after a one-hour fight.

On 4 July 1808, General Charles Decaen, governor of Isle de France, requisitioned Revenant. She was renamed Iéna, and commissioned under Lieutenant Morice, with Lieutenant de vaisseau Albin Roussin as second officer. Surcouf had an altercation with Decaen but had to renounce his ship. He eventually purchased Sémillante, which he renamed Charles. Returning with this vessel to Saint-Malo, he arrived on 4 February 1809.

=== Later life ===
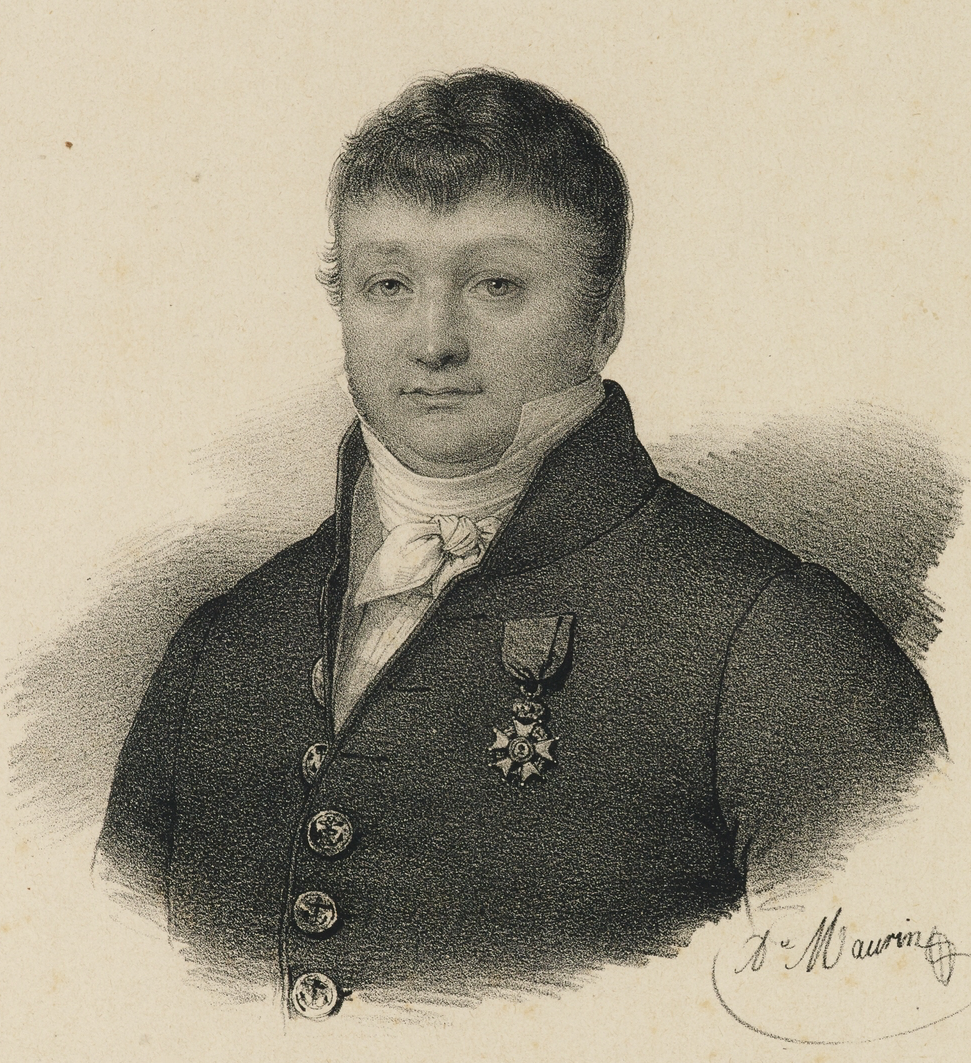
Portrait of Surcouf by Antoine Maurin

From 1809, Surcouf went into business as ship-owner, and over the years, he equipped a number of privateers: Auguste, under Pelletier; Dorade; Biscayenne; Édouard; Espadon; Ville-de-Caen; Adolphe and his last, Renard, under Leroux. The British captured all the privateers sent into the Channel, with the exception of Renard. Surcouf also built the brig Fantôme at Saint-Malo in 1809. Surcouf dispatched Fantôme to Isle de France in the Indian Ocean on her first voyage where the brig took three prizes but was captured by the British in 1810 and commissioned into British service as HMS Fantome.

In January 1814, Surcouf was made a colonel in the National Guard of Saint-Malo. During the Hundred Days, he served as a chief of Legion and maintained order. He resigned after the Battle of Waterloo and became a merchant, arming 19 merchantmen and establishing business with Newfoundland.

Between 1814 and 1827, Surcouf organised over 116 commercial expeditions. In 1815, Surcouf engaged in the slave trade, commissioning the ship Africain to transport enslaved Africans from Gabon. Africain conducted another slave trading journey in 1819. Four other expeditions are also suspected of having been slaving runs: that of Marie-Anne in 1819, Adolphe in 1820, and in 1821 Victor and Adolphe, under René Decaen and with Désiré Surcouf as first officer, which sailed under the pretence of sailing to Isle Bourbon (now Réunion), but actually to ferry slaves to Cuba and Philadelphia.

Surcouf died on 8 July 1827, and was buried in Saint-Malo graveyard with military honours. His tomb features a globe showing the Indian Ocean and an anchor, with the epitaph:

A famous sailor has finished his career

He is in the tomb forever asleep
Seamen are deprived of their father

The unfortunates have lost a friend (Note: Un célèbre marin a fini sa carrière Il est dans le tombeau à jamais endormi Les matelots sont privés de leur père Les malheureux ont perdu un ami)

== Legacy ==
Five ships of the French Navy were named for Surcouf, the first three being a steam aviso (sloop), an armoured cruiser, and a submarine cruiser, which at the time of her launch was the largest submarine in the world. The submarine joined the Free French Naval Forces during the Second World War and disappeared mysteriously after liberating Saint-Pierre and Miquelon. The fourth Surcouf was a large fleet escort destroyer, which was severely damaged in a collision with a Soviet ship, and the fifth is a modern stealth frigate, one of the first stealth combat ships.

=== Statue in tribute ===
Ships of the French Navy named Surcouf

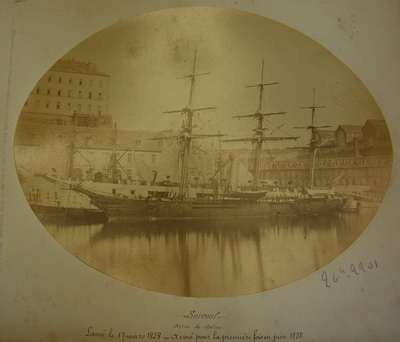
The aviso Surcouf

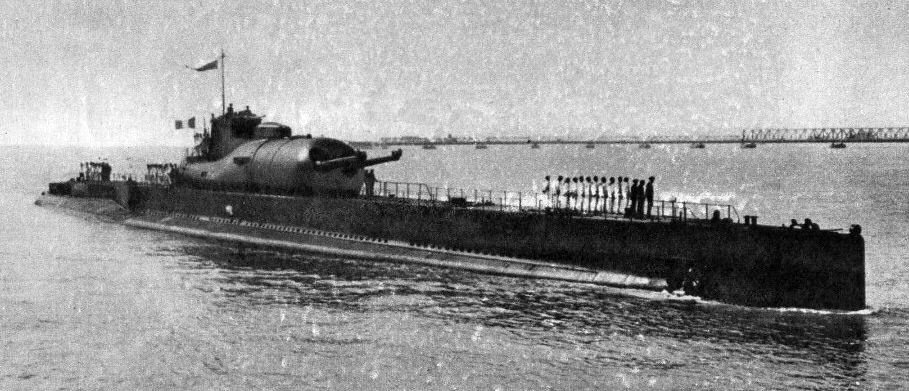
The submarine cruiser Surcouf

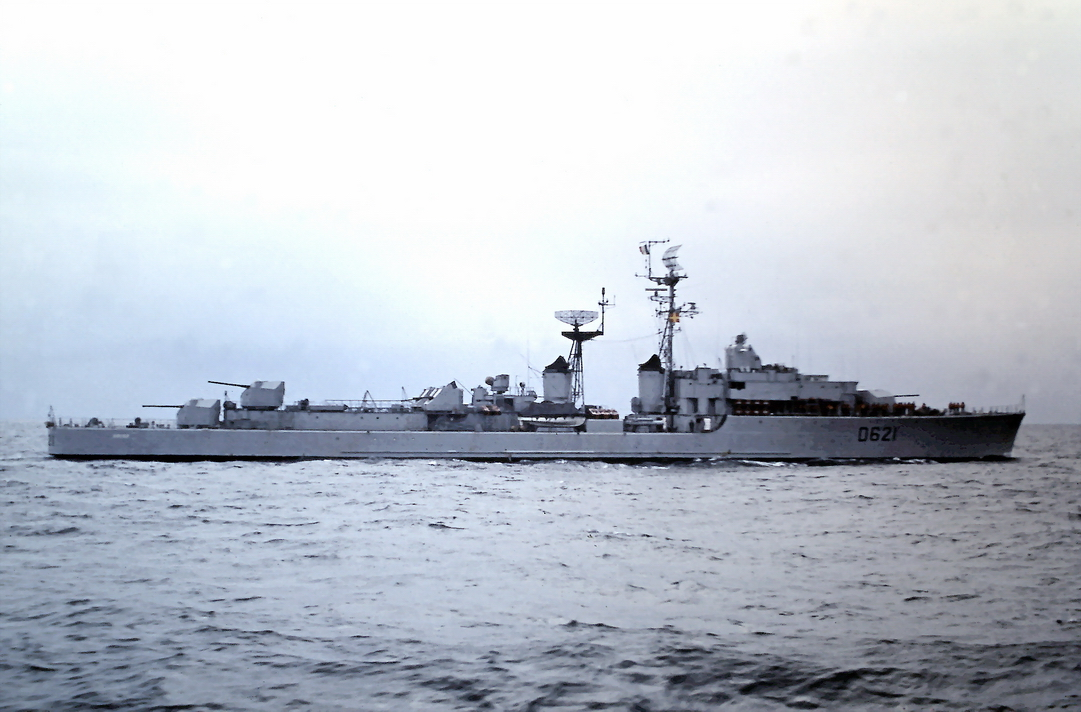
The fleet escort destroyer Surcouf

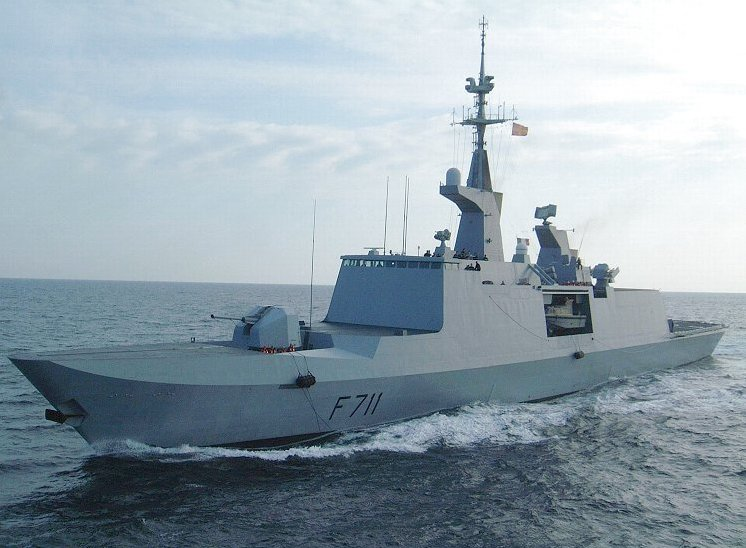
The stealth frigate Surcouf

A number of legends have grown around Surcouf, he is often stated to have been made a Baron of the Empire, which is untrue. (Note: Granier, for instance, states that Surcouf was made Baron.) Another legend states that Surcouf had thrown overboard gold seized on Kent but Kent did not carry gold. (Note: For instance the tale is told without reservation by Granier.)

There is a tale that in 1816, Surcouf challenged twelve Prussian officers to a duel and defeated all of them except for the last, which he let go "to tell in his country how a former soldier of Napoleon fights."; This tale is questioned. (Note: For instance the tale is told without reservation by Granier.)

== Bibliography ==
- Austen, Harold Chomley Mansfield (1935) Sea Fights and Corsairs of the Indian Ocean: Being the Naval History of Mauritius from 1715 to 1810. (Port Louis, Mauritius: R.W. Brooks).
- Biden, Christopher (1830). Naval Discipline; Subordination Contrasted With Insubordination. Or, A View Of The Necessity For Passing A Law Establishing An Efficient Naval. General Books Publishing. ISBN 0217730671. OCLC 558000880.
- Cunat, Charles (1857). Saint-Malo illustré par ses marins [Saint-Malo illustrated by her sailors] (in French). Imprimerie de F. Péalat. OCLC 793555867.
- Gallois, Napoléon (1847). Les Corsaires français sous la République et l'Empire [The French privateers during the Republic and Empire] (in French). Vol. 2. Julien, Lanier et compagnie. OCLC 6977453.
- Granier, Hubert (1998). Histoire des Marins français 1789–1815 [History of French sailors 1789–1815]. illustrations by Alain Coz. Marines éditions. ISBN 2909675416. OCLC 468167565.
- Hennequin, Joseph François Gabriel (1835). Biographie maritime ou notices historiques sur la vie et les campagnes des marins célèbres français et étrangers [Maritime Biography of historical notes on the lives and campaigns of famous French and foreign sailors] (in French). Vol. 1. Paris: Regnault éditeur. OCLC 457813464.
- Lepelley, Roger (2000). La Fin d'un empire : les derniers jours de l'Isle de France et de l'Isle Bonaparte : 1809–1810 [The End of an Empire: the last days of Isle de France and Isle Bonaparte : 1809–1810]. Economica. ISBN 2717841482. OCLC 45463166.
- Laughton, John Knox (1887). Studies in Naval History. Longmans, Green, and co. OCLC 4717238. Archived from the original on 10 August 2017.
- Levot, Prosper (1866). Les gloires maritimes de la France: notices biographiques sur les plus célèbres marins [The maritime Glories of France: biographical notes on the most famous sailors] (in French). Bertrand. OCLC 562314991.
- Nichols, John (1801). The Gentleman's Magazine. Vol. 89. E. Cave. OCLC 42741132.
- Norman, Charles Boswell (2004). The Corsairs of France. Kessinger Publishing. ISBN 1163357405. OCLC 1349067.
- Phipps, John (1840) A Collection of Papers Relative to Ship Building in India ...: Also a Register Comprehending All the Ships ... Built in India to the Present Time .... (Scott).
- Roche, Jean-Michel (2005). Dictionnaire des bâtiments de la flotte de guerre française de Colbert à nos jours [Dictionary of the ships of the French naval Fleet from Colbert to today]. Vol. 1. Group Retozel-Maury Millau. ISBN 978-2952591706. OCLC 165892922.
- Roman, Alain (2001). Saint-Malo au temps des négriers. Preface by Jean Delumeau. Karthala. ISBN 978-2845861404. OCLC 421820477.
- Roman, Alain (2007). Robert Surcouf et ses frères [Robert Surcouf and his brothers] (in French). Preface by Olivier Roellinger. Editions Cristel. ISBN 978-2844210500. OCLC 159954380.
- Roman, Alain (2018). Robert Surcouf, corsaire et armateur. Cristel éditions. ISBN 978-2844211491. OCLC 1041768621.
- Rouvier, Charles (1868). Histoire des marins français sous la République, de 1789 à 1803 [History of the French sailors during the Republic, from 1789 to 1803] (in French). Arthus Bertrand. OCLC 6804406.
- Asiatic Annual Register. Vol. 3. 1800. OCLC 723046516.
