= French cutter Renard (1812) =

French boat

Renard
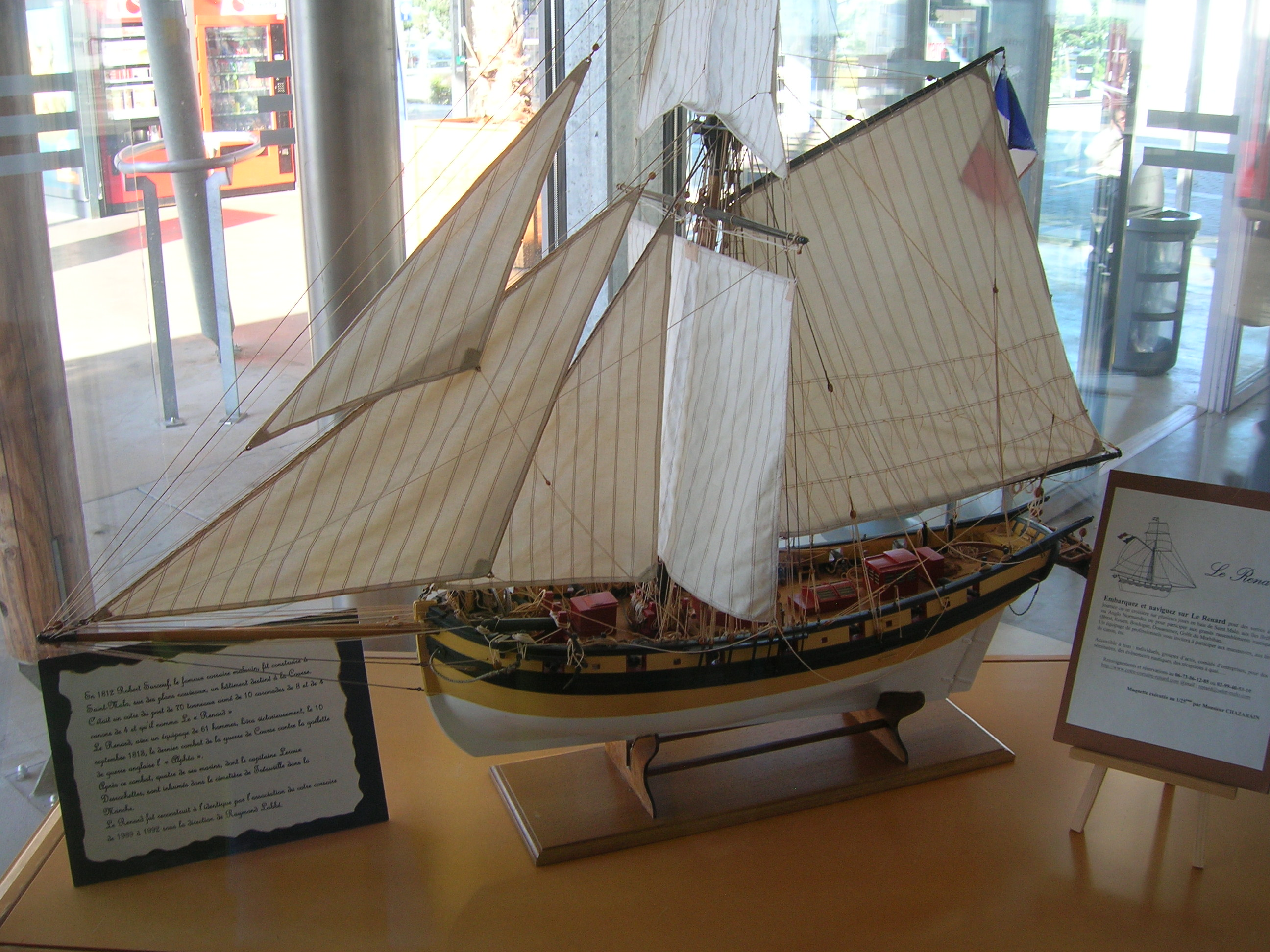
- Photo of a model of the French privateer cutter Renard on display at the SNCF train station at Saint Malo. The modeller was a M. Chazarain, and the model is built to a 1/25 scale.

History

France
- Launched: 1812

General characteristics
- Type: Cutter
- Displacement: 70 tons
- Complement: 60{from Saint-Malo illustrated by its sailors: preceded by a historical notice on this city, Charles Cunat 1857}
- Armament: 10 × 8-pounder carronades + 4 × 4-pounder guns

The Renard was a cutter launched in 1812 and armed and owned by Robert Surcouf. It was Surcouf’s eighth and last privateer ship.

Renard cruised under Captain Aimable Sauveur until 23 August 1813, when he required a replacement. Command then went to Emmanuel Leroux-Desrochettes.

On 9 September 1813, beginning at 5 p.m. and lasting through the night, Renard successfully engaged the British 10-gun schooner HMS Alphea, crewed by 35 sailors. Combat was intense and bloody until at 3:30 a.m. the following morning, when the Alphea took two direct hits from Renard to (presumably) the powder magazine and exploded. There were no reported survivors.

Renard lost five men killed and 31 wounded, including her captain, who had an arm shot away and later died of his injuries. Renard returned to France with only 13 able-bodied men. Alphea had carried a crew of 41 men.

== Replica ==
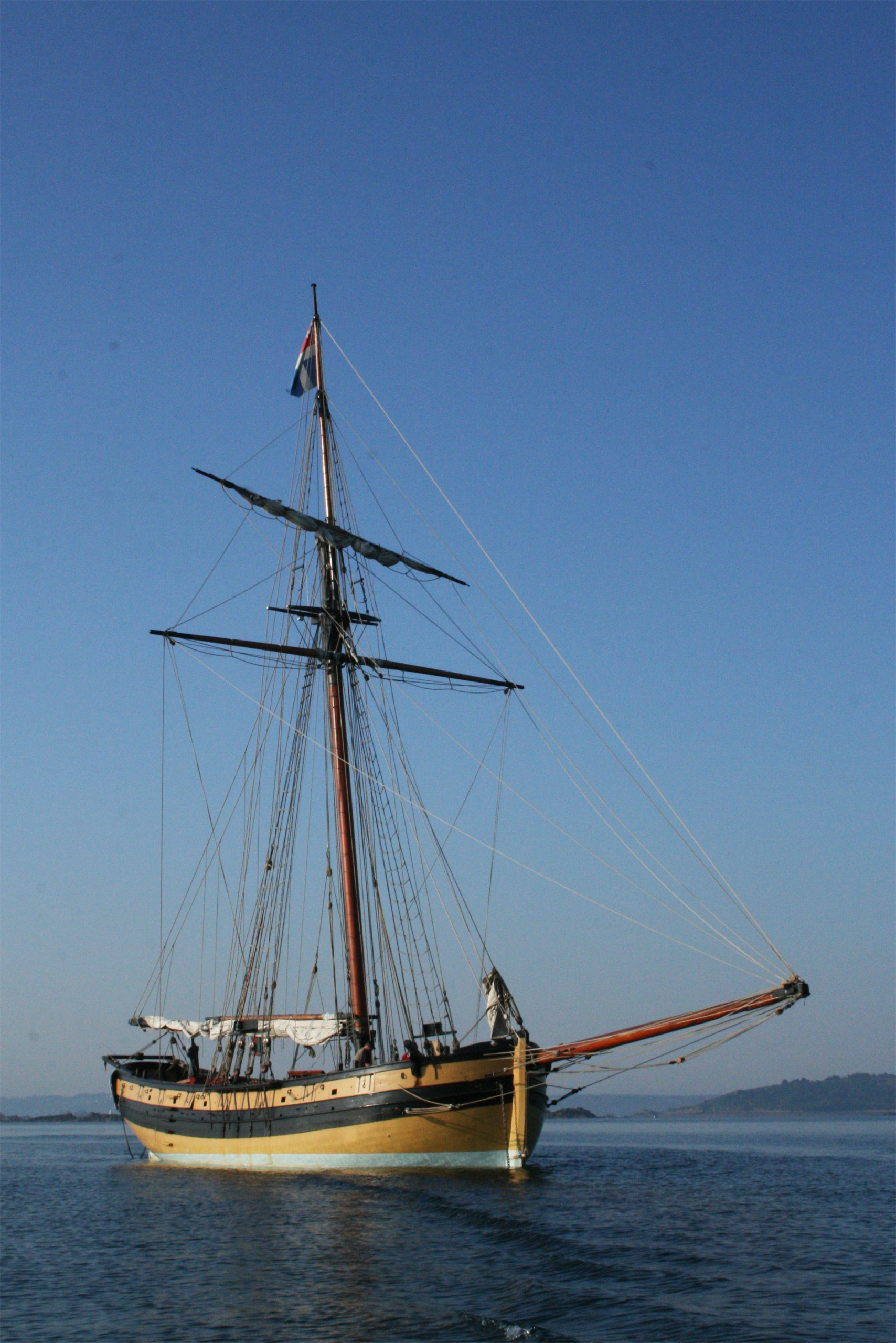
Modern replica of Renard

The Association du Cotre Corsaire Le Renard (loi de 1901) built a sailing replica of Renard in May 1991. One may rent the modern Renard for a day, for cruises, or for meetings.
