= HMS Victorious (1785) =

Royal Navy ship of the line

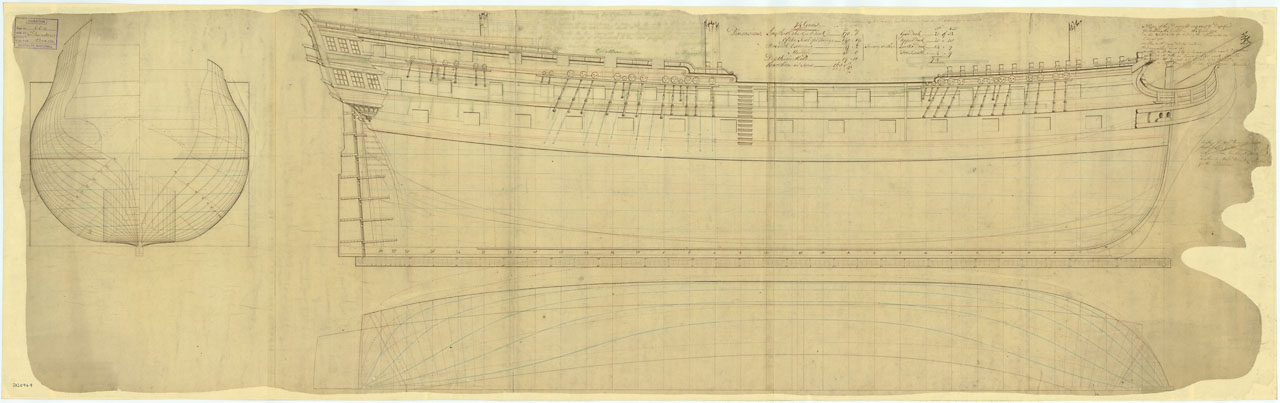
- Hull plan for HMS Victorious

History

Great Britain
- Name: HMS Victorious
- Ordered: 28 December 1781
- Builder: Perry, Blackwall Yard
- Laid down: November 1782
- Launched: 27 April 1785
- Fate: Broken up, 1803

General characteristics
- Class & type: Culloden-class ship of the line
- Tons burthen: 1682 59/94 (bm)
- Length: 170 ft 6 in (51.97 m) (gundeck); 139 ft 10 in (42.62 m) (keel)
- Beam: 47 ft 6 3/4 in (14.497 m)
- Depth of hold: 19 ft 11 1/2 in (6.083 m)
- Propulsion: Sails
- Sail plan: Full-rigged ship
- Armament: Gundeck: 28 × 32-pounder guns; Upper gundeck: 28 × 18-pounder guns; QD: 14 × 9-pounder guns; Fc: 4 × 9-pounder guns

HMS Victorious was a 74-gun third rate ship of the line of the Royal Navy, launched at Blackwall Yard, London on 27 April 1785. She was the first ship of the Royal Navy to bear the name.

== Career ==
In April 1795, Victorious ran aground on the Shipwash Sand, in the North Sea off the coast of Suffolk and was dismasted.

During the month of February 1796, Victorious encountered and captured the French privateer brig Hasard, formerly the British pilot ship Cartier, which was returning to Île de France (Mauritius) with a 10-man crew after having captured the East Indiaman Triton.

She took part in the action of 9 September 1796.

Victorious participated in the capture of the Dutch colony of Cape Town, in which an invasion had been caused due to fears of France's expansion across the world. Britain seized the strategic Cape Town and thus secured the nation its routes to the East. The rest of her career was spent in the warm climates of the East Indies, patrolling the vast waters in that region.

In 1801 Captain Pulteney Malcolm took command as Victorious served as flagship for Admiral Peter Rainier.

== Fate ==
On her homeward passage from the East Indies in 1803, Victorious proved exceedingly leaky. When she met with heavy weather in the North Atlantic, her crew had difficulty keeping her afloat till she reached the Tagus, where she was run ashore. Malcolm, with the officers and crew, returned to England in two vessels that he chartered at Lisbon. She was condemned and then broken up in August at Lisbon.

On 1 August Sir Andrew Mitchell arrived at Portsmouth, in company with Calpe, carrying Malcolm, his officers, and crew. Sir Andrew Mitchell, R. Gilmore, master, was a 14-year old, 522-ton (bm) ship on the Cork-Lisbon trade.
