= Cartier (1787 ship) =

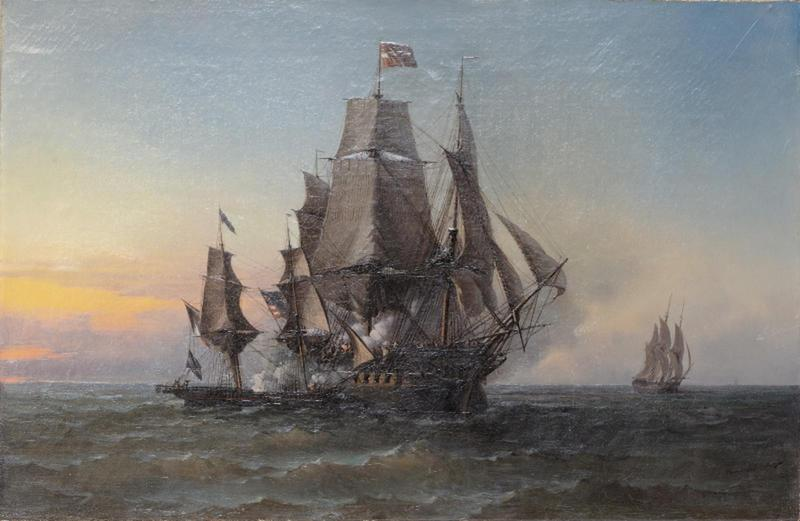
- Boarding of the Triton by the French corsair Hasard (ex-Cartier) under Robert Surcouf. Painting by Léon Trémisot.

History

United Kingdom
- Name: Cartier
- Namesake: John Cartier (Governor of Bengal — 1769-72)
- Operator: Bengal Pilot Service
- Builder: Bombay
- Launched: 1787

France
- Name: Hasard
- Acquired: January 1796 by capture
- Captured: February 1796

United Kingdom
- Name: Cartier
- Operator: Bengal Pilot Service
- Acquired: February 1796 by recapture
- Fate: Unknown

General characteristics
- Tons burthen: 150, or 170 (bm)
- Propulsion: Sail
- Sail plan: Brig
- Complement: 23
- Armament: 4 × 6-pounder guns

Cartier was a brig launched in 1787 for the Bengal Pilot Service as a pilot ship operating at Balasore Roads. The French privateer Robert Surcouf captured her, and then used her to capture the East Indiaman Triton on 29 January 1796. The British Royal Navy subsequently recaptured her.

== Career ==
The brig Cartier operated in Balasore roads, in the Indian Ocean. On 21 January 1796 the French privateer corvette Émilie, captained by Robert Surcouf, captured her. (Note: British records state 14 January.)

Surcouf had the four 6-pounder guns of Émilie mounted on Cartier, renamed her Hasard, (or Hazard), and transferred aboard with 23 men. Two days later, Hasard encountered the East Indiaman Triton, with a 150-man crew and 26 guns; despite the overwhelming superiority of Triton, after haranguing his men, Surcouf approached under a British flag, before hoisting French colours at the very last moment and launching a violent assault. In the ensuing 45-minute battle, Triton suffered 5 wounded and 10 killed, including her captain, Captain Burnycat (or Burnyeat), and the first officer, Picket; The prisoners were transferred to Diana, which Surcouf released against a 30,000 rupee ransom.

Transferring to his new prize, Surcouf left ten men on Hasard as a prize crew and returned to Île de France (now Mauritius), on Triton. During the journey back, in the month of February 1796, Hasard encountered the 74-gun HMS Victorious, which recaptured her.
