= French ship Surcouf =

Five ships of the French Navy have been named in honour of privateer and slave trader Robert Surcouf:

- French aviso Surcouf (1858), a sail and steam aviso
- French cruiser Surcouf (1889), a cruiser
- French submarine Surcouf (1929), a submarine cruiser
- French destroyer Surcouf (1953), a T 47-class destroyer
- French frigate Surcouf (1993), a La Fayette-class frigate
Ships of the French Navy named Surcouf
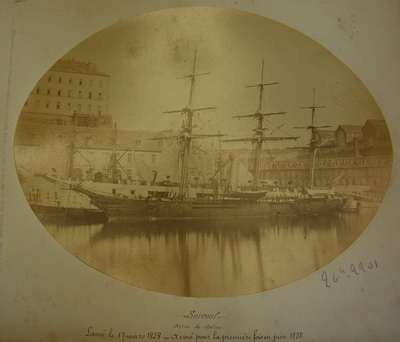
Surcouf (1858)

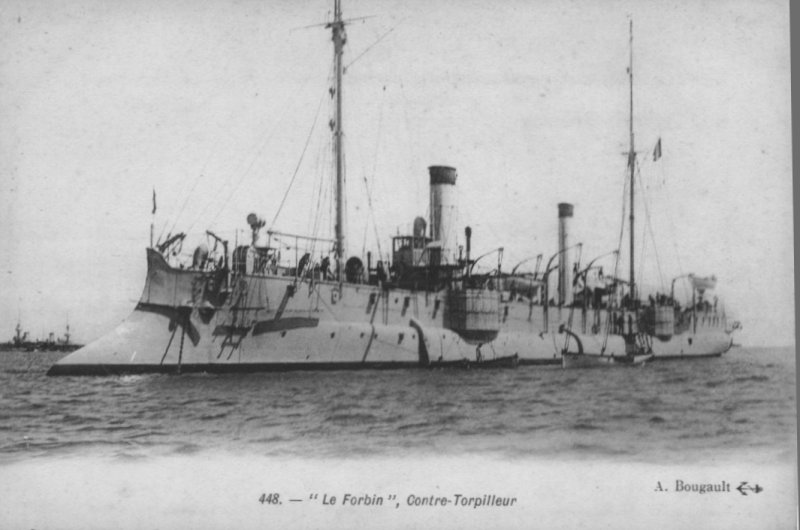
The protected cruiser Forbin, sister ship of Surcouf (1889–1921)

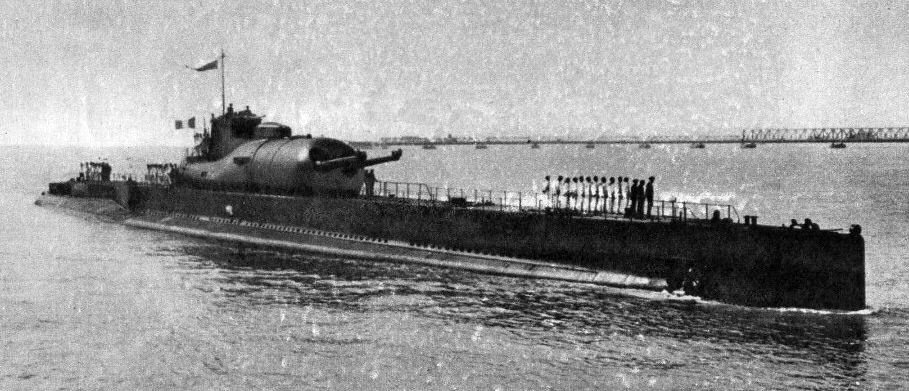
The submarine cruiser Surcouf (1929–1942)

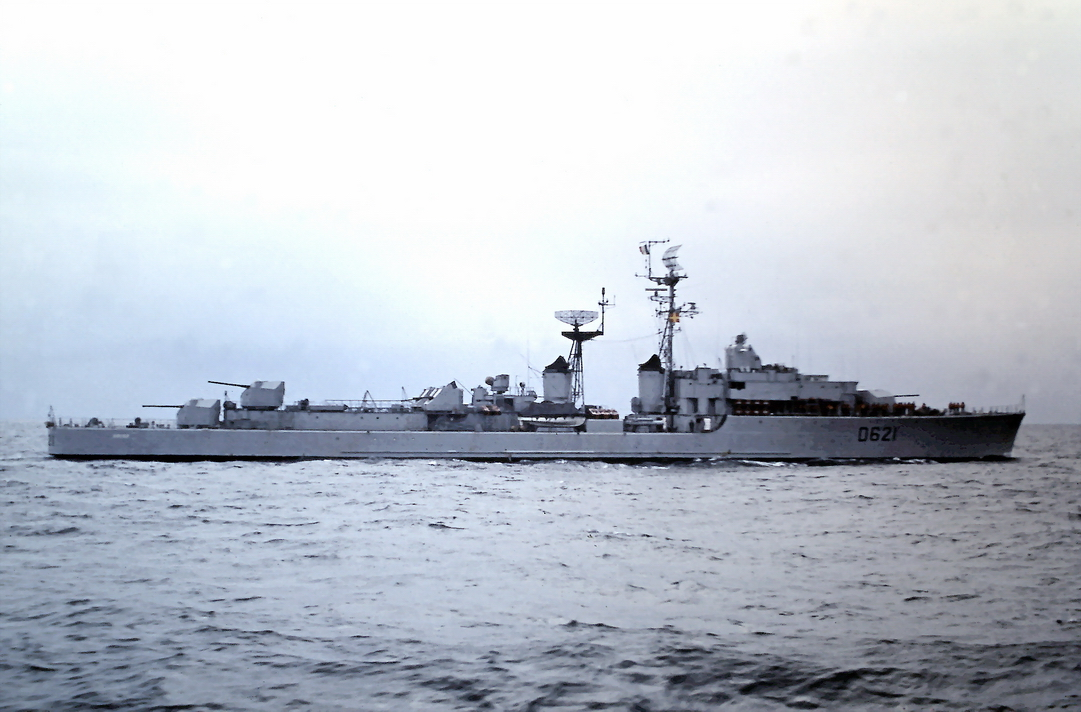
The fleet escort destroyer Surcouf (1953–1972)

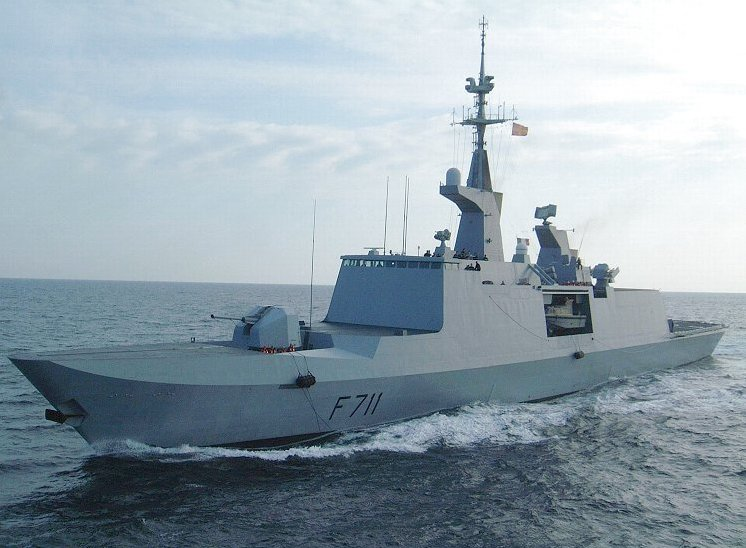
The stealth frigate Surcouf (1997–present)

== Bibliography ==
- Roche, Jean-Michel (2005). Dictionnaire des bâtiments de la flotte de guerre française de Colbert à nos jours. Vol. 1. Group Retozel-Maury Millau. ISBN 978-2-9525917-0-6. OCLC 165892922.
- Roche, Jean-Michel (2005). Dictionnaire des bâtiments de la flotte de guerre française de Colbert à nos jours. Vol. 2. Group Retozel-Maury Millau. ISBN 978-2-9525917-0-6. OCLC 165892922.
