= Triton (1787 EIC ship) =

British merchant ship 1787–1796

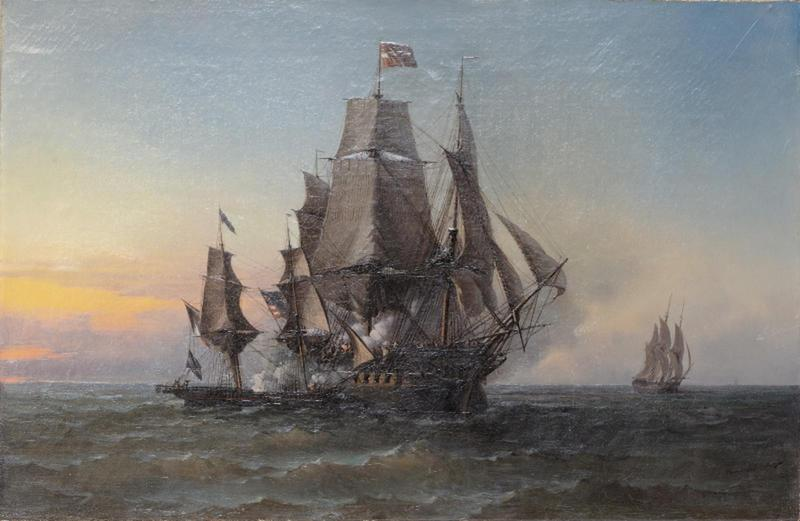
- Painting of the capture of Triton by Hasard

History

Great Britain
- Name: Triton
- Namesake: Triton
- Owner: EIC Voy. 1–3: Gilbert Slater; EIC Voy. 4: John Jackson
- Operator: British East India Company
- Builder: Randall, Rotherhithe
- Launched: 26 November 1787
- Fate: Captured 1796

United States
- Acquired: 1796 by purchase of a prize
- Fate: Sold c.1796

Great Britain
- Name: Triton
- Acquired: 1796–1797 by purchase
- Fate: Unknown post–1809

General characteristics
- Tons burthen: 800, or 80054/94, or 828 or 850, or 950 (bm)
- Length: 143 ft 7 in (43.8 m) (overall); 116 ft 0 in (35.4 m) (keel)
- Beam: 36 ft 0 1/2 in (11.0 m)
- Depth of hold: 14 ft 9 in (4.5 m)
- Propulsion: Sail
- Complement: 70
- Armament: 26 × 9 & 6-pounder guns

Triton was launched in 1787, as an East Indiaman for the British East India Company (EIC). She made three full voyages for the EIC before the French privateer Robert Surcouf captured her in 1796, while she was on her fourth voyage. She returned to British ownership shortly thereafter and the EIC chartered her for three more voyages to Britain. She was based at Calcutta and was last listed in 1809.

== Career ==
The EIC took Triton up as for six voyages a regular ship. She completed three and was captured on her fourth.

=== First voyage (1788–1789) ===
Under the command of Captain William Agnew, Triton sailed from The Downs on 5 April 1788, bound for Madras and Bengal. She reached Madras on 14 July, and arrived at Diamond Harbour on 23 July. She left Bengal on 30 December, reached St Helena on 7 March, before arriving at The Downs on 14 May.

Of her 118 passengers, not fewer than 98 had been soldiers in India. They had served out their contracts and were returning to England at the EIC's expense, together with their wives and children. Most of these men were now entitled to a lifetime pension from the EIC.

=== Second voyage (1790–1791) ===
Captain Agnew again left The Downs on 5 January 1790, this time bound for Madras and China. Triton reached Madras on 9 July, and arrived at Whampoa on 30 August. Homeward bound, she crossed the Second Bar on 2 February 1791, reached the Cape on 9 April and St Helena on 28 April, before arriving at The Downs on 28 June.

=== Third voyage (1793–1794) ===
Capt Philip Burnyeat sailed Triton from Torbay on 13 January 1793, bound for Madras, Bengal, and China. She reached Madras on 21 May, leaving on 6 July. Triton was at Pondicherry on 15 July, together with Warley, and Royal Charlotte, maintaining a blockade of the port, together with HMS Minerva. Triton had sailed from Fort Saint George (Madras) as escort to Admiral Lord Cornwallis, then Governor General of India, who was traveling to Pondicherry in a small captured French vessel. Triton also escorted him back, returning to Madras on 30 July. (Pondicherry fell to the Army on 23 August.) She reached Kedgeree on 8 August, and then on 8 September was at Madras again. She reached Penang on 4 October, and Malacca on 19 October, before arriving at Whampoa on 15 December. She crossed the Second Bar on 14 March 1794, reached St Helena on 18 June, left on 1 July, and arrived at The Downs on 17 September.

=== Fourth voyage and capture (1795–1796) ===
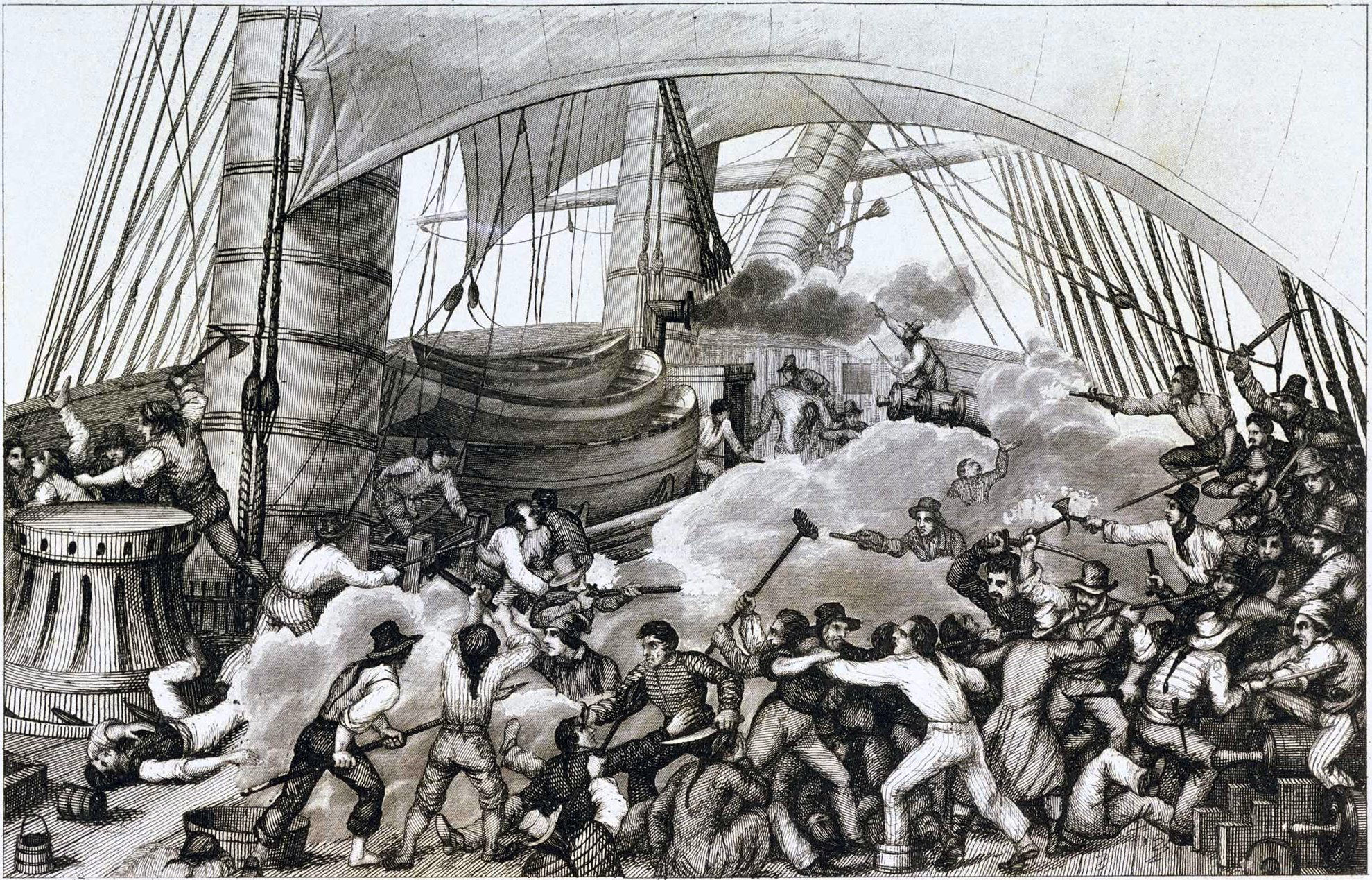
Engraving of the battle, by Ambroise Louis Garneray.

Captain Burnyeat left Portsmouth on 9 July 1795, bound for Madras and Bengal. Because she was travelling in wartime, Burnyeat had arranged for a letter of marque, as was customary for EIC ships, which was issued to him on 1 May 1795. This authorized him to engage in offensive action against the French, not just defensive. The French captured Triton at Balasore Roads on 29 January 1796.

The privateer Robert Surcouf had had a successful cruise in the Indian Ocean capturing several vessels, including the pilot boat Cartier, which he renamed Hasard. He transferred his remaining men from his ship Émilie to Hasard and on 28 January, sighting Triton at anchor, decided to attack. He recognised only too late the overwhelming superiority of his opponent. Surcouf, feeling unable to flee, decided to board her with his 26 men, (Note: Levot gives a figure of 17 men; Cunat, of 19.) After haranguing his men, he approached under a British flag, before hoisting French colours at the very last moment and launching a violent assault. In the ensuing 45-minute battle, Triton suffered 5 wounded and 10 killed, including Burnyeat and the first officer, Picket; Surcouf transferred his prisoners to Diana, another vessel that he had captured, and which he released to her captain against a 30,000 rupee ransom.

Newspaper accounts stated that a boatswain had persuaded 20 members of Triton's deck crew to decline to fight.

Surcouf returned to Île de France (Mauritius) with his prizes, arriving on 10 March 1796. However, Émilie had been sailing without a letter of marque, so although the Prize court declared the prizes legal, it seized them and sold them for the benefit of the State.

The EIC put the value of the cargo it had lost at £3,030.

She was reportedly purchased at Mauritius by an American and entered Calcutta under American colours a few months after her capture. Apparently the American sold her to Calcutta owners.

== Purchase and subsequent career ==
Triton returned quickly to British ownership as a country ship, i.e., sailing in the coastal trade. The EIC chartered her to serve as a transport, one of about 15, in a planned attack on Manila. The EIC chartered her from 25 May 1797 to 25 March 1798, at sicca rupees 10,000 pr month.

However, the British Government cancelled the invasion following a peace treaty with Spain and the EIC released the vessels it had engaged. Triton arrived at Madras on 24 June 1798. Later, the EIC chartered her as an extra ship for three voyages, for which records exist for the second and third:

=== First voyage (1798–1799) ===
Triton, under the command of Captain David Dunlop, arrived in England on 28 September 1799, from Madras.

Outfitting Triton for her return voyage cost £9,920 9s 2d, and was billed on 6 March 1800.

=== Second voyage (1800–1801) ===
Captain David Dunlop left Madras on 10 October 1800, bound for London. Triton reached St Helena on 12 December, and Spithead on 22 February 1801. She was at The Downs on 1 March, and London on 5 March. There she delivered a cargo of rice.

Outfitting Triton for her return voyage cost £7,474 9s 3d, and was billed on 15 July.

=== Third voyage (1802) ===
Captain Nicholas Anstis left Calcutta on 26 February 1802. Triton left Kedgeree on 17 April, and reached St Helena on 9 July. She arrived at The Downs on 13 September.

Outfitting Triton for her return voyage cost £1,926 9s 2d, and was billed on 1 November.

On 12 January 1803, Triton, Captain Anstiss, arrived at Bahia requiring repairs. The authorities put many administrative and pecuniary obstacles in his way and he was not able to effect his repairs and leave until 6 February. While Triton was at Bahia, the captain and crew of the whaler brig Anna Augusta arrived there; she had been wrecked a few days earlier south of Bahia.

Triton appears in the 1804 volume of the Register of Shipping with N. Ansties, master, Scott & Co., owners, and trade London–India. She is of 828 tons burthen, and is listed as having been built on the Thames. This entry continues unchanged through 1809.

An 1803 listing of country ships registered at Calcutta shows her master as N. Ansties and her owner as Fairlie, Gilmore and Co. An 1809 listing shows her master as — Patrick, and her managing owner as Robert Lawson.

== Fate ==
Triton's ultimate fate is currently unknown.
