= Robert Surcouf de Maisonneuve =

Robert Surcouf de Maisonneuve (4 January 1671 – c. 1720) was a Breton privateer.

== Career ==
Born in Saint-Malo, Surcouf de Maisonneuve captained the privateer Aimable under the reign of Louis XIV.

== Legacy ==
Amongst the descendants of Surcouf de Maisonneuve were Robert Surcouf and Joseph Potier.

== Notes and references ==
=== Bibliography ===
- Cunat, Charles (1857). Saint-Malo illustré par ses marins (in French). Imprimerie de F. Péalat.
