= En aventurier =

En aventurier (French, lit. "as an adventurer") is a French naval expression of the Age of Sail to designate a lone armed merchantman.

A well-sailing merchantman was said to be armed "en aventurier" in wartime when she travelled alone, without an escort, to return to her home harbour. These ships were loaded with goods, but also armed "en guerre", with a full artillery and complement.

The term was also sometimes applied to privateers.

== See also ==
- en flûte

== Notes and references ==
=== Sources ===
- Willaumez, Jean-Baptiste-Philibert (1825). Dictionnaire de marine (in French). Bachelier. p. 51.
