= Portuguese conquest of French Guiana =

1809 invasion of the Caribbean campaign of 1803–1810

- Part of the Caribbean campaign of 1803–1810
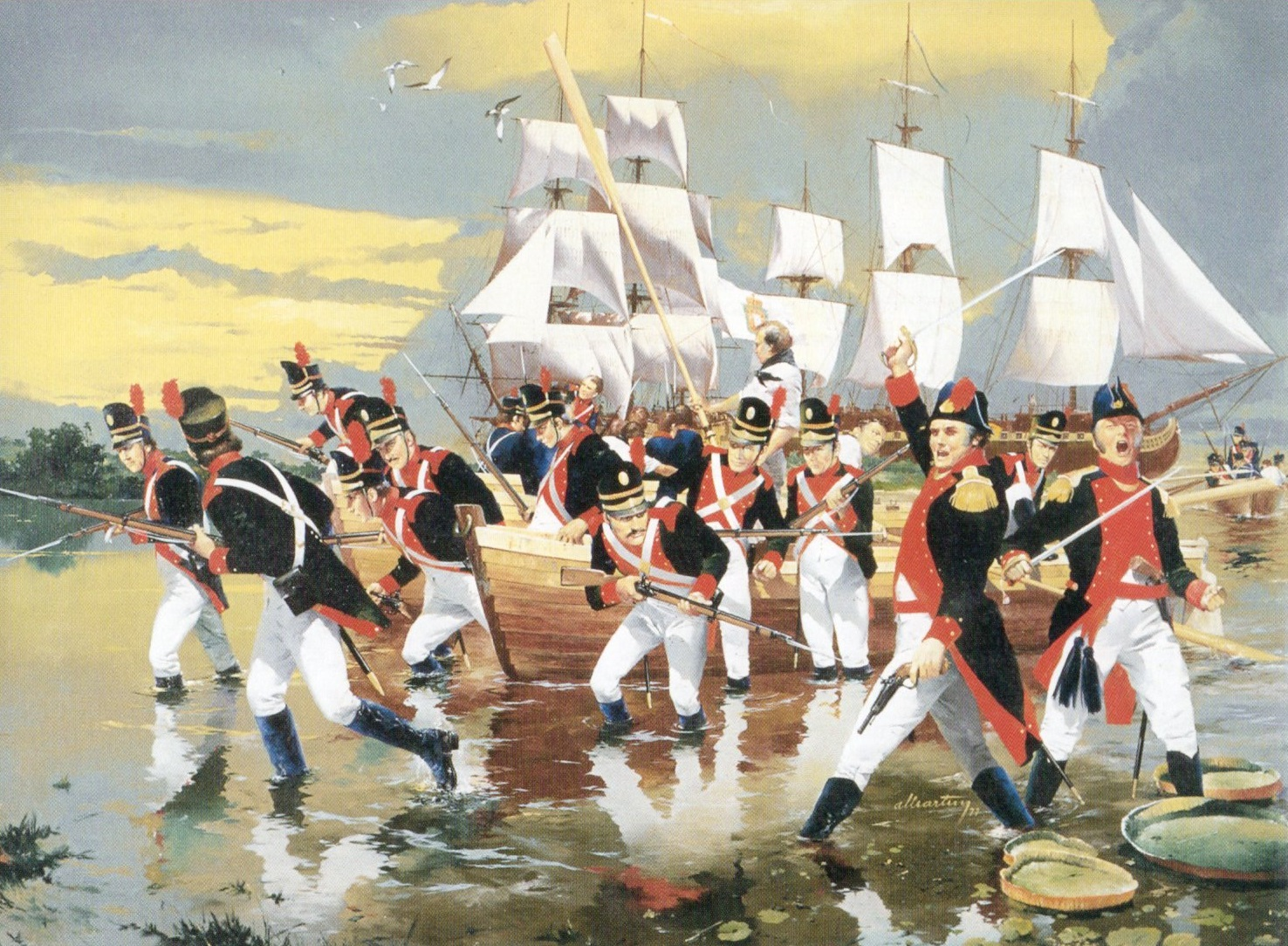
- 1977 painting of Portuguese marines landing in Cayenne during the invasion
Date	6–14 January 1809
Location	Cayenne, French Guiana
Result	Anglo-Portuguese victory
Territorial changes	Portuguese occupation of French Guiana

Belligerents
Portugal: State of Brazil; United Kingdom	France

Commanders and leaders
Manuel Marques; James Yeo	Victor Hugues (surrendered)

Strength
1,250; 1 sloop-of-war 3 brigs 1 cutter	1,290; 1 frigate

Casualties and losses
2 killed 30 wounded	16 killed 20 wounded 490 captured

The Portuguese conquest of French Guiana, also known as Conquest of Cayenne (Portuguese: Conquista de Caiena), was the capture of the French colony of Cayenne by Anglo-Portuguese forces in January 1809 during the Napoleonic Wars. It formed part of the Caribbean campaign of 1803–1810, a British-led campaign against the colonies of France and its allies during the conflict. As Britain was unable to send substantial forces to attack Cayenne due to military commitments elsewhere, the British requested the Portuguese government, which had fled from Portugal to Brazil in November 1807, to launch an attack on the colony.

Britain promised the Portuguese that they would control Cayenne for the duration of the conflict in exchange for carrying out the requested invasion. The Portuguese authorities in Brazil agreed and mustered an invasion force consisting of 700 regular soldiers and 550 marines of Royal Marine Brigade under Lieutenant-colonel Manuel Marques, which were to be transported by a four-ship squadron. The British were only able to contribute the Royal Navy sloop-of-war HMS Confiance under Captain James Lucas Yeo to the invasion force. However, because Yeo was an experienced officer, he commanded the entire force.

To counter the invasion, the French could muster only 400 French Imperial Army regulars, 600 unreliable white militiamen, and 200 Black irregulars. Weakened by years of British blockades, Cayenne's inhabitants were demoralised, and the defending troops proved unable to mount effective resistance when Portuguese troops landed on 6 January, despite the colony's extensive fortifications. By 14 January, the Portuguese had captured Cayenne and continued to occupy it until returning the colony to France in 1817. The Brazilian Marine Corps considers the invasion its baptism of fire because of the Royal Marine Brigade's participation.

== Background ==
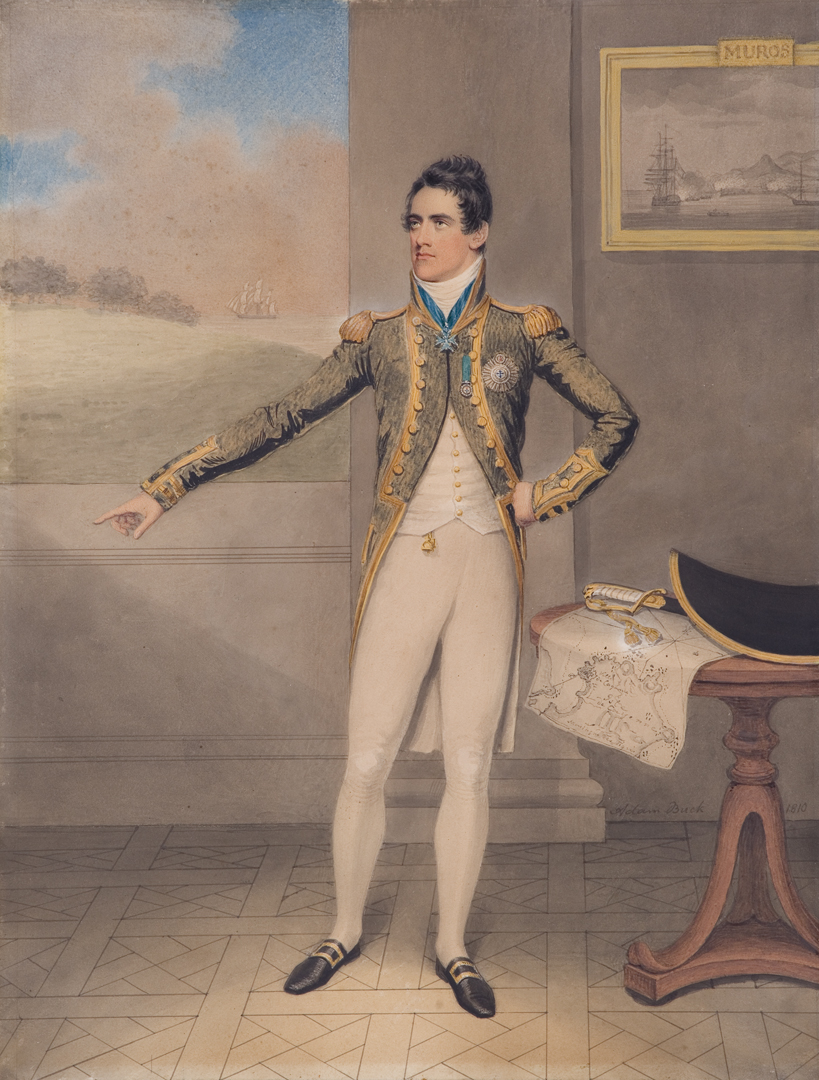
James Lucas Yeo, who commanded British forces during the invasion

During the Napoleonic Wars, French colonial territories in the Caribbean drained both the French and British navies. Fortified harbours on the islands and in coastal towns sheltered French warships and privateers that could strike British trade routes at will, forcing the Royal Navy to divert extensive resources to protect convoys. However, the maintenance and support of these bases was a significant task for the French Navy. It had suffered a series of defeats during the war that left it blockaded in its own harbours and unable to put to sea without attack from British squadrons waiting off the coast. Cut off from French trade and supplies, the Caribbean colonies began to suffer from food shortages and collapsing economies, and messages were sent to France in the summer of 1808 requesting urgent help.

Some of these messages were intercepted by British naval patrols. Based on the messages' descriptions of low morale and weak defences in the Caribbean territories, the British decided to eliminate the threat from the French colonies for the remainder of the war by seizing and occupying them in a series of amphibious operations. Command of this campaign was given to Rear-Admiral Sir Alexander Cochrane, who focused his initial efforts on Martinique, gathering a substantial force of ships and men at Barbados in preparation for the planned invasion. While the main British forces concentrated in the Leeward Islands, smaller expeditionary forces were sent to watch other French colonies, including the small ship HMS Confiance, deployed to the northern coast of South America under Captain James Lucas Yeo. Supplementing this meagre force were reinforcements provided by Rear-Admiral Sir Sidney Smith, the commander of the Brazil Station who had negotiated with the Portuguese government, then situated in colonial Brazil, where they had been forced to relocate in November 1807 following the Franco-Spanish invasion that began the Peninsular War.

Smith secured the assistance of a small Portuguese Navy squadron comprising two armed brigs, the 24-gun Voador and 18-gun Vingança, and two unarmed ships, the brig Infante Dom Pedro and cutter Leão. This force carried at least 700 regular soldiers and 550 marines of Royal Marine Brigade under Lieutenant-colonel Manuel de Elva. Yeo, who was to retain overall command of the operation, joined the Portuguese squadron off Belém in early December 1808. On 15 December, he attacked the coastal districts of Oyapok and Appruage, seizing both without resistance, in preparation for the advance on Cayenne, the capital of French Guiana.

== Invasion ==
The town of Cayenne is situated on an island in the mouth of the Cayenne and Mahury Rivers. In 1809, its approaches were protected by a series of forts and gun batteries, while the town itself was dominated by a modern star fort. Acknowledging that his force was not large enough to invade the island directly, Yeo decided instead to attack a series of outlying forts on the Mahury River in an effort to draw out the French defenders. On 6 January 1809, preparations were complete and Yeo launched an attack during the night, landing at Pointe Mahury at 03:00 on 7 January in five canoes despite heavy rains, which continued throughout the campaign. The surf was strong, and all five canoes were wrecked on the beach, but no one was killed. Yeo sent a Portuguese force under Major Joaquim Manuel Pinto against the Dégras de Cannes battery while he advanced on Fort Diamant with a British force of sailors and Royal Marines. Both positions were rapidly taken, with the British suffering seven men wounded while the French lost six men killed and four wounded. The attackers captured four cannons and 90 French soldiers, and garrisoned both fortifications with soldiers from the squadron.

After capturing the Mahury forts, the French in Cayenne risked being cut off from external help and besieged. In response, Governor Victor Hugues mustered most of the 600 troops available to him and marched on the Anglo-Portuguese positions. Consolidating his forces at Dégras de Cannes, Yeo demolished Fort Diamant and sent scouts downriver, where two further forts were discovered at Trio and the Canal de Torcy. The latter fort had been built to defend the approaches to Hugues' residence, which sat on the canal. Yeo immediately ordered Vingança and Leão into the river to attack the forts, with both ships bombarding them for an hour while Yeo prepared assault forces. Yeo himself led the attack on the Trio fort while a Portuguese landing party attacked the fort on the canal. Both positions were captured and their 50-strong garrisons driven off.

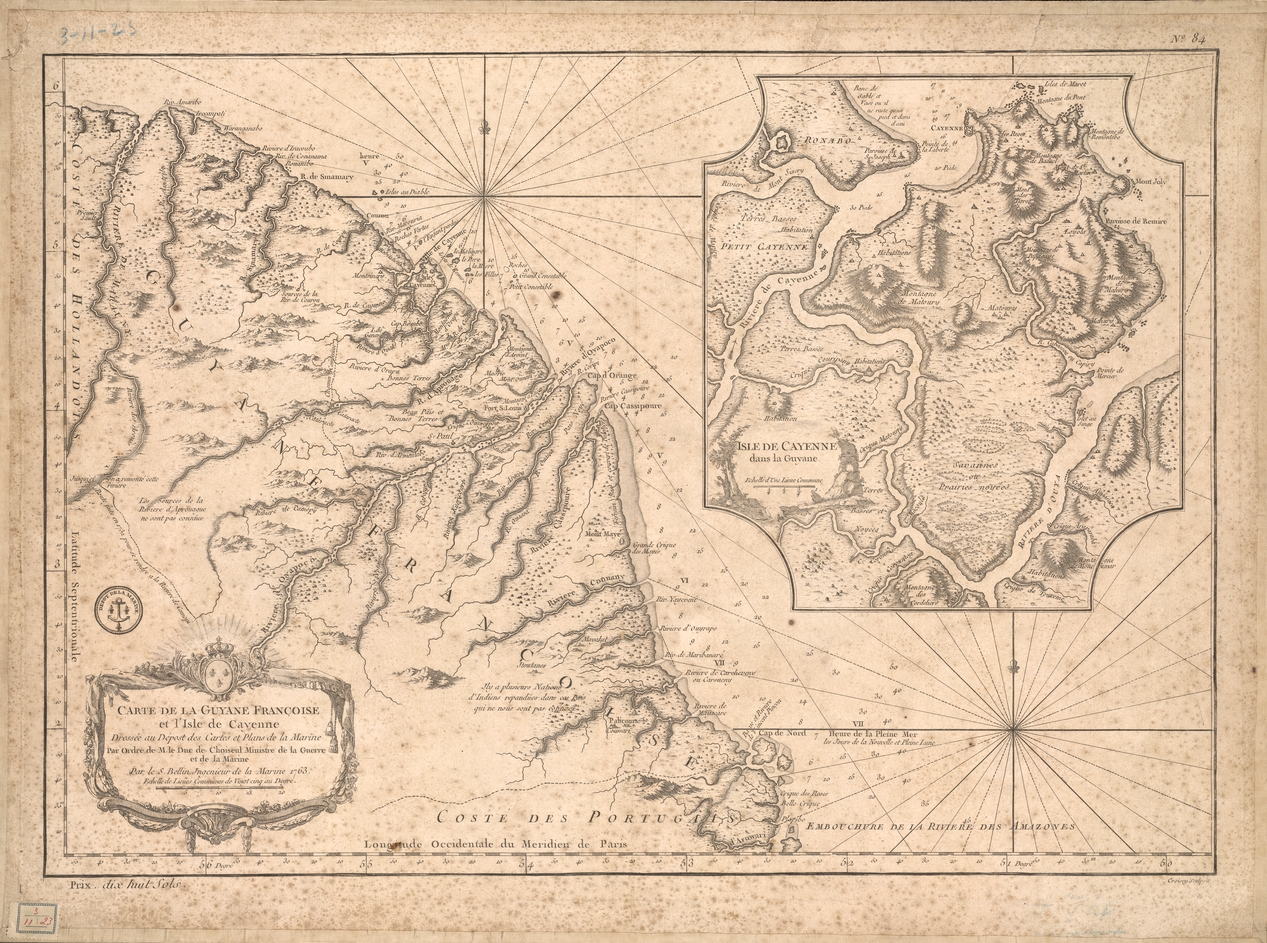
1763 map of Cayenne

As Yeo secured his position from attack from the river, Hugues arrived at Dégras de Cannes. Despite attacking Elva's garrison immediately, Hugues was unable to defeat the Portuguese before Yeo returned, and was forced to retreat after a three-hour engagement. A secondary force sent against Fort Diamant saw the British demolition party on the walls and, assuming the garrison there to be larger than expected, retreated without an assault. The following morning, as Hugues fell back on his residence, Yeo followed, using the river and canal to close with the position. Hugues had fortified his property with 100 men and two artillery pieces, and ordered his men to fire on a party of British sailors offering a truce. A second attempt was met with cannon fire, and although a third attempt via one of Hugues' slaves drew a response, the French general's overtures were only an attempt to stall the Allies while his men laid an ambush in the trees near their landing point.

At a signal from one of the artillery pieces, the French ambush party opened heavy fire on the troops advancing up the lane toward the house. Charging forward, Yeo led an attack on the ambushers at the head of his men and, in hand-to-hand fighting, seized the house and its artillery. Gathering his forces, Yeo then marched on Cayenne, expecting to meet Hugues at the Beauregard plain, where the French general had stationed his remaining 400 men. Reaching the position on 10 January, Yeo sent two junior officers into Cayenne offering an armistice, which was accepted, Hugues recognising that he was outnumbered and outmanoeuvred. Over the next four days, Yeo's men took the surrender of the outlying French garrisons and units, with the entrance to Cayenne planned for 14 January.

=== Topaze ===
To Yeo's consternation, dawn on 13 January showed a sail approaching from the north. This vessel was the 40-gun French Navy frigate Topaze, which was significantly stronger than any of the British or Portuguese ships in the invasion force (the large Infante Dom Pedro having returned to Brazil some time earlier). Topaze had been sent from France under Frigate-captain Pierre-Nicolas Lahalle to reinforce the Cayenne garrison in December 1808. In addition to extra troops and military supplies, Topaze's main cargo was 1,100 barrels of flour, as the colony suffered severe food shortages due to the British blockade. Lahalle was cautious on approaching Cayenne, and soon spotted Confiance at anchor off the harbour.

Confiance, as a 20-gun ship armed with short-range carronades, was significantly weaker than Topaze; more critically, she was also almost completely uncrewed, as Yeo had removed all but 25 men and two midshipmen for service with the expeditionary force on land. If Lahalle closed with the ship, the senior officer, Midshipman George Yeo, the captain's much younger brother, would have no option but to surrender, leaving the landing party cut off and at risk of total defeat. Reacting quickly, George Yeo mustered 20 local men, all free black civilians, and pressed them into service to complement his skeleton crew. He then sailed from the harbour aggressively, as if to confront Topaze. Lahalle was under instructions to avoid combat if it placed his cargo in jeopardy and assumed that such a small vessel would not approach his frigate unless heavier support was hidden nearby; unwilling to risk losing his ship, he turned and sailed north, rapidly outdistancing Confiance and disappearing over the horizon in the belief that the British had already captured Cayenne. Nine days later, as he neared Guadeloupe, Lahalle was spotted by a genuinely larger British squadron and defeated at the action of 22 January 1809.

=== French capitulation ===
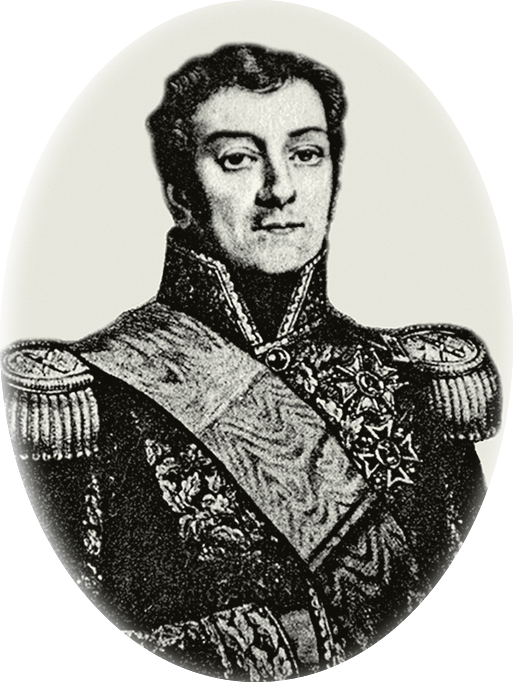
Victor Hugues, the governor of French Guiana during the invasion

With the French reinforcements driven off and their defences broken, a proposal for capitulation was made to Hugues on 10 January, which he accepted the next day when he met with Elva. The terms of capitulation included, among other things, the departure, aboard ships arranged by the invaders, of the French troops and staff with honours of war, the passage to mainland France aboard the same ships to other French individuals desiring to do so, and the preservation of the recently implemented Napoleonic civil code in the colony by the new Portuguese administration. On 20 April 1809, the warship Infante Dom Pedro, commanded by the Brazilian captain Luiz da Cunha Moreira, arrived in the port of Morlaix with Hugues and his staff.

Entering Cayenne on 14 January, Yeo's Anglo-Portuguese force took Hugues' 400 regular soldiers into captivity and collected the arms of 600 white militia and 200 black irregulars, all of whom were allowed to return to their homes. Included in the surrender were 200 cannon, all military and government stores, and all of the various villages and trading posts of French Guiana, which stretched from the Brazilian border to the Maroni River, which marked the border with the British-held Dutch territory of Surinam.

Casualties in the operation were light: the British suffered a lieutenant killed and 23 men wounded, the Portuguese one man killed and eight wounded, and the French 16 killed and 20 wounded. The French prisoners were embarked on the expeditionary force's ships and taken to Brazil, and the colony was handed over to the Portuguese government for administration, with the stipulation that it be returned to France at the end of the war.

=== La Gabriele ===
There was, in the region of Cayenne, a famous agricultural complex maintained by the French crown, formed by the Habitation Royale des Épiceries, better known as La Gabriele, by the Habitation de Mont-Baduel, by the Habitation Tilsit and by the Wood Factory of Nancibo, which were the main ones examples of colonial establishments in Guyana, in extent, productivity and number of slaves.

Possession of La Gabriele became one of the greatest benefits the Portuguese gained from annexing such a troubled colony. In addition to being one of the colony's main sources of income, it brought together all the plant species coveted by the Portuguese. [10] In April 1809, Rodrigo de Sousa Coutinho, responsible for the Brazilian vegetable gardens, sent the governor of the captaincy of Grão-Pará to provide transportation, from Cayenne to Belém and to other domains, "of the greatest possible amount of all spice trees". They should also bring "skilled gardeners", as long as they are not "contaminated with liberal ideology". In the same month, a new order determined the transfer of plants from the Pará garden to Rio de Janeiro, remembering that the search for "all kinds of cultures" was the "most essential point for Brazil" at that time. The French administrator of La Gabriele, Joseph Martin, signed the list of plants and planting instructions; in total, 82 species were shipped in six boxes.

During the Portuguese occupation, various spices and fruits were sent to Brazil, such as nutmeg, cloves, and breadfruit, in addition to walnut, camboeira, avocado, and cayenne seedlings, which were superior to sugar cane then grown in Brazil. [6] This collection would be one of the precursors to the creation of the Rio de Janeiro Botanical Garden.

== Aftermath ==
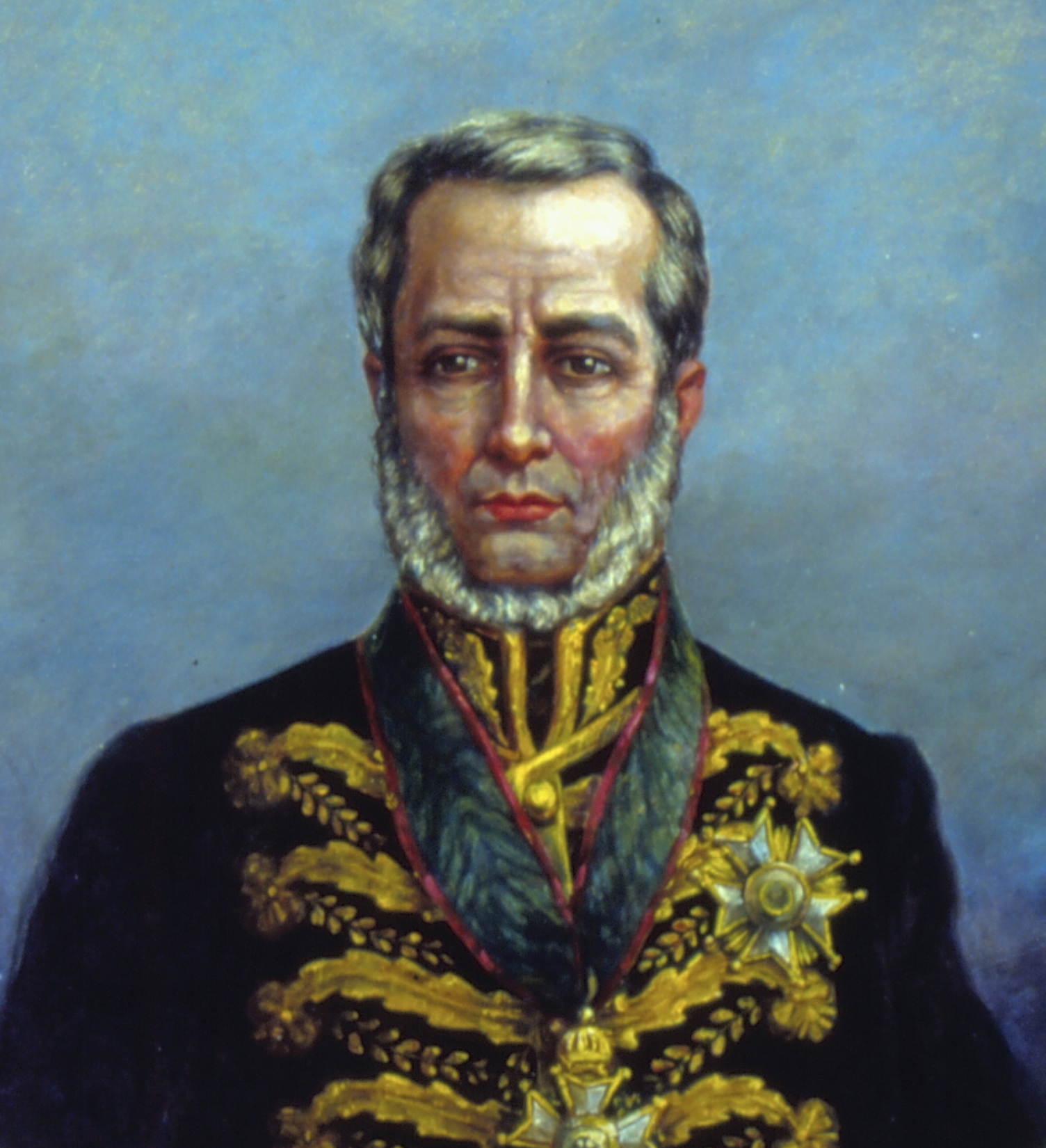
João Severiano Maciel da Costa, who served as occupied French Guiana's governor until 1817

Yeo was highly commended for his leadership during the operation, but his health had suffered during the extended campaigning in late December, and he was invalided to Rio de Janeiro to recover. On his return to active service, the Portuguese Prince Regent presented him with a diamond ring, and both the Portuguese and British Royal families knighted him for his service in the campaign. He was subsequently made commander of the frigate HMS Southampton. Four decades later the battle was among the actions recognised by the clasp "Confiance 14 Jany. 1809" attached to the Naval General Service Medal, awarded upon application to all British claimants.

After Napoleon's first abdication in 1814, it was decided that the colony would be returned to French control in the Treaty of Paris. Portugal and the restored Bourbon monarchy reached an agreement in the Final Act of the Congress of Vienna, by which Portugal committed itself to return the territory to France, keeping the Oyapock River as its border with Brazil as defined by the 1713 Treaty of Utrecht, and that a date for return would be determined "as soon as circumstances allow it". On 8 November 1817, a French fleet arrived with Cayenne's new governor, Claude Carra Saint-Cyr, to take formal repossession of the territory. The expedition was commanded by Alexandre Ferdinand Parseval-Deschenes, who then headed the French naval station in the colony for two years.
