= Andrew Pilkington =

British Army officer

Lieutenant-General Sir Andrew Pilkington KCB
- Born: c.1776
- Died: 23 February 1853 (aged 77); Catsfield Place, Sussex
- Spouse: Maria Elizabeth Gibbs
- Children: 2
- Relatives: Sir Vicary Gibbs (father in law)
- Military career
- Allegiance: United Kingdom
- Branch: British Army
- Service years: 1783–1853
- Rank: Lieutenant-General
- Conflicts: French Revolutionary Wars; Glorious First of June (WIA); West Indies campaign; Invasion of Trinidad; Irish Rebellion of 1798; Anglo-Russian Invasion of Holland; Capture of Kent (WIA); Napoleonic Wars; Hanover Expedition; War of 1812
- Awards: Naval General Service Medal

Lieutenant-General Sir Andrew Pilkington KCB (c.1776 – 23 February 1853) was a British Army officer who served through the Napoleonic Wars and War of 1812. He saw initial service fighting as a marine at the Glorious First of June in 1794 where he was wounded twice, and subsequently served with his regiment, the 2nd Regiment of Foot, at the Invasion of Trinidad in 1795. Having returned to Britain Pilkington helped defeat the Irish Rebellion of 1798 and in the following year was part of the Anglo-Russian invasion of Holland.

Pilkington began serving as a staff officer in 1800; while sailing to India in September his ship was captured by a French privateer, during which he was severely wounded. Released to continue on to India, Pilkington returned to Britain in 1803, subsequently serving as assistant adjutant general at Horse Guards for two years. Promoted to lieutenant-colonel in 1809, he was sent to Nova Scotia as deputy adjutant-general. During the War of 1812 Pilkington commanded two expeditions in Maine, capturing Moose Island in July 1814 and Machias in September. He continued on in Nova Scotia until 1816. Made a Knight Commander of the Order of the Bath in 1838, Pilkington received his final promotion, to lieutenant-general, in 1841.

== Early life ==
Andrew Pilkington was born about 1776, the second son of Thomas Pilkington, a member of the gentry from Bridgenorth. He had two brothers; Matthew, a reverend, and Thomas, a justice of the peace, and one sister, Mary Anne. His mother's maiden name was Phillips; she was the niece of an admiral.

== Military service ==
=== Early career and naval secondment ===
Pilkington joined the British Army as an ensign in an Independent Company on 7 March 1783 and was promoted to lieutenant in that company on 24 January 1791. Towards the start of 1793, with the French Revolutionary Wars ongoing, Pilkington transferred to the 2nd Regiment of Foot. Given command of the light company of the 2nd, Pilkington was sent to serve in the Channel Fleet with his men as marines. Stationed on board the 100-gun ship of the line HMS Royal George and under the command of Captain Love Parry Jones, he fought at the naval Glorious First of June on 1 June 1794, during which he was wounded by two splinters and had an epaulette shot off. In 1849 Pilkington received the Naval General Service Medal with a clasp for the battle.

Pilkington was promoted to captain on 2 March 1795, travelling with his regiment to serve in the West Indies Campaign in the same year. Still serving in the West Indies two years later, on 21 February 1797 Pilkington participated in the Invasion of Trinidad. After this he returned to Europe, being stationed in Ireland at the time of the Irish Rebellion of 1798 which he assisted in putting down. Continuing his wide-ranging service, in August 1799 Pilkington joined the Anglo-Russian invasion of Holland.

=== Staff officer ===
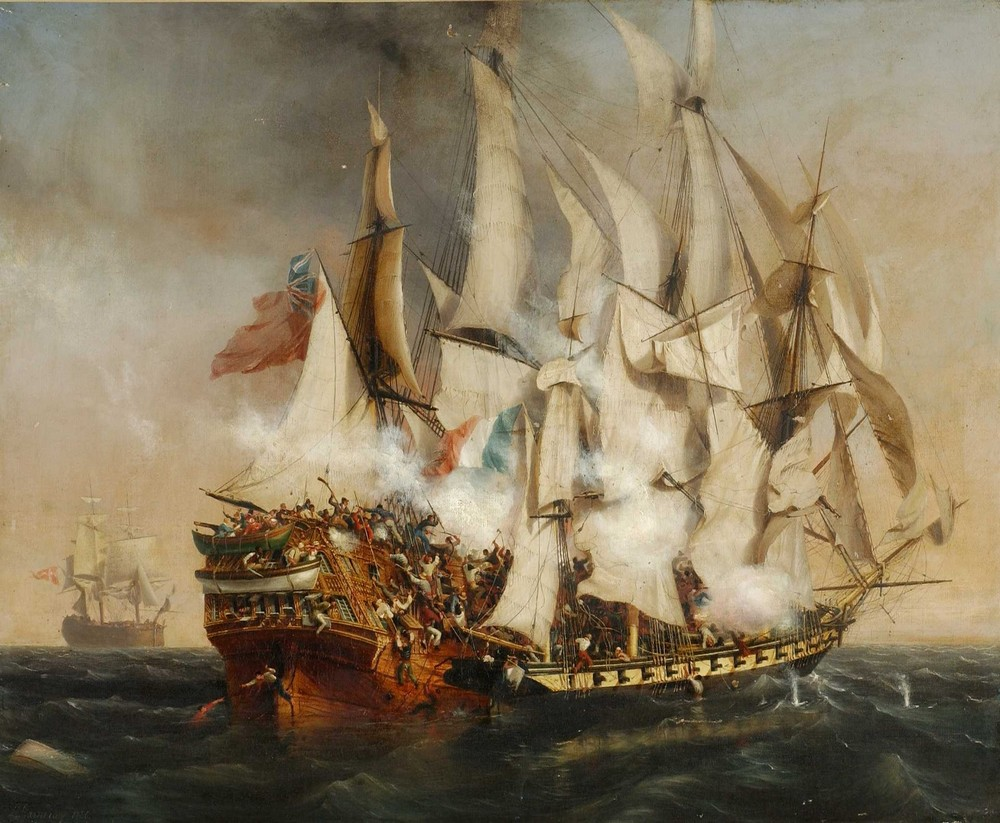
The capture of Kent by Confiance, during which Pilkington was wounded

Having returned from Holland, in 1800 Pilkington transferred to the 3rd Foot Guards. Appointed an aide de camp to Major-General Frederick St John, on 9 October Pilkington was sailing to India with the general on board the East Indiaman Kent when the ship was attacked by the 20-gun French privateer Confiance. Pilkington was severely wounded in the defence of the vessel, which lasted an hour and forty-seven minutes and ended when the French crew boarded Kent. Thirteen men from Kent were killed and forty-four wounded. Released to continue on to India, Pilkington eventually returned to England in 1803 during the Peace of Amiens. With the Napoleonic Wars underway, Pilkington was appointed an aide de camp to Major-General Alexander Mackenzie Fraser upon his return and subsequently was promoted to major on 31 March 1804. At the beginning of the following year Pilkington served in the short-lived Hanover Expedition, in which Fraser commanded a brigade. He then served as an assistant adjutant-general at Horse Guards between 1807 and 1808.

=== War of 1812 ===
==== Moose Island ====
Promoted to lieutenant-colonel on 5 October 1809, Pilkington was transferred to serve in Nova Scotia as the deputy adjutant-general at Halifax. During the subsequent War of 1812 Pilkington held several commands, including in 1814 for offensive operations in Passamaquoddy Bay. On 5 July that year he left Halifax with two troop transports carrying the 102nd Regiment of Foot, about 1,000 men. They joined with a naval force under Captain Sir Thomas Hardy at Shelburne on 7 July. The historian John Boileau describes Pilkington at this time as "an able officer who knew the local situation well". It was planned that the combined force would capture Moose Island and all the other islands in the bay between Maine and New Brunswick.

Hardy and Pilkington had chosen Shelburne to rendezvous at in order to keep the element of surprise over the Americans. They reached Eastport, the primary settlement on Moose Island, in the afternoon of 11 July. A subaltern was sent ashore with an ultimatum to the commanding officer of the 40th Infantry Regiment, Major Perley Putnam, requesting his surrender and noting that his garrison was vastly outnumbered and a successful defence impossible. Putnam was given five minutes to answer and initially rejected the demand, however he rescinded this decision as soon as Pilkington's troops began to board boats to make a landing. Fort Sullivan was also surrendered at the same time. Pilkington and Hardy then set about consolidating their control of Moose Island, on 14 July having the population either leave the island or become British citizens. Two thirds chose the latter option and Moose Island, along with others including Allen Island, were annexed to New Brunswick. Pilkington and Hardy left the island on 24 July, leaving behind a garrison of the 102nd which would become the last British troops to leave American soil when they finally departed from the island in 1818.

==== Machias ====
Pilkington subsequently took part in an expedition under Lieutenant-General John Coape Sherbrooke in Penobscot Bay from 1 September that captured Castine, Maine. As part of this campaign, on 9 September Pilkington was sent by Sherbrooke to capture Machias. For this Pilkington was given command of the 29th Regiment of Foot, parts of the 60th Regiment of Foot, and elements of the Royal Artillery. Escorted by ships commanded by Captain Hyde Parker, Pilkington's force landed at Bucks Harbour, 10 miles (16 km) from Machias, in the evening on 10 September. While aware of the danger of ambushes from American forces in the night, Pilkington chose to push on to keep the advantage. After completing what he described as a "most tedious and harassing march", Pilkington's force reached the rear of Fort O'Brien, 5 miles (8 km) south of Machias, in the morning of 11 September.

The fort was garrisoned by a mixture of regular American troops and militia, totalling about 100 men. Pilkington advanced on the rear of the fort, making its seaward-facing guns useless to defend against the attack. After pushing in several American pickets the British arrived at the fort to find that the defenders had abandoned it minutes beforehand, leaving everything intact. Pilkington complained that the speed of the American retreat meant he was unable to take many prisoners. He occupied Machias without resistance an hour later.

Pilkington began to plan an attack into inland Maine, but before he could begin this he was contacted by Brigadier-General John Brewer of the Massachusetts Militia on 13 September. Brewer announced that his forces, controlling Washington County, would not in any way make war against the British. The civil leaders of the county then sent a similar message to Pilkington, who as such was able to report to Sherbrooke that all of the country between the Passamaquoddy and Penobscot had been captured at the cost of only two British lives. Sherbrooke then began the process of consolidating the Castine area under British government. Pilkington was appointed a Companion of the Order of the Bath on 4 June 1815, and continued as deputy adjutant-general in Nova Scotia until August 1816 when he resigned.

=== Post-war ===
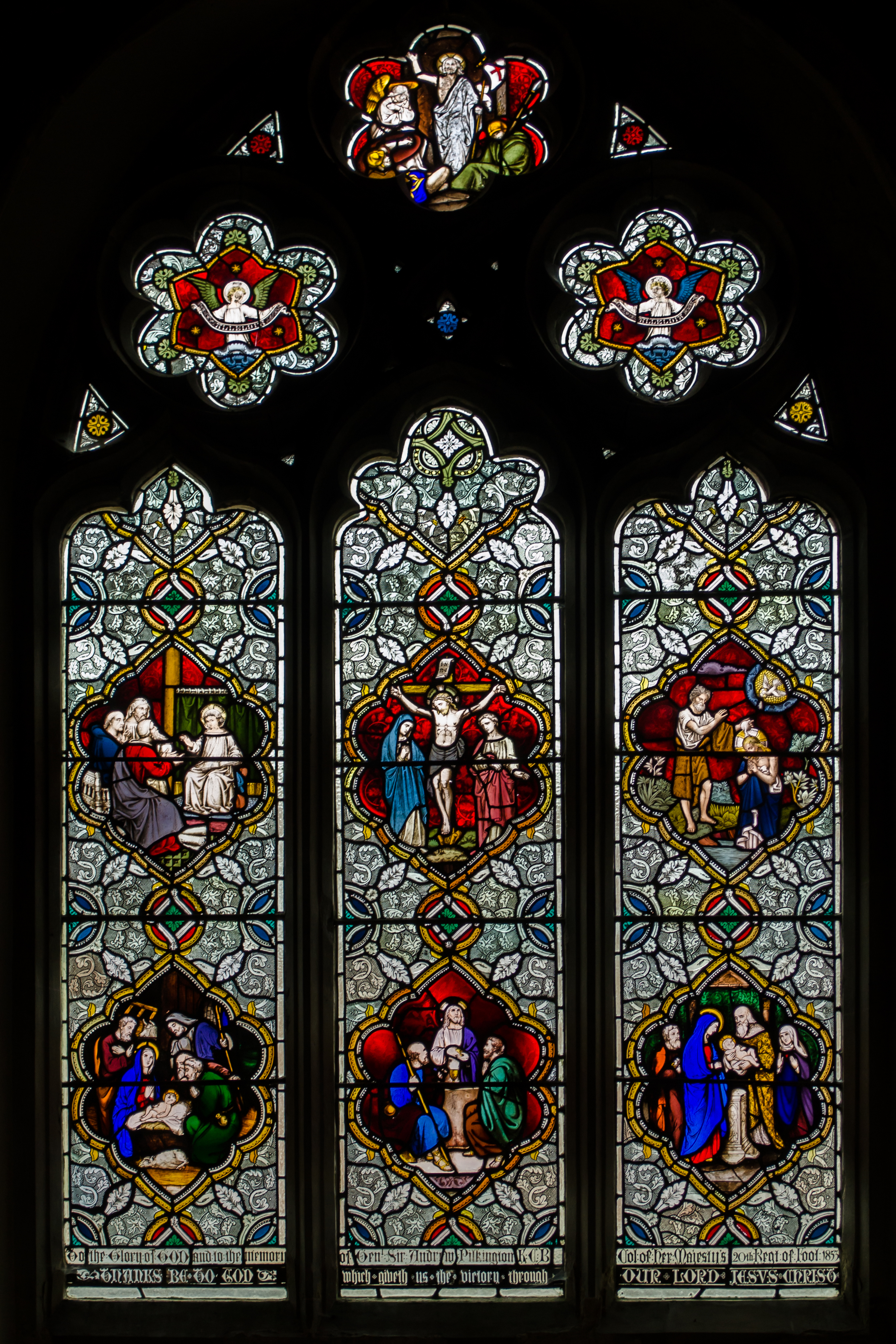
Stained glass window memorialising Pilkington in St Laurence's Church, Catsfield

Pilkington continued to receive promotion after the end of the wars, becoming a brevet colonel on 12 August 1819, at which time he was serving on half pay in the 2nd Ceylon Regiment. He was then advanced to major-general on 22 July 1830, and subsequently was created a Knight Commander of the Order of the Bath on 19 July 1838, before being promoted to lieutenant-general on 23 November 1841. In the same month as this he was appointed regimental colonel of the 82nd Regiment of Foot, from which position he transferred to the 20th Regiment of Foot in October 1850. In retirement he received a pension as a general officer who had completed distinguished military services. Pilkington died at his home, Catsfield Place, Sussex, on 23 February 1853, aged seventy-seven.

== Personal life ==
Pilkington married Maria Elizabeth Gibbs, the daughter of the judge Sir Vicary Gibbs, at Hayes on 9 May 1808. They would go on to have two daughters together, with all other three members of Pilkington's family outliving him:

- Maria Georgina Pilkington; married Burrell Hayley, rector of Catsfield, on 18 July 1848
- Louisa Elizabeth Pilkington; married Richard Thomas Lee on 1 September 1853

== Citations ==
Military offices
Preceded by Sir John Wilson	Colonel of the 82nd Regiment of Foot; 1841–1850	Succeeded by Francis Milman
Preceded by Sir James Burns	Colonel of the 20th Regiment of Foot; 1850–1853	Succeeded by Sir William Chalmers
