= John Littler =

John Littler may refer to:

- Sir John Hunter Littler, officer of the East India Company's Bengal Army
- John Littler (cricketer), English cricketer
