= Kent (1799 ship) =

Merchant ship

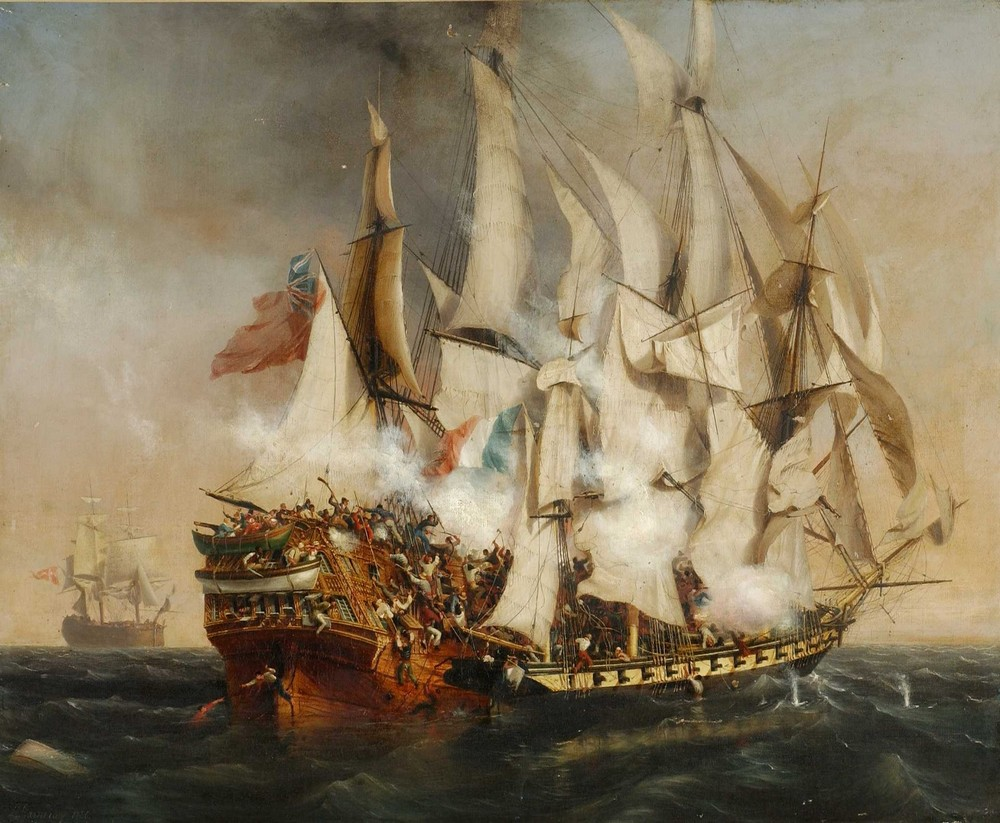
- Kent (left) being boarded by Confiance on 7 October 1800

History

East India Company
- Name: Kent
- Owner: Henry Bonham (principal managing owner)
- Builder: Thomas Pitcher, Northfleet
- Launched: 1799, or 10 February 1800,
- Fate: Captured 1800

Denmark
- Name: Cronberg

General characteristics
- Type: East Indiaman
- Tons burthen: 824, or 875 78/94 (bm)
- Length: 145 ft 6 in (44.35 m) (overall); 117 ft 11 in (35.94 m) (keel)
- Beam: 36 ft 3 in (11.05 m)
- Depth of hold: 14 ft 9 in (4.50 m)
- Complement: 100
- Armament: 1800:20 × 12-pounder long guns; 1801:6 × 6-pounder guns

Kent, launched in 1799, was an East Indiaman of the British East India Company. On her first voyage in 1800, she was on her way to Bengal and Bencoolen when the French privateer Robert Surcouf captured her near the mouth of the Ganges.

== Capture ==
Kent left Torbay on 3 May 1800. She was under the command of Robert Rivington, who sailed under a letter of marque dated 28 March 1800. At St. Salvador, she took on 300 persons, including troops and passengers, the survivors of the East Indiaman Queen, which had caught fire there and been destroyed, with in excess of 100 fatalities. Queen and Kent had left Torbay on the same day.

On 7 October, Kent encountered the French privateer corvette Confiance, of 18 guns and 150 men, under the command of Robert Surcouf. Kent and Confiance traded a few broadsides which did no damage, after which Surcouf noticed that Kent's defenders had few swords, pikes, and pistols, so Surcourf made the decision to board.

=== French account ===
At some point Kent had rescued the crew and passengers of another ship, destroyed by fire, and therefore had an exceptionally large complement. Including passengers, among whom there were some 100 soldiers, she had 437 persons aboard which was more than four times her normal complement. Surcouf managed to board his larger opponent, causing great confusion, and seized control of Kent. The British had 14 men killed, including Rivington, and 44 wounded, while the French suffered five men killed and ten wounded.

=== British account ===
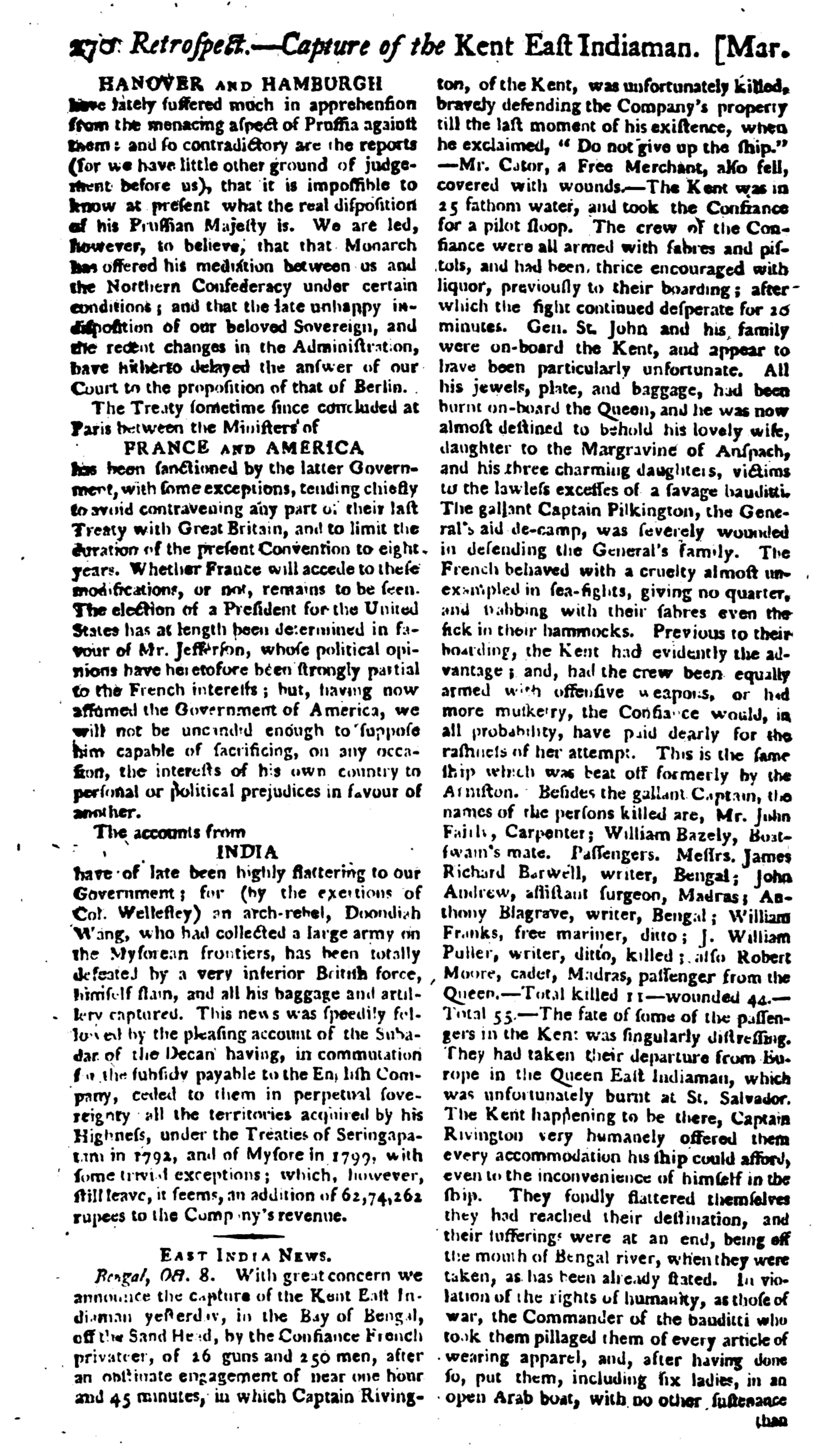
Account of the capture of Kent in The Gentleman's Magazine, October 1800

James reports that Kent fought for almost two hours and that Rivington was killed by a shot to the head as the French boarded. He states that Kent's armament consisted of twenty 12-pounders, and six 6-pounders on her castles, and that Confiance's armament consisted of between 20 and 22 long 8-pounder guns. He speculates that if Kent had carried 18 or 24-pounder carronades instead of the long 6-pounders, she might have been able to use grapeshot to deter boarding. He further reports that in addition to her crew of 100 or so, she had some 38 male and three female passengers, including seven or eight passengers that she had picked up at St. Salvador, after a fire there had destroyed the Indiaman Queen on 9 July. Apparently some four or five passengers were among the British dead, and there were also passengers among the wounded. (Note: He makes no mention of any soldiers, though other evidence strongly suggests that they were aboard.) James attributes the crew being overwhelmed by the boarders to a shortage of swords, pikes, and pistols.

Another account estimates the number of persons on Kent as under 200, and gives the casualties as 11 killed and 44 wounded on the British side, and 16 wounded (of whom three later died), on the French side. The passengers included Major-General Frederick St John, his wife, three daughters, two other women, and St. John's aide, Captain Andrew Pilkington, who had been wounded. Surcouf put them into a passing Arab merchantman and they arrived shortly thereafter in Calcutta. Ensign John Hunter Littler was another passenger; he was put aboard a pinnace to complete his journey to India.

=== Aftermath ===
Surcouf put his first officer, Joachim Drieux, aboard Kent, together with a 60-man prize crew. Surcouf released the passengers on a merchantman that he stopped a few days later. Confiance and Kent arrived at the Rade des Pavillons in Port Louis, Mauritius, in November. The capture of Kent became a sensation, and the British Admiralty promised a large reward for the capture of Surcouf.

Her captors sold Kent for 30,900 piastres to a Danish shipping company, which renamed her Cronberg. She left Mauritius on 21 March 1801, but as she approached Denmark passing vessels informed her that a British fleet had attacked Copenhagen; she therefore waited for some weeks off the coast of Norway before it was safe to proceed, and arrived in Kristiansand in June 1801, and later at Copenhagen on 16 July.

The EIC put the value of its cargo lost on Kent at £28,676.
