= John Hunter Littler =

British army officer (1793-1856)

Lieutenant-General Sir John Hunter Littler KCB
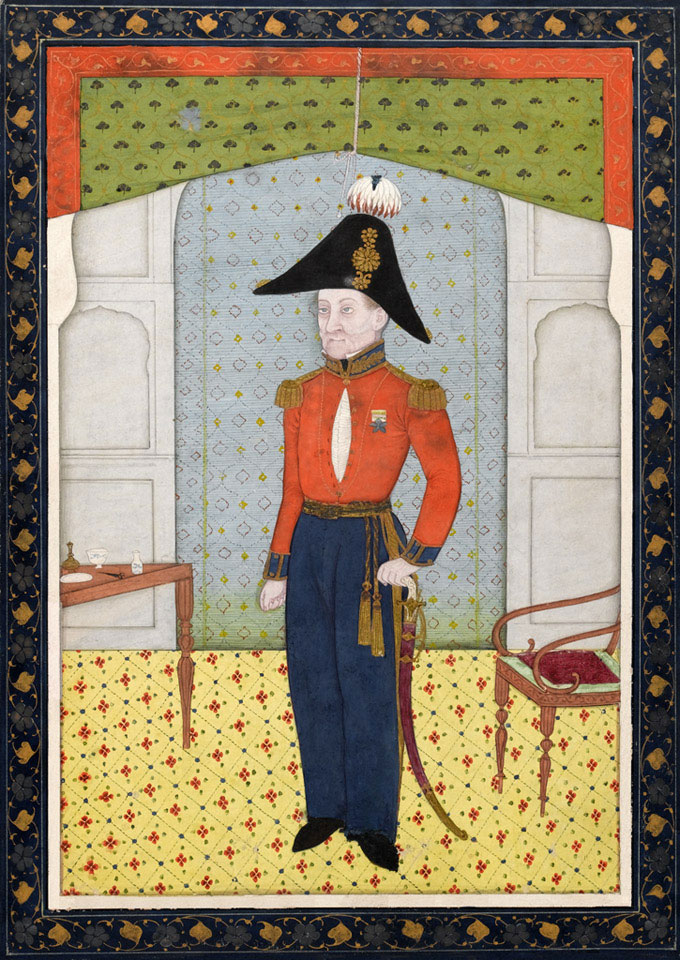
- Company style portrait of Littler, c. 1848
- Born: 6 January 1783; Tarvin, Cheshire
- Died: 18 February 1856 (aged 73); Buckfastleigh, Devon
- Burial place: Tarvin, Cheshire
- Spouse: Helen Olympia Stewart
- Children: Four daughters
- Military career
- Allegiance: East India Company; United Kingdom
- Branch: Bengal Army; British Army
- Service years: 1800–1856
- Rank: Lieutenant-General
- Unit: Bengal Army
- Conflicts: Second Anglo-Maratha War; Invasion of Java; Gwalior campaign; First Anglo-Sikh War

Lieutenant-General Sir John Hunter Littler, KCB (6 January 1783 – 18 February 1856) was a British Army officer who spent most of his career serving in the Bengal Army. He was commissioned as an ensign of the Bengal Native Infantry at the age of 17 and sailed for India. He travelled aboard the East Indiaman Kent, which was captured by the French en route, and he had to make the final part of the voyage by pinnace. He served as a junior officer in the Second Anglo-Maratha War and the 1811 invasion of Java.

In 1841 Littler was promoted to major-general and given command of a division. He served in the 1843 Gwalior campaign, for which he received the thanks of the British parliament and appointment as Companion of the Order of the Bath. During the 1845–46 First Anglo-Sikh War he led a division at the Battle of Ferozeshah, once more receiving the thanks of parliament. Littler commanded the British occupational forces in the Sikh capital of Lahore after the war. In 1848 he joined the Supreme Council of India and was appointed deputy governor of Bengal and a Knight Commander of the Order of the Bath. He returned to England in 1851 and spent his final years in retirement in Buckfastleigh.

== Early life ==
John Hunter Littler was born in Tarvin, Cheshire, on 6 January 1783. He was the son of Thomas Littler, whose family had lived in the village for generations, and Diana, daughter of John Hunter, a director of the East India Company (EIC). John Littler was educated at the grammar school in Acton.

== East India Company junior and field officer ==
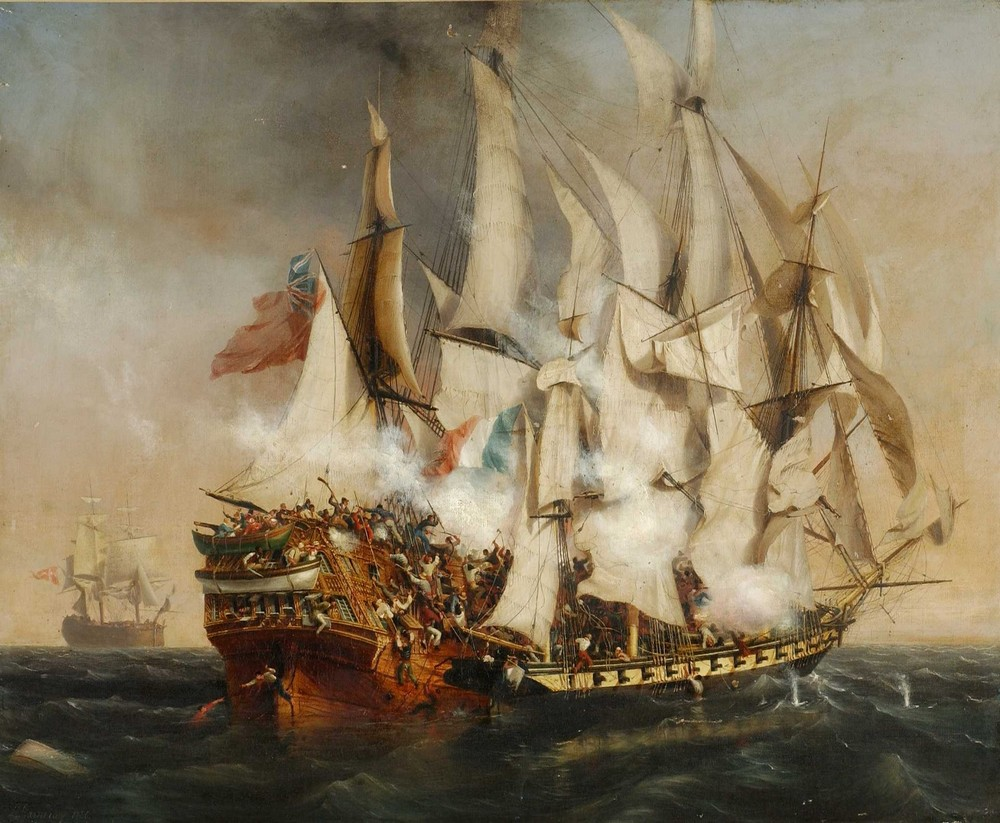
The capture of Kent

Littler was appointed as an ensign in the EIC's Bengal Army on 19 August 1800, being posted to the 10th Regiment of Bengal Native Infantry. Littler travelled to India aboard the 38-gun East Indiaman Kent, in company with 400 other soldiers. On 7 October the Kent was intercepted in the Bay of Bengal by the 24-gun French privateer Confiance under Robert Surcouf. After a brief combat, in which her captain was killed, Kent surrendered. The Kent was taken as a prize by Surcouf but the passengers were released and put aboard a pinnace, which made it safely to British India.

Littler was promoted to lieutenant on 29 November 1800 and served during 1804–05 in Lord Lake's army during the Second Anglo-Maratha War. Littler participated in the 1811 expedition that captured Java from the French and was promoted to captain on 16 December 1812. He returned to India in 1816 and served in Lord Hastings' army as a sub-assistant commissary-general until 1824. He was promoted to major on 22 September 1824.

Littler married Helen Olympia Stewart, the daughter of a lieutenant-colonel who claimed a peerage on Orkney, on 25 June 1827. He had previously been married and his wife had presumably died. Littler had four daughters with Helen. He was promoted to lieutenant-colonel of the 14th Bengal Native Infantry in 1828 and became colonel of the 36th Bengal Native Infantry in 1839.

== General officer ==
Littler was promoted to major-general in the East India Company in 1841, receiving the equivalent brevet rank in the British Army on 23 November. From 1843 Littler commanded the Bengal Army's Agra division. He commanded part of Sir Hugh Gough's army during the 1843 Gwalior campaign against the Marathas. At the 29 December Battle of Maharajpore, Littler had two horses shot from under him and was slightly wounded. For his services he received the thanks of parliament, the Gwalior Star and was appointed a Companion of the Order of the Bath on 2 May 1844.

The 1845 outbreak of the First Anglo-Sikh War found him in command of a division of East India Company troops at Ferozepore. He left half his men to defend the post and marched with the rest to confront the Sikh Army as they crossed the Sutlej river on 11 December. The Sikhs refused to engage and moved to Ferozeshah. Littler joined his force with that of Gough and commanded a division of the army during the 21–22 December Battle of Ferozeshah. Littler had another horse shot from beneath him and, after victory, once more received a vote of thanks from the British parliament.

After the war, Littler was appointed to command British troops occupying the Sikh capital, Lahore. In 1848 Littler was appointed to the Supreme Council of India and made deputy governor of Bengal. On 31 January of the same year he was appointed a Knight Commander of the Order of the Bath.

== Later life and death ==
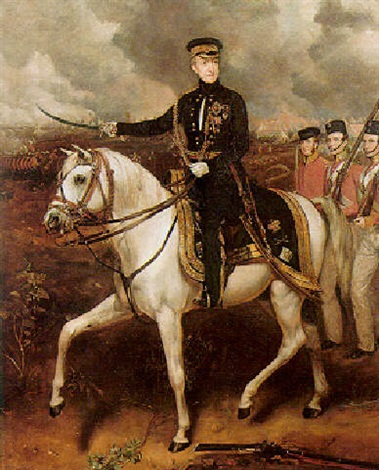
A Stephen Pearce portrait of Littler as a lieutenant-general

Littler returned to England in 1851. He spent the remainder of his life in retirement at his house, Bigaden, in Buckfastleigh, Devon. On 11 November 1851 he was appointed brevet lieutenant-general in the British Army. Littler died at Bigaden on 18 February 1856 and was buried at Tarvin.

Helen remarried, in 1858, to Thomas Aston Cokayne. She died on 12 January 1885.
