= Muckle Hart of Benmore =

The Muckle Hart of Benmore (Note: Muckle is a Lowland Scots word meaning "large", "hart" is an archaic word for a mature male red deer or stag and Beinn Mhòr is a mountain in Sutherland, northern Scotland.) was the name given to a red deer stag that was stalked (hunted) by the 19th-century naturalist and hunter Charles William George St John. In his book Short Sketches of the Wild Sports and Natural History of the Highlands, he described the continuous hunt of the stag for six days and five nights, culminating in its dramatic demise on 1 October 1833. St John's account of the stalk was widely republished, and the deer has been described as "the most famous red stag to be recorded in the annals of British sport".

== Background and publication history ==
Charles St John was an aristocratic Englishman with a lifelong interest in natural history who settled in Scotland as a young man, initially at Rosehall in Sutherland in about 1833. He spent the rest of his life fishing, shooting and observing wildlife. On 1 October 1833 he killed a large red deer stag named the Muckle Hart of Benmore.

St John's account of his pursuit of the Muckle Hart was first published in 1845, incorporated into a book review written by his friend Cosmo Innes. St John later wrote an account of the pursuit in the 1846 book The Wild Sports and Natural History of the Scottish Highlands, in which he described his encounter with the Muckle Hart in more detail. The story was re-published and anthologized widely.

== St John's account of the stalk ==
On a Sunday, Malcolm, the shepherd, reports to St John that he has seen the track of a hart of extraordinary size which he guesses must be the "muckle hart of Benmore" notorious for its "wonderful size and cunning".

The next day, St John sets off with his trusty servant, Donald, and Bran the dog. They shoot a wildcat but see no sign of the stag. They stay the night with Malcolm at his shieling (in Scots language, a shepherd's hut used during summer grazing), and the next morning they spy the stag but, when they attempt to stalk him, he winds them. They return to the shieling.

On the Wednesday, St John helps Malcolm by hiding in a hole beside a dead sheep and shooting two golden eagles which had been killing his sheep. They resume the hunt but see no sign of the stag and sleep in a "niche in the rocks".

On Thursday, they see a footprint but dark falls amid heavy rain. In the darkness they hear a fiddle and wade a burn (small river) waist deep to enter a bothy (basic shelter) occupied by illicit whisky distillers, where they spend the night and Donald becomes drunk.

On Friday, St John resumes the hunt alone but becomes lost in the mist. He shoots and eats two grouse and bivouacs in the heather.

Saturday breaks fresh and sunny. St John spies the stag and stalks him but can only take a frontal shot which nevertheless appears to kill the hart. St John lays down his rifle and approaches the prone stag with his knife. When he grabs an antler to bleed the animal it springs up and throws him to the ground. Cornered against a bank, St John throws his plaid over the stag's head and stabs him with his knife. The stag stands at bay in a loch while St John finds he has to pare a bullet with his knife to fit it into the rifle before he can shoot the hart in the head.

== The trophy ==
In his accounts, St John does not describe the antlers other than to comment on first seeing the hart: "What a stretch of antler!" St John's descendants reported that the Muckle Hart was a very heavy stag weighing 30 stone (420 lb; 190 kg). Years after the stalk, Lionel Edwards and Harold Frank Wallace examined the mounted antlers of the Muckle Hart, which they described as "a well shaped head with thick horn, and very good brow points 13 inches long". Their photograph of the mounted head appears in their 1927 book Hunting and Stalking the Deer.

== Legacy and analysis ==
The Muckle Hart became legendary and was influential in the development of Scottish red deer stalking. The Muckle Hart has been described as "the most famous Scottish head which has ever been killed, probably the most famous head ever killed, at any rate to the English speaking world." St John's account of the stalk has been described as a "classic for all time" among deer-stalkers.

In the 21st century, St John's account has been taken as an exemplar of the romanticised 19th-century combat between the hardy English stalker alone in the wild Scottish Highlands and the massive, noble, native Scottish antlered red deer stag. It is an example of the often embellished accounts of deer-stalking in "florid prose" characteristic of the era; Hayden Lorimer describes St John's account as "scarcely credible".

St John's account of the stalk of the Muckle Hart has been retold by many authors.

== Works cited ==
- Edwards, Lionel; Wallace, Harold Frank (1927). Hunting and Stalking the Deer. London: Longmans.
