= Frederick St John (British Army officer) =

Officer of the British Army and politician (1765–1844)

General The Honourable Frederick St John
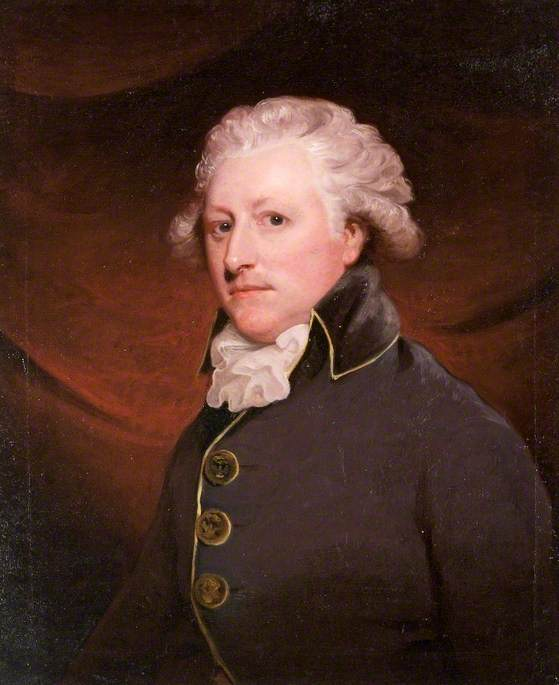
- Portrait after John Hoppner
- Born: 20 December 1765; Wiltshire
- Died: 19 November 1844 (aged 78); Rose Heath Cottage, Lewes
- Education: Harrow School
- Relatives: Frederick St John, 2nd Viscount Bolingbroke (father); Lady Diana Spencer (mother)
- Military career
- Allegiance: United Kingdom
- Branch: British Army
- Service years: 1779–1844
- Rank: General
- Conflicts: French Revolutionary Wars; Irish Rebellion of 1798; Napoleonic Wars; Second Anglo-Maratha War; Battle of Delhi

Arms of St John: Argent, on a chief gules two mullets or

General Frederick St John (20 December 1765 – 19 November 1844) was an officer of the British Army and a politician. He rose to the rank of general during his career and saw service during the French Revolutionary and Napoleonic Wars, and the Second Anglo-Maratha War. He also sat briefly for the constituency of Oxford.

== Family and early life ==
Frederick St John was born the second son of Frederick St John, 2nd Viscount Bolingbroke and Lady Diana Beauclerk.

St John enlisted in the Army as an ensign in the 85th Regiment of Foot in 1779, at the age of 14. He served in the Indies and the Channel Islands until 1783. He was promoted to lieutenant in 1780, and then became a captain in the 95th Regiment of Foot in 1781. This was followed by a promotion to be major in the 104th Regiment of Foot in 1783.

In parallel to his military career, he socialised in exclusive gentlemen's clubs: he joined Brooks's on 17 May 1783, and the Whig Club on 6 March 1787. He continued to rise through the ranks, becoming a lieutenant-colonel in the 2nd Regiment of Foot in 1791, a colonel in 1795, and being promoted to major-general in 1798.

== French Revolutionary Wars ==
St John served in Ireland in 1798 as the lieutenant of General Gerard Lake, and followed him to India when he was appointed Commander-in-Chief of the British forces in the colony.

In 1800, St John took passage with his wife, Arabella Craven, on the Queen, which caught fire and was destroyed while in harbour in Salvador. St John and his wife then joined the East Indiaman Kent to complete the journey. On 7 October, Kent was captured by the French privateer Confiance, under Robert Surcouf. St John was taken prisoner and exchanged.

St John went on to take part in the Battle of Delhi in 1803, and in the siege of Agra. He was promoted to lieutenant-general in 1805, and general in 1814.

== Political career ==
St John was elected to Parliament in 1818 as member for Oxford and represented the constituency until his defeat at the 1820 general election two years later.

== Family and issue ==
St John married three times. His first wife was Lady Mary Kerr, the daughter of William Kerr, 5th Marquess of Lothian, whom he married on 8 December 1788. They had one son:

- Robert William St John (5 February 1791 – 19 November 1844), consul-general at Algiers, married Eliza Maria Barker

Lady Mary died the day after her son's birth.

On 6 April 1793, St John married Arabella Craven (died 9 June 1819), daughter of William Craven, 6th Baron Craven and Elizabeth Craven. They had five sons and four daughters:

- Rev. George William St John (4 May 1796 – ?), rector of Stanton Lacy, married Henrietta Frances Magrath in 1830
- Maj. George Frederick Berkeley St John (2 October 1797 – ?), married Henrietta Louisa Jephson on 18 January 1836
- Henry John St John (1798 – 7 August 1821)
- Maria Arabella St John (25 July 1807 – ?), married Rev. Charles Goring, son of Sir Charles Foster Goring, 7th Baronet on 2 October 1832
- Catherine Frederica Mary St John (October 1808 – 5 May 1809)
- Charles William George St John (1809–1856)
- Louisa Diana St John (24 December 1810 – ?), married Richard Vincent on 22 January 1846
- Keppel St John (26 February 1812 – 7 June 1813)
- Elizabeth St John (11 July 1814 – 27 October 1846), married Rev. George Carter on 9 March 1841

On 14 November 1821, he married Caroline Parsons. They had two sons together:

- Henry Edward St John (22 November 1823 – ?)
- Welbore William Oliver St John (12 April 1825 – ?)

St John died on 19 November 1844 at the age of 78. He was by then the second most senior general in the British Army.

== Bibliography ==
- Laughton, John Knox (1887). Studies in Naval History. Longmans, Green, and co. Archived from the original on 10 August 2017.

Parliament of the United Kingdom
Preceded by John Atkyns-Wright; John Ingram Lockhart	Member of Parliament for Oxford; 1818–1820; With: John Atkyns-Wright	Succeeded by Charles Wetherell; John Ingram Lockhart
