= Voador (1790 ship) =

Portuguese brig

History

Portugal
- Name: Voador
- Owner: Kingdom of Portugal
- Builder: Torcato José Clavina
- Laid down: 1790
- Launched: 1790
- Status: 1823 transferred to the Brazilian Navy

General characteristics
- Tons burthen: (bm)
- Length: 29.57 m (97 ft 0 in)
- Beam: 9.14 m (30 ft 0 in)
- Sail plan: Brigantine
- Complement: 136
- Armament: 24 guns

Voador was a brig launched in 1790, at Lisbon. In 1808–1809, she was one of the vessels in the small Anglo-Portuguese squadron that captured French Guiana. In 1820, she was re-classed as a corvette. In 1823, she was transferred to the Brazilian Navy.

== Career ==
In 1790, Voador was under the command of First Lieutenant Jaime Scarnichia and part of the Straits Squadron that crossed the Mediterranean.

In 1791, Voador sailed in the squadron of Captain Paulo José da Silva Gama, convoying vessels to India.

In 1792 Voador left on a diplomatic mission to Sardinia.

In 1793, Voador was part of the squadron of Lieutenant General José Sanches de Brito that the Portuguese Navy provided to assist the British Royal Navy's Channel Fleet.

In 1794, Voador served in the Straits Squadron under Commodore Pedro de Mariz de Sousa Sarmento. She sailed with the squadron to England.

In 1795, Voador left for Gibraltar, in the Squadron of Commodore Joaquim Francisco de Melo e Póvoas.

In 1797, Voador sailed to Brazil in the squadron Commodore António Januário do Vale with the mission of escorting a large convoy.

In 1807, Voador was part of the fleet that carried the Royal Family to Brazil.

In 1808–1809, as a brig of 22 guns, Voador was one of the vessels in the small Anglo-Portuguese squadron, which included Vingança, all under Captain James Lucas Yeo in HMS Confiance, that captured French Guiana.

In 1816, Voador left Lisbon for Rio de Janeiro. She was part of the squadron under Commodore Rodrigo José Ferreira Lobo, whose mission it was to escort the expedition of Lieutenant General Carlos Frederico Lecor.

In 1820, Voador was reclassified as a corvette.

In 1821, Voador left Rio de Janeiro for Portugal with squadron under Commodore D. João Manuel, Count of Viana, carried D. João VI, the Royal Family and many other official.

In her career, Voador carried out a number of other missions, escorting vessels to the north of Portugal, visiting Tangier and Setúbal, and cruising the Portuguese coast.

== Fate ==
In 1823, Voador left for Brazil, carrying the Count of Rio Maior and Councillor Francisco José Vieira. The Portuguese government transferred her to the new Brazilian Navy.
