= Vingança (1800 ship) =

Portuguese naval vessel (1800–1814)

History

Portugal
- Name: Vingança
- Namesake: Revenge
- Owner: Kingdom of Portugal
- Acquired: 1800
- Status: 1814 broken up

General characteristics
- Tons burthen: (bm)
- Sail plan: 1800: cutter; 1804: Brig
- Complement: 97
- Armament: 18 guns

Vingança was a cutter launched in 1800 that the Portuguese Navy purchased in Lisbon. She was converted to a brig in 1804. She captured two vessels, carried out several missions, including escorting the Royal Family to Brazil, and participated in an Anglo-Portuguese force that captured French Guiana. She was broken up at Rio de Janeiro in 1814.

== Career ==
As a coast guard vessel, between 1800 and 1801 she convoyed vessels from America to Oporto, a cattle convoy from Tangier to Vila Real de Santo António, and carried out a commission to Lagos.

In 1801 she captured a French privateer.

On 13 October 1804, the navy converted her to an 18-gun brig.

In January 1805, Vingança left for Tangier accompanied by the ship Vasco da Gama and frigate Princesa do Brasil. In June 1805, she was part of the Straits squadron.

In February 1806 she carried out a mission to the Islands. In April she was on the Straits station. In August she captured a Tripolitanian polacca in the Straits of Gibraltar.

In April 1807, Vingança was again on the Straits station. In November 1807, she sailed for Brazil as part in the squadron that transported the Royal Family there. In May 1808, she was stationed at Rio de Janeiro.

In 1808–1809, together with Voador, Vingança was one of the vessels in the small Anglo-Portuguese squadron under Captain James Lucas Yeo in HMS Confiance that captured French Guiana.

In 1810 Vingança sailed to the Straits where she was part of the naval squadron headed by the frigate Benjamin that was sent to Peniche to retrieve the ill.

== Fate ==
In 1814 Vingança was broken up in Rio de Janeiro.
