= Manuel Marques (general) =

Brazilian general (1762–1824)

Manuel Marques ComA ComNSC

Portuguese Governor of French Guiana
- In office January 1809 – October 1809
- Preceded by: Victor Hugues
- Succeeded by: Pedro Alexandrino Pinto de Sousa

Personal details
- Born: 2 February 1762 Penamacor, Portugal
- Died: 1824 (aged 61–62) Belém, Brazil
- Spouse: Madalena Rosa (m. 1786)
- Children: 2

Military service
- Allegiance: Portugal; UK of Portugal, Brazil and the Algarves; Brazil
- Years of service: 1780–1824
- Rank: Field marshal
- Unit: Estremoz Artillery Regiment; Pará Artillery Corps
- Battles/wars: War of the Oranges; Siege of Campo Maior (1801); Napoleonic Wars; Caribbean campaign of 1803–1810; Capture of Cayenne; Brazilian War of Independence

Manuel Marques (Note: In the old spelling: Manoel Marques. He is sometimes referred to by the surname "Elvas Portugal", although he has never used it. See Name.) (2 February 1762 – 1824) was a Portuguese-born Brazilian general. He is primarily known for having commanded the Portuguese troops during the capture of French Guiana in 1809.

== Biography ==
=== Early life and military career ===
Manuel Marques was born in the town of Penamacor, Portugal, on 2 February 1762, to Domingos Marques and Ana Teresa de Elvas Portugal. He was determined to pursue a military career and, in 1780, without his parents' consent, he enlisted in the Estremoz Artillery Regiment, which at that time was commanded by the future general de Valleré.

He began attending military training courses, completed the programme, and rose through the lower ranks by passing examinations until he was promoted to officer by merit.

In 1801, during the War of the Oranges, Manuel Marques was a first lieutenant commanding the artillery at the garrison of Campo Maior, which was came under siege by the Spaniards. After distinguishing himself in the defence of the town, lifting of the siege, he was promoted to captain and publicly awarded the medal of the Order of St Benedict of Avis by the Prince Regent himself.

In 1803, an artillery corps was formed to defend the strategic city of Belém, the capital of the Captaincy of Grão-Pará, situated at the mouth of the Amazon River. As Manuel Marques was in Lisbon at the time, he was put in charge of organising and training this new unit. He was subsequently appointed its commander and promoted to lieutenant-colonel, after which he departed for South America.

=== Conquest of French Guiana ===
While Prince Regent John was in Brazil, and Portugal was suffering the consequences of the invasion of its territory by Napoleon Bonaparte's troops, it was decided to conquer and possess French Guiana in the middle of 1808. To this end, the necessary orders were issued to Lieutenant General Magalhães de Meneses, governor of Pará, so that he would send land and sea forces to militarily occupy the right bank of the Oyapock River, the border between France and northern Brazil.

By virtue of this order, the forces of these two expeditions were organized, with command falling to Lieutenant Colonel Manuel Marques, who had under his orders several officers and four hundred soldiers from the grenadier and caçadores companies of the line regiments, with a battery of 4 cannons and 2 howitzers.

The naval force consisted of a schooner with 12 vessels; comprising two cutters, each with 8 oars; three gunboats, each with a swivel gun; one smack and further transport vessels for the troops. On 8 October 1808, the expedition set sail for the town of Chaves, where it was reinforced by the 2nd Regiment, which was garrisoned there.

On 2 November, it set course for Cabo Norte, passing amongst the great number of islands at the mouth of the Amazon, braving the enormous dangers posed by the pororocas, and finally managing to round the cape on the night of the 12th, amidst heavy rain and thick fog.

Once the expedition had entered the Oyapock River, the troops were disembarked, and the solemn ceremony of taking possession took place on 1 December, followed by preparations for the attack on the Fort of São Luiz, which was found a few days later on the right bank further upstream, though buried and its walls overgrown with vegetation.

The expedition, reinforced with 300 more soldiers from Pará on other ships under the command of Captain James Lucas Yeo, was divided into two commands. The naval forces were assigned to this command, while Lieutenant Colonel Manuel Marques was solely responsible for the land forces. In complete agreement, they resolved to conquer the city of Cayenne, according to the orders received from Rio de Janeiro, thus taking possession of the entire French colony. However, they were warned that the governor of Cayenne had noticed the approaching attack and had the batteries on the left bank of the Maroni River garrisoned. They did not hesitate, and the assault on those positions was decided upon. The first assault took place in the early morning of 6 January 1809, with the aid of canoes and boats. Fort Diamant was taken by surprise, followed shortly by Fort Trio, leaving the invading Degrad des Canes in control of the left bank of the Maroni River, which allowed free entry for all their vessels.

Repelled, the French attempted an assault on the Brazilian troops during the night, but were unsuccessful, retreating in confusion and leaving 17 dead in the field.

The path was thus completely unimpeded for the invaders, who on the 8th of the same month moved towards the interior of the island and, taking up positions at the site of Bouregard, summoned Governor Victor Hugues, who requested an armistice, which was granted to him.

On the 12th, after the capitulation was discussed, it was signed by the aforementioned governor, Lieutenant Colonel Manuel Marques and Captain Yeo, with the Brazilian troops then proceeding the following day to seize the town of Cayenna, which they effectively did on the 14th, with due formalities.

Days after the capitulation, Lieutenant Colonel Manuel Marques created a board composed of the most notable inhabitants, which, under his presidency, dealt with the administrative affairs of the colony.

This board was advisory and deliberative, and its acts were promulgated by Lieutenant Colonel Manuel Marques, as governor, and published in his name for due effect.

Business in the colony proceeded with enviable regularity, but the ambition of an officer in the Brazilian forces attempted to disrupt it, and, taking advantage of the complaints of some soldiers who could not adapt to the local food, he caused them to rebel against their esteemed governor, and one day in the month of June, the garrison was formed, with the aforementioned officer at its head.

Aware of what was happening, Lieutenant Colonel Manuel Marques hurriedly appeared before his subordinates and, inquiring about the reason for this formation, which had not been preceded by his order, the undisciplined officer replied that the troops wanted him to leave the government so that he could be sworn in.

Indignant at this response from his immediate superior, Manuel Marques resolutely addressed the mutineers, who, with his forceful words, were convinced that they had been wickedly deceived and thus led to commit a grave crime, the punishment for which was the most severe. Lieutenant Colonel Manuel Marques ordered them then they were to return to their barracks, and this was religiously obeyed.

Bringing this unfortunate occurrence to the attention of the governor of the captaincy of Pará, he made him aware of how displeased he was, and therefore requested to be replaced, which was granted, passing his duties to the colonel of engineers Pedro Alexandrino Pinto de Sousa.

However, upon hearing at the Court the successful conquest made by Lieutenant Colonel Manuel Marques, Prince Regent John, by royal decree of 30 May 1809, promoted him to the rank of brigadier of infantry "in recognition of the valor and military intelligence with which he conducted himself in commanding the expedition ordered against Cayenne and French Guiana, in whose conquest heaven deigned to bless his arms, remaining in the government of the same conquered provinces, which became dependent on the captaincy of Pará".

=== Later life ===
After the death of the governor of Pará, José Narciso de Magalhães de Meneses, on 20 December 1810, Marques, because of his rank, took charge of the government until February 1812, when he was replaced by Brigadier José Pereira Vidigal.

At the request of the general superintendent of police, desembargador João Severiano Maciel da Costa, he returned to that colony as its military governor and remained there in the best harmony with the aforementioned judge, until this possession was returned to France in a solemn act, which took place on 21 November 1817, with the presence of Lieutenant General Count of Carra Saint-Cyr, its new governor, accompanied by his entire general staff.

Having sent the Brazilian forces ashore bound for the coast of Brazil in February, General Manuel Marques followed them shortly afterwards with his family and officers of his general staff, disembarking at the port of Belém on 20 February 1818. On 19 May 1819, he was promoted to effective field marshal.

He was nominated inspector of the line troops of Pará by decree of 20 October 1819, position he held when Brazil declared its independence from Portugal in 1822. Having joined the cause, he fought against the loyalist forces led by Governor of Arms José Maria de Moura during the Brazilian War of Independence.

He died in Belém in 1824, where he was buried. He was awarded the commanderies of the Order of Avis and the Order of the Conception of Vila Viçosa. Brazilian historian Melo Morais stated that "Marshal Manuel Marques was such a skilled gunner that, during an artillery drill, he managed to hit the same target three times: he was undoubtedly the finest artillerist in Portugal and Brazil."

He was married to Madalena Rosa, with whom he had two children: Maria Carolina Marques, who married in Pará, and Francisco Marques de Elvas Portugal, who became a lieutenant colonel and was commander of a corps. Francisco died without issue after travelling to Portugal to receive treatment for an illness.

== Name ==
Brazilian historians such as Clóvis Beviláqua, Father Rafael Maria Galanti, Rocha Pombo and Varnhagen were at odds over his name. Whilst Oliveira Lima always referred to him simply as ‘Manuel Marques’, the others mentioned above added the surname Elvas Portugal. Rocha Pombo even went so far as to mistakenly refer to him as Manuel Marques de Sousa, mistaking him for one of the three generations of generals from Rio Grande do Sul. In fact, his real name was Manuel Marques, which was the name he always used to sign all documents and correspondence. He never used his family surname, Elvas Portugal.
