= Charles William George St John =

English naturalist and sportsman

Charles William George St. John (3 December 1809 – 22 July 1856), was an English naturalist and sportsman, and son of General the Hon. Frederick St John, second son of Frederick St John, 2nd Viscount Bolingbroke, was born on 3 December 1809 at Chailey, Sussex.

St. John was educated at Midhurst, Sussex, and about 1828 obtained a clerkship in the treasury, but resigned in 1834, in which year in November he married Ann Gibson, the daughter of a rich banker in Newcastle. He and his growing family lived in succession at several rustic residences in the Highlands in Ross-shire, Inverness, Nairn, and Moray and ultimately settled in the Laigh of Moray, within easy distance of mountain sport.

In 1853 a paralytic seizure deprived him of the use of his limbs on the left side of his body, and for the benefit of his health he removed to the south of England, although he never recovered the use of his limbs. He died at Woolston, Hampshire, on 22 July 1856, leaving his widow, three sons, and a daughter. His works are Short Sketches of the Wild Sports and Natural History of the Highlands (London, 1846, 2nd ed. 1848, 3rd ed. 1861); Tour in Sutherland (1849, 2nd ed., with recollections by Captain H. St. John, 1884); Notes of Natural History and Sport in Morayshire, with Memoir by C. Innes (1863, 2nd ed. 1884). They are written in a graphic style, and illustrated with engravings, many of them from clever pen-and-ink sketches of his own. His account of the stalking of the Muckle Hart of Benmore and was influential in the development of Scottish red deer stalking and has been described as a "classic for all time" among deer-stalkers.

== Works cited ==
- Edwards, Lionel; Wallace, Harold Frank (1927). Hunting and Stalking the Deer. London: Longmans.
- Biography, Oxford Dictionary of National Biography
