= Alexandre Ferdinand Parseval-Deschenes =

French admiral and senator (1790–1860)

Alexandre Ferdinand Parseval-Deschênes
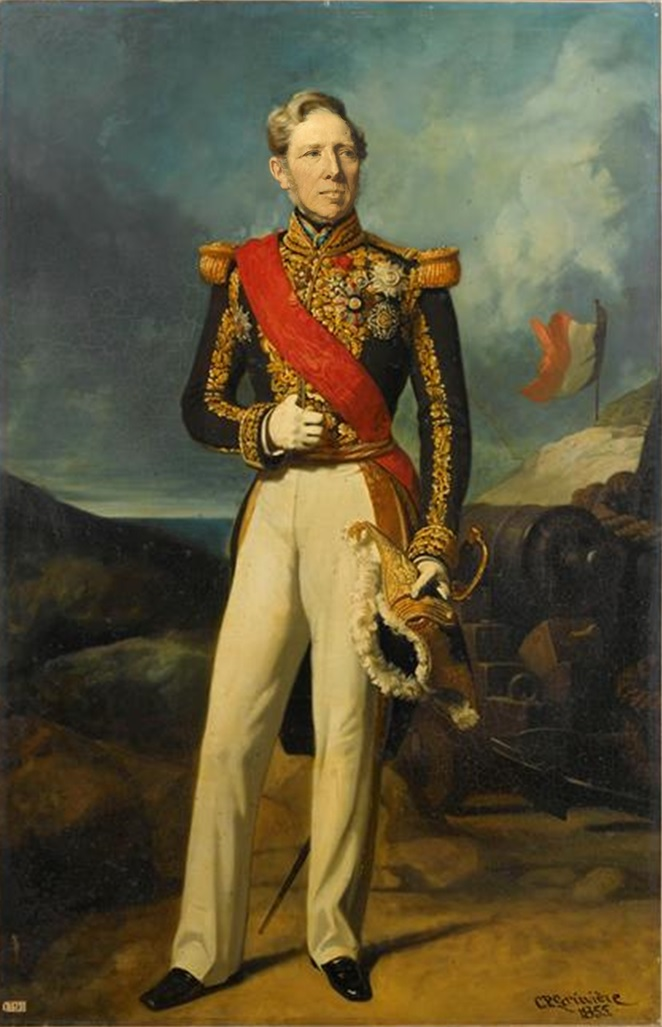
- Alexandre Ferdinand Parseval-Deschenes by Charles-Philippe Larivière, 1855 (musée du Château de Versailles)
- Born: 27 November 1790; Paris, France
- Died: 10 June 1860 (aged 69); Paris, France
- Burial place: Cimetière du Père-Lachaise
- Military career
- Allegiance: First French Empire; Bourbon Restoration (France) July Monarchy; French Second Republic; Second French Empire
- Branch: French Navy
- Service years: 1804–1860
- Rank: Admiral
- Conflicts: Pastry War; Crimean War
- Awards: Grand Cross of the Légion d'honneur
- Other work: Senator

Alexandre Ferdinand Parseval-Deschenes (27 November 1790 – 10 June 1860) was a French admiral and senator.

== Life ==
Born in Paris to an aristocratic family, Alexandre was the nephew of the mathematician Marc-Antoine Parseval and the Académicien François-Auguste Parseval-Grandmaison. He volunteered for the Navy in 1804 and participated in the recapture of Fort Le Diamant on Martinique, then fought at Trafalgar as an aspirant on board Bucentaure, the admiral's flagship. As an enseigne de vaisseau, Parseval-Deschenes participated in the 1815 hydrographic investigations of Brittany. In 1817 he took part in the expedition that retook Guyana for France, ending its occupation by Portugal, and then commanded the French naval station in that colony for two years.

In 1822, as lieutenant de vaisseau, Alexandre was awarded the Légion d'honneur for successfully rescuing the crew of the frigate Africaine, shipwrecked on the Newfoundland coast. He then commanded the frigate Iphigénie in the Mexico expedition participating in the blockade of Veracruz and bombardment of San Juan de Ulúa in 1838, then the occupation of Argentine island of Martin-Garcia in 1839.

Promoted to contre-amiral on 30 April 1840, Alexandre then served as major-general of the navy at Toulon, then Maritime Prefect at Cherbourg-en-Cotentin, before commanding the training squadron in the Mediterranean. He then rose to vice admiral on 15 July 1846, he next served as Maritime Prefect at Toulon then once again commander of the Mediterranean training squadron. He entered the Conseil de l'amirauté in 1851 and presided over the Board of Construction (Conseil des travaux). He was made a senator by Napoleon III on 26 November 1852. He then commanded France's Baltic fleet during the Crimean War, with which he bombarded the Russian fortress of Bomarsund and received its surrender on 16 August - as a reward he was promoted to admiral on the following 2 December. Admiral Parseval-Deschenes is buried at the Cimetière du Père-Lachaise and a late 19th-century aviso in the French Navy (launched in 1879 and decommissioned in 1898) was named after him.

== Decorations ==
- Grand Cross of the Légion d'honneur - 30 August 1854.
- Médaille Militaire - 1854.

== See also ==
- Politics of France
- Military history of France
