= Queen (1785 ship) =

Ship of the British East India Company (1785–1800

History

East India Company
- Name: Queen
- Namesake: Charlotte of Mecklenburg-Strelitz
- Owner: Voyages 1-2: Hugh Atkins; Voyages 3-4: Peter Douglas; Voyage 5: Moses Aga
- Builder: Randall, Rotherhithe
- Launched: November 1785
- Fate: Burned and exploded 9 July 1800

General characteristics
- Type: East Indiaman
- Tons burthen: 801, or 80136/94 (bm)
- Length: Overall:143 ft 9 in (43.82 m); Keel:116 ft 3 in (35.43 m)
- Beam: 36 ft 0 in (10.97 m)
- Depth of hold: 14 ft 9 in (4.50 m)
- Complement: 100
- Armament: 26 x 9 & 12-pounder guns

Queen was launched in 1785 and served the British East India Company as an East Indiaman. She had made four voyages to India and China for the Company and was on the initial leg of her fifth voyage when a fire on 9 July 1800 destroyed her at St. Salvador.

== Voyages ==
=== Voyage 1 (1786-1788) ===
Under Captain Peter Douglas, Queen sailed from The Downs on 20 Feb 1786, bound for Bombay, Bengal and China. She reached Madeira on 16 March, cleared the Cape, and on 1 July arrived at. Twenty-two days later Queen was at Bombay. From there she started around India, arriving at Tellicherry on 28 October and Kedgeree on 4 December. She then retraced her voyage, passing Saugor on 13 March 1787, stopping at Tellicherry on 25 April, and then on 8 May arriving at Bombay. From there she sailed for China, reaching Malacca on 25 August, and Whampoa anchorage on 2 October. For her journey home, she crossed the Second Bar on 31 January 1788. She reached St Helena on 12 June and anchored in The Downs on 25 August.

=== Voyage 2 (1790-1792) ===
For her second voyage, Douglas was still Queen's captain. She left The Downs on 5 April 1790, bound for Madras, Bengal, and Bombay, and 15 days later arrived at Madeira. She reached Madras on 5 September, Masulipatam on 25 September, and Culpee (Calcutta) on 1 November, where her cargo of 'Small's beer and porter' and 'Bells beer and pale ale' was advertised for sale in the Calcutta Gazette. She left Diamond Harbour (also Calcutta), on 26 December, stopping at Ingeli, a point on the Hooghli River, on 15 Jan 1791. From there she sailed to 2 Feb Madras, which she reached on 2 February, and then Cannanore on 23 March and Tellicherry two days later. She arrived at Anjengo on 11 April, stopped at Cochin on 24 April, and two days later was back at Tellicherry. On 13 May she arrived at Bombay. She then sailed all the way around India to Diamond Harbour, which she arrived at 25 September. For the homeward bound trip she was at Saugor on 15 November and reached the Cape on 15 Feb 1792. Queen arrived at St Helena on 6 March and anchored in The Downs on 17 May.

=== Voyage 3 (1793-1795) ===
For her third voyage, Queen was under the command of Captain Milliken Craig. As war with France had broken out, she sailed under a letter of marque that had been issued to Craig for her on 27 December 1793.

The British government held Queen at Portsmouth, together with a number of other Indiamen in anticipation of using them as transports for an attack on Île de France (Mauritius). It gave up the plan and released the vessels in May 1794. It paid £1,479 3s 4d for having delayed her departure by 71 days.

Queen left Portsmouth on 2 May, bound for Madras and Bengal, and reached Madras on 11 September. She sailed up India's east coast to Diamond Harbour, which she reached on 15 October. Her return voyage took her past Saugor on 30 Jan 1795 and to Madras again on 29 March. She arrived at St Helena on 17 August and the Downs of 25 November.

=== Voyage 4 (1796-1798) ===
Again under Craig's command, Queen left Portsmouth on 11 August 1796, bound for St Helena and Bencoolen. She then stopped at St Helena on 16 October and the Cape on 24 November. On 17 February 1797 she arrived at Madras. She then sailed directly to Bencoolen, which she reached on 8 May. From there she sailed to Diamond Harbour, reaching it on 10 October. She passed Saugor on 16 December on her way back to Bencoolen, which she= reached on 21 February 1798. She did not arrive back in Britain until almost a year later, on 9 February 1799.

=== Voyage 5 (1800 — loss) ===
Craig and Queen left Torbay on 3 May 1800 on her last, ill-fated voyage, to Madras and China.

== Loss ==
Queen put into Salvador, Bahia, to replenish her water. She was in company with the East Indiaman Kent, with which she had left Torbay in convoy. During the night of 8–9 July a fire broke out on Queen while most of her officers and passengers were ashore. Lookouts on Kent appear to have noticed the smoke before the crew of Queen did, and Kent sent boats and fire-fighting equipment, but the currents were too strong for them to be of much use.

The fire was discovered burning in the gun-room at 3 am, though no one had visited it after 8pm. The cause of the fire was attributed to a Portuguese gunboat which had come alongside Queen, ostensibly as an anti-smuggling measure. The Portuguese gunboat had a fire lit aboard, part of which the crew threw into the Queen's gun-room scuttle, starting the fire.

The fire raged out of control, but fortunately winds and currents pushed Queen out of the bay and so away from Kent. Queen blew up at 7 am.

Casualties on board Queen were heavy. An officer on Kent wrote a letter from Salvador a little more than a week later and reported that many aboard her had drowned when they leaped into the water. He estimated that she had lost six passengers, some 30 troops (of an unspecified number that she was carrying to India) and who could not get to the hatchways in time, and 70 of her crew. Because the fire broke out during the night and boats could not be launched, all the survivors, including five ladies, lost everything but whatever clothes they had on.

The EIC put the value of the cargo that it had lost on Queen at £30,421.

== Aftermath ==
Kent remained at Salvador for more than a week and then loaded the surviving troops and passengers to take them on to Calcutta. (It is not clear whether any of Queen's officers and crew also went.) Kent reportedly took on some 300 people in all. She therefore had some 440 persons on board.

On 7 October, off the Sand Heads (near the mouth of the Ganges River, Kent encountered the French privateer brig Confiance, of 18 guns and 150 men, under the command of Robert Surcouf. Surcouf managed to board his larger opponent and seize control of the Kent. The British had 14 men killed, including her captain, and 44 wounded, while the French suffered five men killed and ten wounded. Surcouf released the passengers on a merchantman that he stopped a few days later.
