= Claude Carra Saint-Cyr =

French general and diplomat (1760–1834)

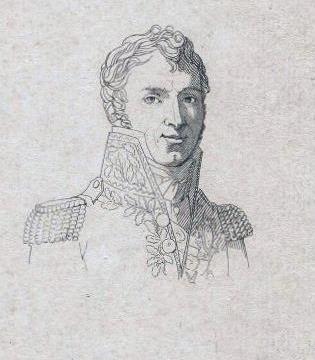
- General Count Carra Saint-Cyr.

1st Commandant of French Guiana
- In office 1814–1819
- Preceded by: Manuel Marques (Portuguese rule)
- Succeeded by: Pierre Clément de Laussat
- Monarch: Louis XVIII

Personal details
- Born: Jean-François Claude Carra de Saint-Cyr; 28 July 1760 Lyon, France
- Died: 5 January 1834 (aged 73) Vailly-sur-Aisne, France
- Civilian awards: Baron of the Empire, Count

Military service
- Allegiance: Kingdom of France; France; Kingdom of France
- Branch/service: Infantry
- Years of service: 1774–1814
- Rank: General of Division
- Battles/wars: American Revolutionary War; French Revolutionary Wars; Napoleonic Wars
- Military awards: Legion of Honour; Order of St. Louis Chevalier

For the French milliner, see Claude Saint-Cyr, For the Marshal of France see Laurent de Gouvion Saint-Cyr

Claude Carra Saint-Cyr (French pronunciation: [klod kaʁa sɛ̃ siʁ]; born 28 July 1760 in Lyon, died 5 January 1834 in Vailly-sur-Aisne) was a French general and diplomat, noted for his participation to the French Revolutionary and Napoleonic Wars.

Carra Saint-Cyr entered active service in 1774, with the Bourdonnais regiment, and was a part of the French expeditionary corps during the American War of Independence. He was a captain and held a position in the military commissariat. With the outbreak of the Wars of the Revolution, Carra Saint-Cyr resumed active duty, serving in the army of the West as aide-de-camp to general Jean-Baptiste Annibal Aubert du Bayet, subsequently accompanying Aubert du Bayet to Constantinople, where the latter was appointed ambassador to the Ottoman Empire. Carra Saint-Cyr then served as consul in Wallachia, before returning to France, in 1798. He was at Marengo in 1800 and became a general of division in 1803. Named governor of Magdeburg in 1806, he was created baron of the Empire two years later and in 1809 he held the command of an infantry division during the War of the Fifth Coalition, playing an important role at the battle of Aspern-Essling. He was named governor of Dresden and in 1813 governor of Hamburg and in this capacity evacuated the city with his troops and was defeated on the Elbe. For this, he was disgraced, but general Dominique Vandamme still gave him the command of a division, with the mission of defending the Ems river. With the Bourbon Restoration of 1814, Carra Saint-Cyr was created count and named governor of French Guiana, a position that he would hold from 1814 to 1819. His name appears on the Arc de Triomphe in Paris.

== Sources ==
- Fierro, Alfredo; Palluel-Guillard, André; Tulard, Jean - "Histoire et Dictionnaire du Consulat et de l'Empire”, Éditions Robert Laffont, ISBN 2-221-05858-5
