= Confiance (1797 ship) =

French privateer corvette of Robert Surcouf

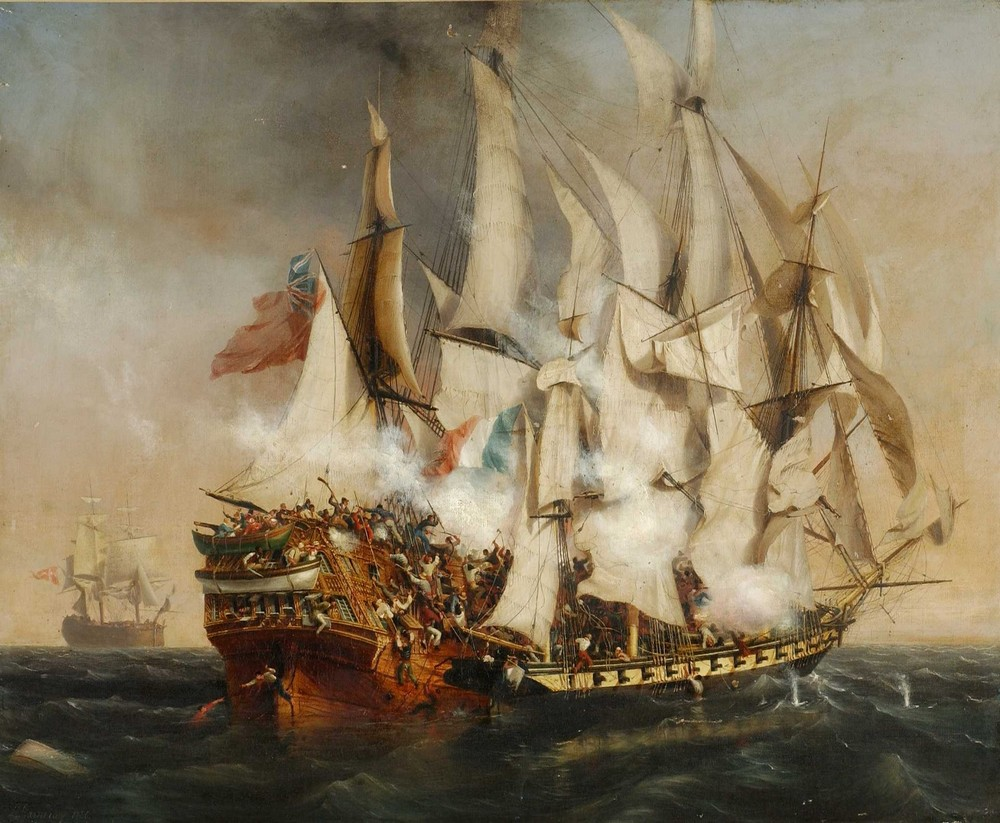
- Capture of Kent by Confiance. Painting by Ambroise Louis Garneray.

History

France
- Name: Confiance
- Builder: Bordeaux
- Launched: November 1797
- Commissioned: May 1799
- Captured: 4 June 1805

United Kingdom
- Name: HMS Confiance
- Acquired: 4 June 1805 by capture
- Honours and awards: Naval General Service Medal with clasps; "13 Feb. Boat Service 1808"; "Confiance 14 Jany. 1809"
- Fate: Sold in 1810

General characteristics
- Type: Corvette
- Displacement: 365 tons (French); 700 tons (French) fully loaded
- Tons burthen: 49159/94 (bm)
- Length: Overall:35.86 m (117.7 ft); Keel:30.6 m (100 ft)
- Beam: 9.53 m (31.3 ft)
- Draught: 4.3 m (14 ft)
- Crew: Pre-1800 150; 1800: 23 officers and 190 men; British service:140
- Armament: Pierced for 24 guns; May 1799-March 1800: 18 × 8-pounder long guns + 4 swivel guns; May 1800: 6 × 8-pounder long guns + 16 × 6-pounder guns + 2 × 38-pounder obusiers de vaisseau; HMS: 22 × 18-pounder carronades + 2 × 6-pounder guns

Confiance, launched in 1797, was a privateer corvette from Bordeaux, famous for being Robert Surcouf's ship during the capture of the British East India Company's East Indiaman Kent. Confiance had captured a number of ships through the years before the British Royal Navy captured her in 1805, taking her into service under her existing name. The Royal Navy sold her in 1810, by which time she had taken part in two notable actions in British service. Confiance then sailed as a merchantman, until 1816.

== French service ==
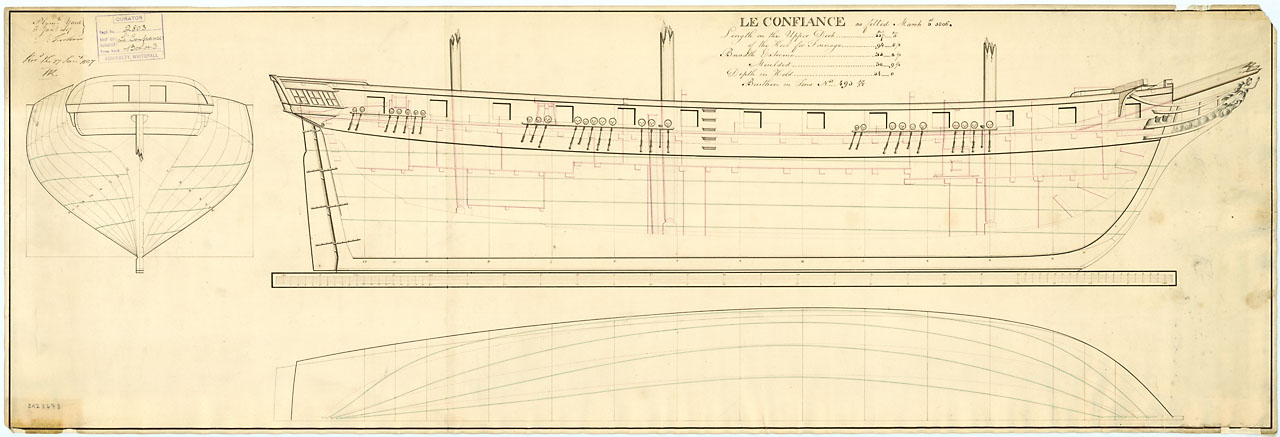
Confiance as built in 1797

Completed in Bordeaux in November 1797, Confiance capsized at her launch and had to be refloated. On 3 February 1799 Confiance captured Echo as Echo was sailing from the Cape of Good Hope for London. Confiance sent Echo to France. 1799 Confiance was commissioned under Aurnaud Taudin in May 1799.

On 24 December 1799, Confiance encountered the American ship Atlantic and the British East India Company "extra ship" (chartered ship) Eliza Ann near the Sandheads in the Bay of Bengal. The engagement was inconclusive both that day and the next morning. Confiance broke off the action and sailed away early on Christmas morning.

In May 1800, Confiance was recommissioned in Île de France and her command was awarded to Robert Surcouf, with a complement of 23 officers and 190 men, and an armament of six 8-pounder long guns, sixteen 6-pounders and two 36-pounder obusiers de vaisseau.

On 15 June she captured American ship "Altenamak" (or Alknomak) at the entrance to the Sunda Strait.

On 7 October, she encountered the East Indiaman Kent and captured her after a fierce battle; an 81-man prize crew under Joachim Drieux brought Kent to Île de France (Mauritius), where she was sold for 30,900 piastres.

In 1801, Confiance had her crew reduced to 89 men and sailed en aventurier to La Rochelle, loaded with colonial goods for her return to France. According to one source Confiance sailed "à l'aventure"; she was a letter of marque, a vessel that was primarily a merchantman, but with the legal authorization to attack targets of opportunity. On the journey, Surcouf still managed to capture a number of ships, notably the Portuguese Ebre, with eighteen 12-pounder carronades and a 60-man crew; he released her against a ransom of 10,000 piastres and after exchanging her main mast for that of Confiance. After her arrival in France, Confiance was commissioned as a merchantman under Paul Castanet from May 1802.

== Capture ==
By late 1803, she served in Muros, Spain, under Captain Roque and later under Papin. On 4 June 1805, HMS Loire attacked the town of Muros, in Spain, and captured Confiance, as well as her consort Bélier. Loire had six men wounded in the landing party that captured a fort, a battery, and the two vessels, and nine men wounded on Loire by fire from the batteries before the British could capture them. The Spaniards lost 12 men killed, including the commander of the fort and Confiance's 2nd captain, and 30 men wounded, including most of Confiance's officers. Captain Frederick Maitland, of Loire, reported that Confiance was a "very fit Ship for His Majesty's Service; is reckoned to sail excessively fast; was to have gone to Sea in a few Days, bound to India, with a Complement of 300 men". Maitland burnt Bélier, which he described as also fitting for sea, "supposed to be destined to cruise to Westward of Cape Clear."

The action led to promotion to Commander for Lieutenant James Lucas Yeo, who commanded the cutting out party. Lloyd's Patriotic Fund awarded a sword worth 150 guineas to Maitland, and two swords, each worth 50 guineas, to lieutenants Yeo and Mallock.

== HMS Confiance ==
The British commissioned Confiance into the Royal Navy in June as an 18-gun sloop under the newly promoted Commander James Yeo, and for the Channel. (Confiance kept her status as a sloop until 1807, when the Admiralty re-rated her as a sixth rate. She remained at Plymouth from 19 June to 14 March 1806 undergoing fitting out. (Note: The British measured Confiance and reconstituted her plans. These were published in the first edition of Bateaux-Bois in February 1998, and then later in David Lyon's Sailing Navy List (p.275))

Confiance shared with Hero, Iris, and Révolutionnaire in the proceeds from the recapture on 11 January 1807 of the schooner Monarch.

On 18 August, as Confiance was sailing to Porto, Yeo received information that the Reitrada, a small Spanish privateer lugger that had been active along the coast of Portugal, was anchored at La Guardia. Yeo sent in a cutting out party in Confiance's boats. They captured the lugger, which was armed with one 12 and two 4-pounder guns, and had a crew of 30 men. The Spaniards had one man killed, several wounded, and the rest of the crew jumped overboard. The privateer had sheltered under the guns of two forts, which fired on the boats as they came in. One fort was armed with four 24-pounder guns and the other with six 18-pounder guns; there were also 150 troops. Despite the Spaniards' fire, the British sustained no casualties.

Confiance sailed to Portugal on 16 January 1808. The French had captured Lisbon and the Royal Navy was maintaining a blockade in the Tagus where the onset of the Anglo-Russian War had trapped a squadron of Russian ships under the command of Vice-Admiral Dmitry Senyavin. Confiance was off the Tagus when on 13 February she sent her cutter and jolly boat, with 15 men under the command of Master's Mate R. Trist, to row picket because of rumours that Senyavin was about to leave. Trist observed a French gun-vessel anchored under the guns of Fort San Pedro, between Fort Belem and Fort Julian. He immediately attacked, capturing Gunboat #1, which was armed with one 24-pounder gun and two 6-pounder carronades. She had 100 stands of arms aboard, and a crew of 50 men under the command of ensign de vaisseau Gandolphe. The British suffered no casualties; the French had three men killed and nine wounded. Trist, who had passed his exams for Lieutenant a year earlier, received promotion to that rank for his feat. In 1847 the Admiralty issued the Naval General Service Medal (NGSM) with clasp "13 Feb. Boat Service 1808" to all surviving claimants from the action.

Confiance next sailed to Rio de Janeiro, Brazil. On 14 January 1809 Confiance took part in the capture of Cayenne, French Guiana.

Yeo received permission from the commander-in-chief of the Royal Navy's Brazil station, Admiral Sir Sidney Smith to mount an operation against the French. Yeo took Confiance, two armed Portuguese brigs, an unarmed Portuguese brig, a Portuguese cutter, and 4-500 Portuguese soldiers, and sailed to Oyapoc, in French Guiana, which they captured on 8 December 1808. (Note: The Portuguese vessels were Voador (24 guns), Vingança (18 guns), Infanta Don Pedro, and Leio.) A week later they captured Appruagoc (or Appruague).

Emboldened by the ease of their victories, Yeo and the Portuguese commander then decided to attack Cayenne. They captured three forts and defeated the French forces under the command of Victor Hugues, the French governor. British casualties were only one man killed and 23 men wounded.

On 13 January 1809, while Yeo was on shore with three-quarters of Confiance's crew, seamen and marines, the French frigate Topaze approached Cayenne. She was carrying flour and was under orders to avoid combat, but the British did not know that. Midshipman G. Yeo, Yeo's younger brother, another midshipman, the remaining 25 men of the crew, and 20 local Negroes that the two midshipmen induced to join them, set sail towards Topaze. Topaze, judging from the sloop's boldness that she had company that would be forthcoming, turned away. A few days later HMS Cleopatra captured Topaze.

King George knighted James Yeo in 1810 for his victory. In 1847 the Admiralty awarded the Naval General Service Medal with clasp "Confiance 14 Jany. 1809" to all surviving claimants from the operation.

== Fate ==
The Principal Officers and Commissioners of His Majesty's Navy offered the "Confiance Sloop, 560 [Tons Burthen]", lying at Deptford, for sale on 22 December 1810. She sold on that day. She appears to have sailed as a merchantman at least until 1816.
