= Lord's Wood =

Lord's Wood may refer to:

- Lord's Wood, Dittisham, Devon, England
- Lord's Wood, Pensford, Somerset, England

== See also ==
- Lord Wood (disambiguation)
