= Richard McDonald Caunter =

English Church of England clergyman and writer

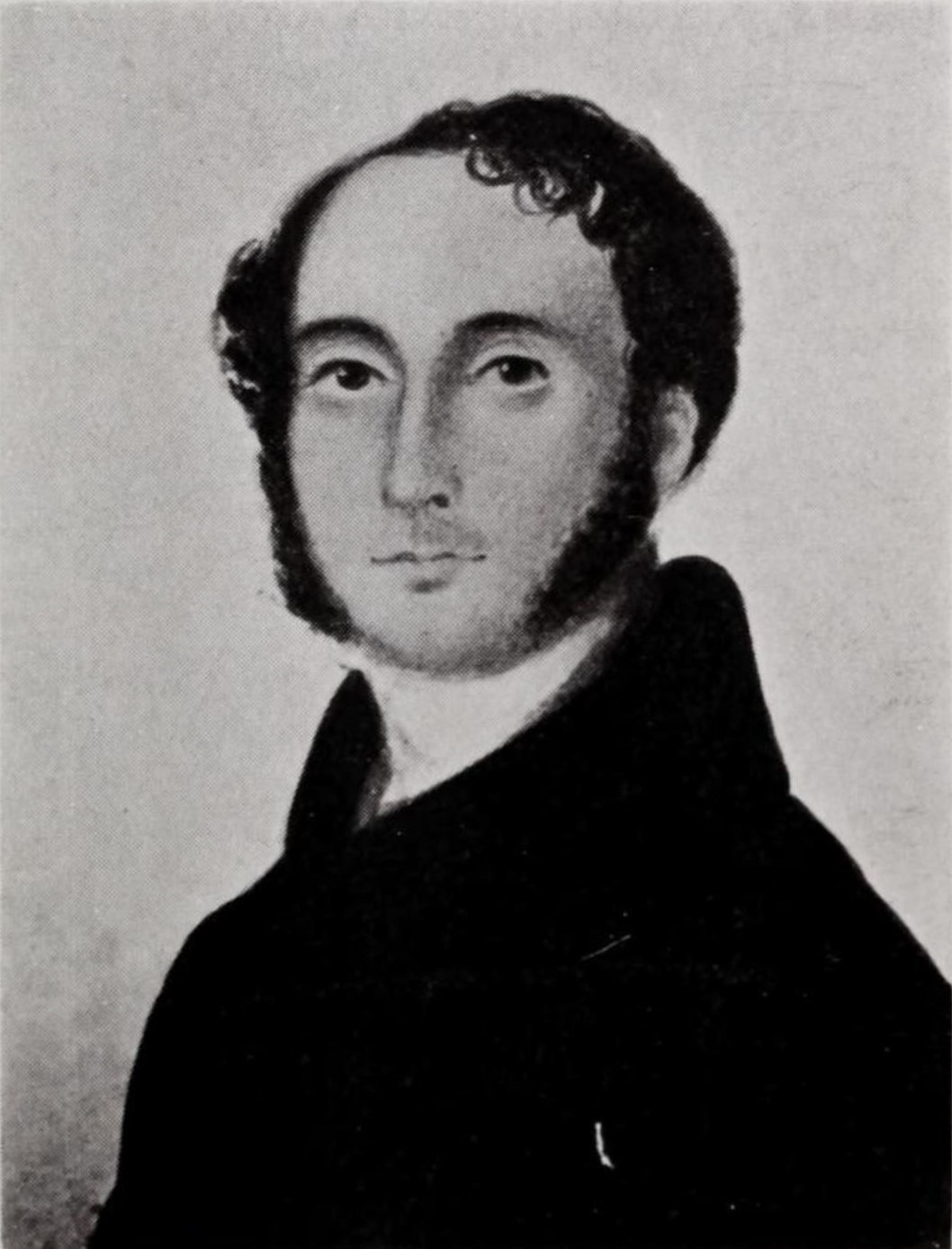
- Born: 22 March 1798; Prince of Wales Island, British India
- Died: 10 March 1879 (aged 80); Brighton, Sussex, United Kingdom
- Spouse: Ann Harrison

Richard McDonald Caunter (22 March 1798 – 10 March 1879) was an English clergyman and the presumed author of a play and poetry collection, Attila, a Tragedy; and Other Poems (1832). Following a brief career as an ensign in the army, Caunter took holy orders and was a parish priest of various parishes in southern England.

== Life ==
Richard McDonald was born at Government House on Prince of Wales Island (today Penang, Malaysia), where his father George Caunter was chief magistrate and, at various times, acting superintendent in the absence of superintendent Forbes Ross MacDonald. Richard's father came from the South Devon village of Staverton and his mother, Harriett Georgina, née Hutchings, from Dittisham, also in South Devon. She died giving birth to Richard and his twin sister, Sarah Sparke Caunter.

When about four years old, the two children were sent to live with their uncle, the Reverend Robert Sparke Hutchings of Dittisham Rectory. In 1811 their father died at sea. Richard was schooled at Plympton and at age 16 became an ensign in the 16th Lancers, being sent to India. He eventually sold out his commission and in 1820 obtained a scholarship at Sidney Sussex College, Cambridge, studying civil law and obtaining a Bachelor of Laws degree in 1829. He was ordained a deacon and priest in London in 1824 and in the same year was Curate at Bradwell-on-Sea. He spent 1824 to 1829 as Chaplain to the Governor of Mauritius, Sir Galbraith Lowry Cole (from 1828 Sir Charles Colville), and also spent time in Cape Town.

In 1831 Caunter was morning preacher at St George's, Hanover Square in London and also preached in St Paul's Cathedral. Until the end of 1832 he had the temporary ministry of St Peter's Chapel in Marylebone. At different times he held the curacy of the parishes of Forest Row, Frant and Pulborough in Sussex and Tunbridge Wells in Kent. In the 1830s he was domestic chaplain to the Earl De La Warr. In 1840, the year he became Curate of Amberley in Sussex, he married Ann Harrison, which is commemorated in a stained-glass window in the parish church. Caunter was subsequently Curate at Highclere, Hampshire (c. 1841-52), Hanwell, Oxfordshire and Drayton, Oxfordshire (1861-1871). He died in Patcham in the city of Brighton, his last place of residence, and was buried there.

Caunter was a member of the Royal Asiatic Society of Great Britain and Ireland. According to F. Lyde Caunter in Caunter Family History (1930), he "used to remark on the fact that he had held the Queen of England in his arms", then adding: "as an infant."

== Works ==
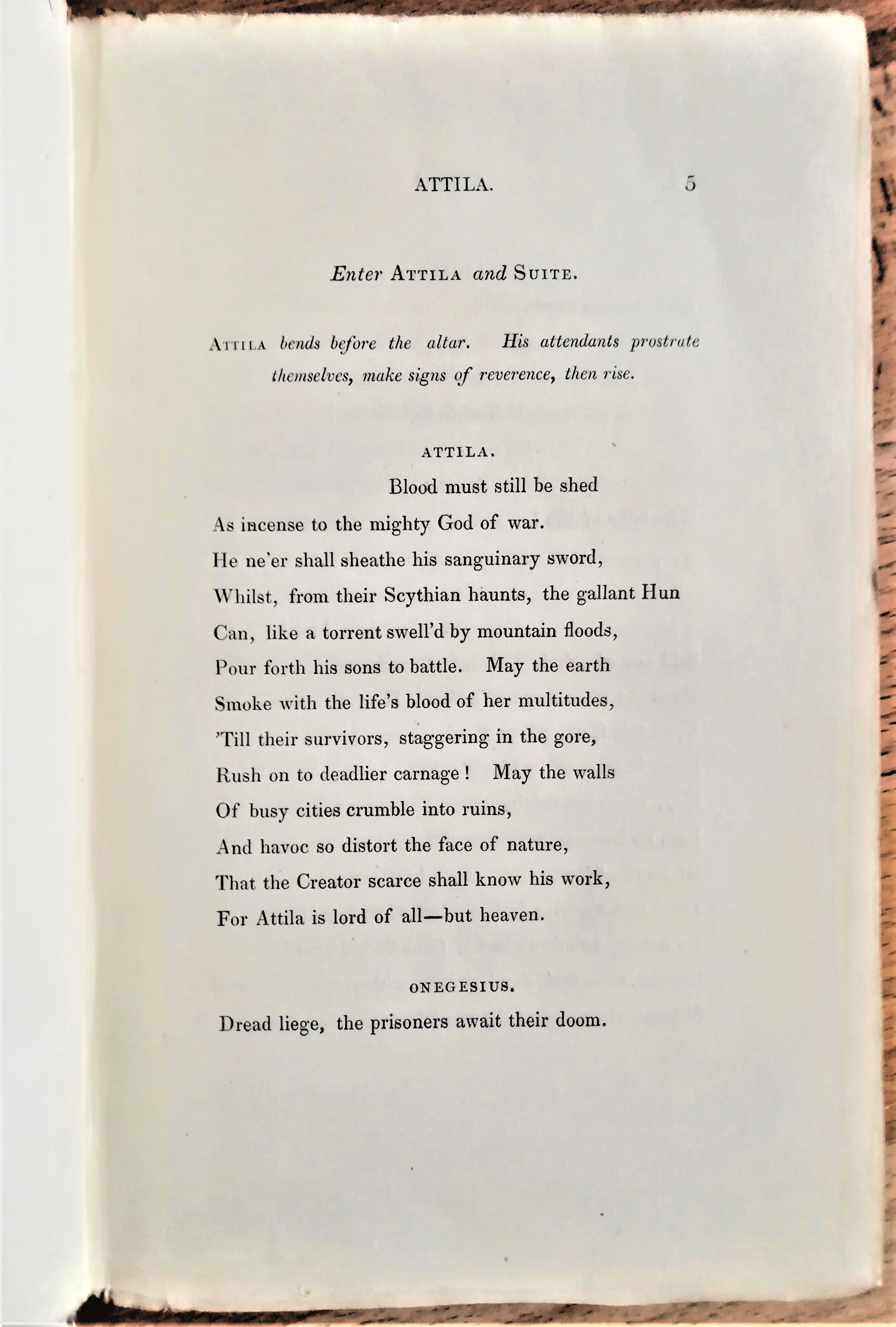
A page from Caunter's play Attila (1832)

In 1832 a volume of anonymous authorship combining a play and a collection of poetry was published, Attila, a Tragedy; and Other Poems (London, T. and W. Boone). The play, written in iambic pentameter, describes an episode from the life of Attila, King of the Huns, as he prepares to lay siege to Constantinople. The play makes Bleda, Attila's brother, one of the king's principal foes. The poetry section includes several long poems, among them a poem about Cupid and Psyche after Apuleius, and works written in India and aboard ship off the Cape of Good Hope.

=== Authorship ===
The Royal Asiatic Society of Great Britain and Ireland attributed the book to Richard McDonald Caunter shortly after its publication. The attribution was made in a list of books donated to the Society, and has since been universally followed. However, at least several of the poems had appeared in various magazines and annuals, in versions differing to a greater or lesser extent from those in the book, as being from the hand of the clergyman and writer John Hobart Caunter, Richard's brother. The long poem about Cupid and Psyche, 'The Trial', had appeared in Hobart's volume of verse The Cadet (1814). 'On the Efficacy of Religion. Addressed to a Young Friend' had appeared in The Iris: A Literary and Religious Offering (1830). 'Human Life' had been printed in Lyra Britannica (1830). A shorter version of 'The Exile's Return' had appeared in The Remembrance (1831) (and elaborates a theme similar to Hobart's The Cadet). 'Ode to Winter' had appeared in The Juvenile Forget Me Not (1830). 'To a Friend, Who Had Sent Me His Likeness in Shade' and 'Song' had both appeared in The Juvenile Keepsake (1830). 'The Rescue' is stated in Attila to have been inspired by a picture, 'The Death of the Dove', by Thomas Stewardson, which Hobart had earlier written a poem about. 'A Sister's Lamentation' appeared in Ackermann's Juvenile Forget Me Not (1830).

Whereas Hobart was a prolific author, no literary work other than Attila, a Tragedy; and Other Poems has been ascribed to Richard. However, after the publication of the first two volumes of Hobart's travel accounts of India, The Oriental Annual, it was rumoured that Hobart had merely been the arranger of materials collected by Richard. This allegation was rejected by Hobart as well as by a reviewer in The Spectator.

=== Critical reception ===
In reviewing the volume, The Metropolitan wrote: "There is a want of force to aid lofty flights and passionate outbreakings visible throughout; and yet, in the gentle and descriptive, there is beauty and pure poetry. The taste of the day is unfortunately against every thing that does not astonish". The Weekly Visitor considered that "The Author of Attila is a man who has seen much, and has brought to aid him, in writing the above, talents of a high character, much observation, and keen insight into the characters of men, and vigorous powers of imagination." The Monthly Review stated: "we do not think the powers of the poet before us adequate to the very serious demands which the concoction of a tragic drama, out of the incidents of Attila's life, prefers. The minor poems possess some merit".

The Morning Post lamented that the author appeared not to have intended the play for production on the stage, and wrote: "In the conduct of the story the interest of the reader is constantly sustained, and the character of Cerca is especially powerful in exciting the sympathy of some of the best feelings in our nature. The effort of the author is of course thrown into the "splendid barbarian" with all his force, and unquestionably with a high degree of success."

Old England similarly rued the author's evident lack of hope that the work would be acted on the stage, and went on to write: "We do not think he has been happy in the choice of his subject; for although the springs of human feeling and action may remain eternally the same, yet they are so refined and modified by the influence of civilization, that the heart so softened will no longer instinctively sympathise with the rude impulses of savage life. [...] it is a different thing with the treatment of his subject. In touching the chords of nature even upon her ruder instruments he has shewn a hand capable of "discoursing most exquisite music." [...] Appended to the tragedy are some very pleasing poems of a miscellaneous kind, many of them proving that the author of Attila shines in lyric amatory verse, and that the pathetic is his forte."

In the view of The Athenæum, the author lacked "the rough, passionate energy necessary for such [dramatic] compositions. He has a readier talent for humbler themes. Of the smaller poems we think more favourably than of the tragic portion of the volume; and though some of the songs, amid the liquid flow of their lines, can pretend to no originality of thought, it is otherwise with the little poem on 'Cities,' in which there is a spirit of observation and satire [...] This is the age of prose; and we are afraid that the author of 'Attila' is not poet enough to call back the public feeling to the allurements of the Muse. The days of steam-engines and spinning-jennies are come: there is a windmill for the manufacture of tapes and bobbins on Parnassus; and Helicon drives machinery which makes calico at three halfpence a yard."

=== Sermons ===
A number of Richard McDonald Caunter's sermons were published, including two sermons he preached during the passage from Mauritius to England in 1829 and a sermon preached on the opening of Trinity Chapel, Forest Row (London, T. and W. Boone, 1836). Also attributed to him is Bazaar ballad : Air "Povera nanna pensierosa." (1835), held in the British Library.

== Family ==
Caunter's wife Ann Harrison was born in Masham, Yorkshire in 1813 and died in Warwick, Warwickshire in 1883. The couple had nine children. Their eldest son, Richard Hanley Caunter (1841-1922), was Keeper in the Printed Books Department at the British Museum and an expert in Spanish. Their granddaughter Rachel Estelle Berridge, the Lady Clonmell (1871-1952), married Rupert Charles Scott, 7th Earl of Clonmell and was a stage actress before her marriage.

Two older brothers of Richard McDonald Caunter were active in the London cultural scene in and around the 1830s. George Henry Caunter (1791-1843) was a music critic; John Hobart Caunter (c.1793-1851) was a clergyman and a writer of both fiction and non-fiction.
