= Bestel =

Bestel is a German language surname. It stems from the male given name Sebastian – and may refer to:

- Antoine Bestel (1766–1852), French lawyer and colonial politician
- Zoë Bestel (1997), Scottish singer-songwriter
