= The Athenaeum (British magazine) =

British literary magazine (1828–1921)

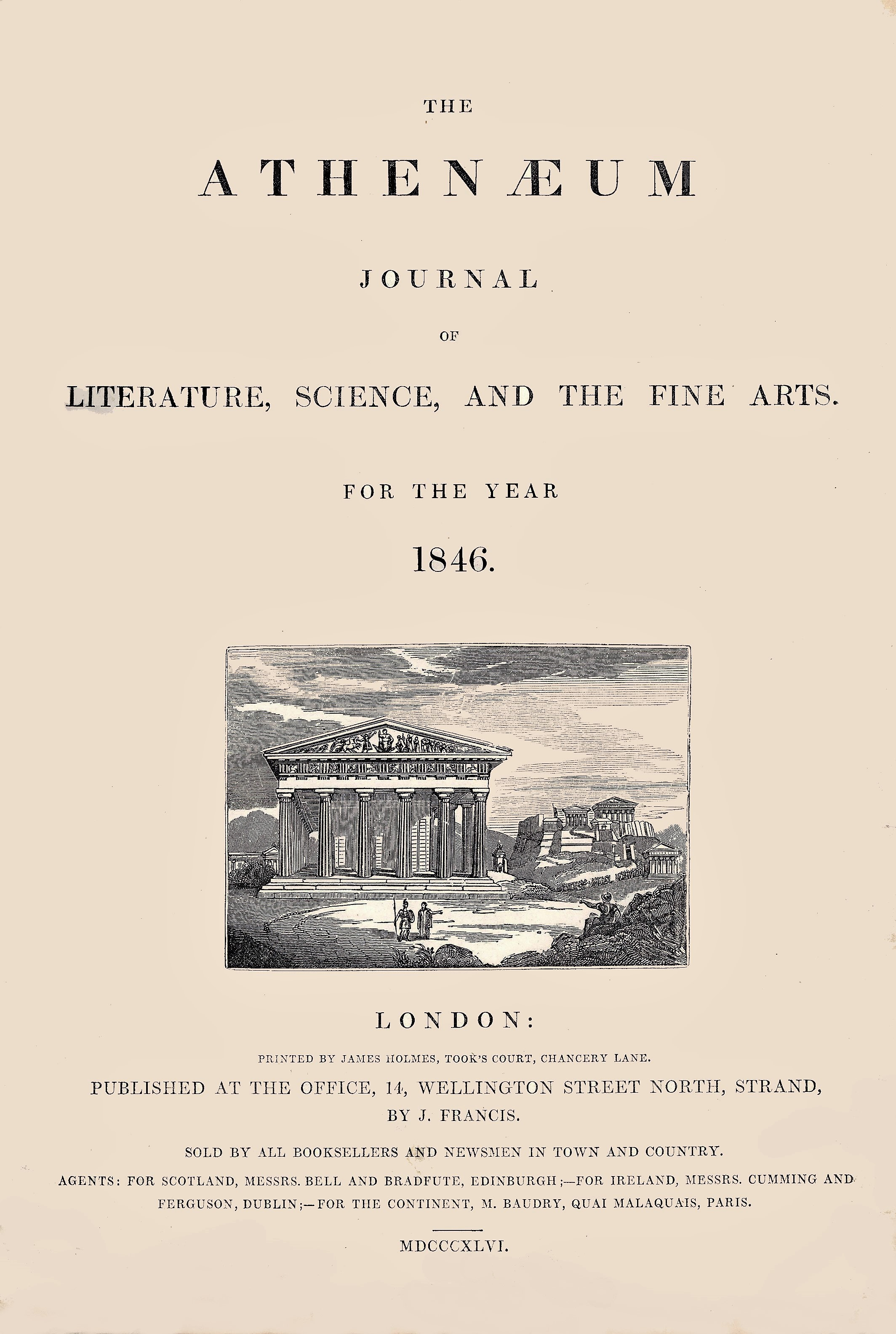
- The cover of the 1846 volume of The Athenæum
- Categories: Literary journal
- Frequency: Weekly
- Country: United Kingdom
- Based in: London
- Language: English

The Athenæum was a British literary magazine published in London, England, from 1828 to 1921. It absorbed The Literary Chronicle and Weekly Review (1819–1828) and was published as The Athenæum and Literary Chronicle for the first few volumes. In 1921 it merged with The Nation to form The Nation and the Athenaeum.

== Foundation ==
Initiated in 1828 by James Silk Buckingham, it was sold within a few weeks to Frederick Maurice and John Sterling, who failed to make it profitable. In 1829, Charles Wentworth Dilke became part proprietor and editor; he greatly extended the influence of the magazine. In 1846, he resigned the editorship and assumed that of the Daily News of London, but contributed a series of notable articles to the Athenaeum. The poet and critic Thomas Kibble Hervey succeeded Dilke as editor and served from 1846 until his resignation due to ill health in 1853. Historian and traveller William Hepworth Dixon succeeded Hervey in 1853, and remained editor until 1869.

== Contributors ==
George Darley was a staff critic during the early years, and Gerald Massey contributed many literary reviews – mainly on poetry – during the period 1858 to 1868. George Henry Caunter was one of the principal early contributors, writing reviews of French-language books. His brother John Hobart Caunter also contributed reviews. H. F. Chorley covered musical topics from 1830 until 1868, starting well before the general emergence of regular journalistic music criticism in the mid 1840s. Theodore Watts-Dunton contributed regularly as the principal critic of poetry from 1875 until 1898. Frederic George Stephens was art editor from 1860 until 1901, when he was replaced by Roger Fry because of his unfashionable disapproval of Impressionism; Stephens continued to contribute book reviews and obituaries until 1904. Arthur Symons joined the staff in 1891.

Editor from 1871 to 1900 was Norman MacColl. During the 19th century, the Athenaeum received contributions from Lord Kelvin. During the early 20th century, its contributors included Max Beerbohm, Edmund Blunden, T. S. Eliot, Robert Graves, Thomas Hardy, Aldous Huxley, Julian Huxley, Katherine Mansfield, George Santayana, Edith Sitwell and Virginia Woolf.

From 1849 to 1880, Geraldine Jewsbury contributed more than 2300 reviews. She was one of few women who reviewed for the Athenaeum and started submitting her reviews regularly by 1854. She rated highly novels that showed character morality and were also entertaining. She criticized the "fallen woman" theme, which was common in Victorian literature. During the second half of the 1850s, Jewsbury was entrusted with editing the "New Novels" section.. During the last decades of the nineteenth century, under MacColl a significant number of women, often authors themselves, contributed reviews to the weekly after being invited by the editor because of their expertise. Vernon Lee, Emilia Dilke, Augusta Webster, and Mathilde Blind are some of the prominent women who contributed on a regular basis (Cf Demoor).

== Legacy ==
A letter from J. S. Cotton, printed during 1905, definitively tells of the first-ever reference to the playing of a match of cricket in India.

In 1921, with decreasing circulation, the Athenaeum was incorporated into its younger competitor: the Nation, becoming The Nation and Athenaeum. In 1931, this successor publication merged with the New Statesman, to form the New Statesman and Nation, eliminating the name Athenaeum after 97 years.

== Folklore ==
In August 1846 William Thoms, writing as “Ambrose Merton”, launched The Athenaeum’s folklore correspondence by proposing “a good Saxon compound, Folk-Lore, the Lore of the People” and inviting readers to submit “manners, customs, observances, superstitions, ballads, proverbs, &c.” as survivals of “Popular Antiquities” worth preserving. Stephen Miller describes these “FOLKLORE” columns as an early public forum for an emerging discipline and a precursor to Thoms’s later editorial work (notably Notes and Queries). The feature appeared intermittently between 1846 and 1849, running to thirty-five columns and eighty-seven separate contributions; after a strong start in 1846, publication declined sharply. In 1847 Thoms attempted to sustain momentum with nine instalments of ‘The Folk-Lore of Shakespeare’. Most contributions were signed only with initials or ciphers, so few contributors can be securely identified.

== Collections ==
University College London holds letters from James Smith to Hepworth Dixon, editor of The Athenaeum, arguing against Augustus de Morgan's theory on the quadrature of the circle.
