= Edward Ellicott =

English naval officer during the French Revolutionary Wars and Napoleonic Wars

Rear-Admiral Edward Ellicott
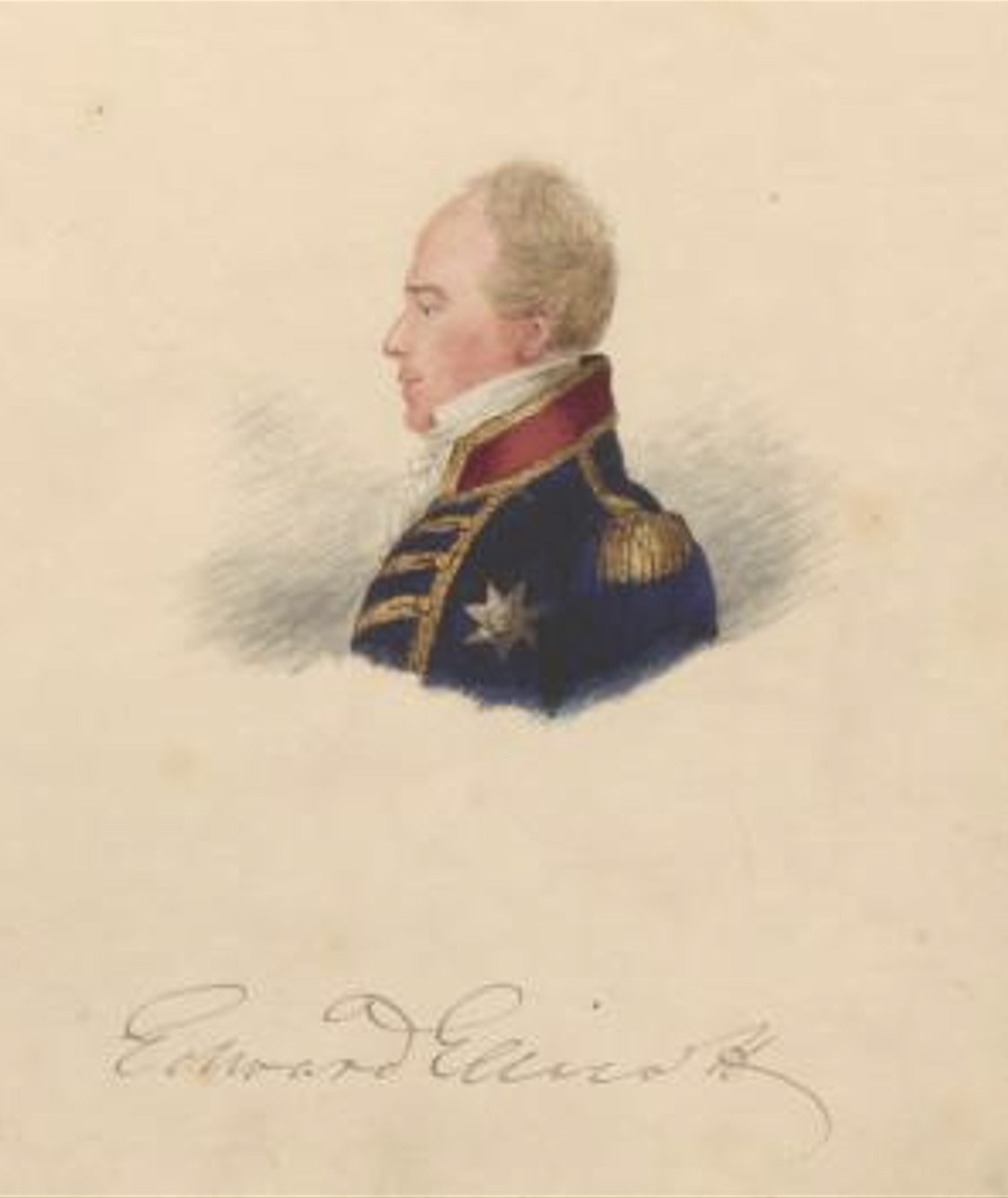
- Born: Edward Ellicott; 29 May 1768 likely Cullompton, Devon, England
- Died: 24 January 1847 (aged 78); Alcombe, Somerset, England
- Occupation: naval officer
- Spouse: Ann Prudence Starey
- Children: 1

Edward Ellicott (29 May 1768 – 24 January 1847) was an English naval officer who attained the rank of rear-admiral and was active in the French Revolutionary Wars and Napoleonic Wars.

== Career ==
Ellicott entered the Royal Navy in 1781 as first-class volunteer, serving on board the Mackworth in the Channel Fleet. He became a midshipman in 1783, serving on a number of ships, and was promoted to acting lieutenant in 1793. In that year he commanded the cutter Penelope and in the following he was promoted to lieutenant in the Eurydice under Captain Francis Cole. He accompanied Cole into the frigate Révolutionnaire as first lieutenant and participated in the capture of the French frigate Unité on 13 April 1796. Under instruction from Sir Edward Pellew, Ellicott commanded the captured vessel to England. Cole cited him "for his very particular attention in keeping sight of the chase, and for his steady and manly conduct when close engaged."

In February 1797, under Lord Bridport, Ellicott assisted at the victory off Cape St. Vincent, Portugal. He was lauded for his intrepid conduct during the mutiny in the Channel Fleet that same year. In June he assumed the rank of commander. While on board the Perseus he was severely wounded in an engagement. In 1801 he served under Nelson in the latter's failed attempt to destroy a French flotilla in the port of Boulogne. Ellicott was continually in service under leading admirals, including John MacBride, Sir Richard Strachan and George Palmer.

In 1804, Ellicott was posted to the North Sea, taking charge of the bomb vessel Explosion. On 10 September 1807, while under his command, the Explosion was wrecked off the coast of Heligoland. A court-martial found the loss of the ship to have been caused by the ignorance of the pilot, acquitting Ellicott but recommending that he not "place such unlimited confidence in the abilities of his pilots in future." Immediately afterwards he was appointed to command the frigate Hebe, assisting at the bombardment of Copenhagen, finding himself in a hurricane while in port at Curaçao, and protecting convoys between Orkney and Sweden. For his eminent services in the Baltic, the King of Sweden decorated him with the order of the Knight of the Sword of Sweden. He obtained his post-captaincy in 1812 during his command of the Hebe, and in 1846 was promoted to the rank of retired rear admiral. Upon retirement, he drew a pension from the Navy as a Greenwich out-pensioner.

Ellicott lived for many years in Alcombe, Somerset, and died there in 1847 shortly after retiring. He was buried in the churchyard of the Priory Church of St George, Dunster.

== Family ==
Edward Ellicott was baptised in Cullompton, Devon, the son of Robert Ellicott. At the age of 53, he married the London-born Ann Prudence Starey (1788–1865) in Croydon on 1 August 1821. From about the age of four, Ann’s family home was Croydon Palace where her father Samuel had established a bleaching business. As the oldest daughter, Ann likely helped run the household so her mother Elizabeth and two elder brothers could run the business following the death of their father on 28 October 1809.

Edward and Ann had an only daughter, Elizabeth (1822–1888), who after her father's death wrote the manuscript Some Events in the life of the late Rear Adml Ellicott, as well as writing An illustrated history of the county of Somerset. His sister Lucy Ellicott (c. 1785–1807) was married to George Caunter, a one-time lieutenant in the Royal Marines who became acting superintendent of Penang.
