= Sir George Leith, 2nd Baronet =

Sir George Leith KCB Bt
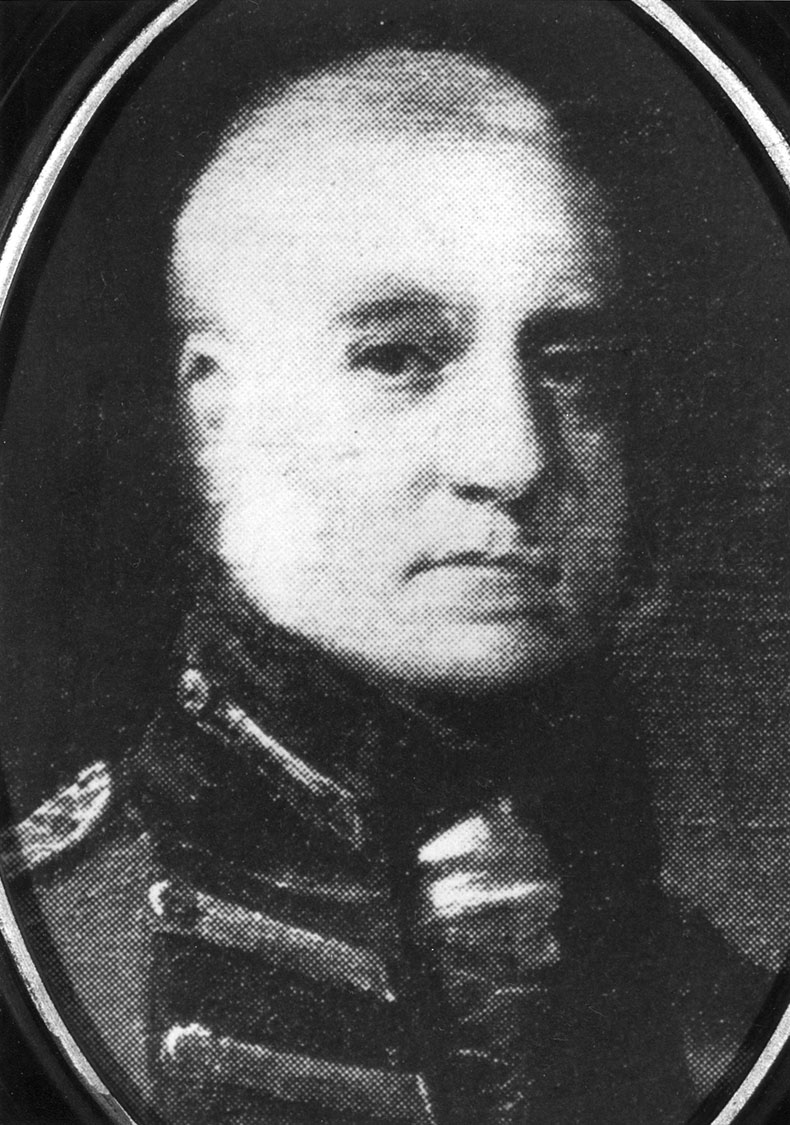
- Born: 1766; Aberdeenshire
- Died: 25 January 1842 (aged 75–76); London
- Military career
- Allegiance: United Kingdom
- Branch: British Army
- Service years: 1779–1842
- Rank: Major-general
- Conflicts: American Revolutionary War; Third Anglo-Mysore War; Siege of Bangalore; Siege of Savendroog; Siege of Seringapatam; French Revolutionary Wars; Napoleonic Wars

Major-General Sir George Alexander William Leith, 2nd Baronet KCB (1766 – 25 January 1842) was the first Lieutenant-Governor of Prince of Wales' Island (Penang Island), replacing George Caunter, a magistrate who was acting superintendent following the resignation and departure of the last governor, Superintendent Major Forbes Ross MacDonald. Leith served in that position from his arrival in 1800 until 1804.

== Military career ==
He was appointed an ensign in the 88th Foot in 1779 and served in Jamaica. He was promoted to lieutenant in 1780. He returned to England in November 1781 and moved to the 2nd Battalion of the Royals. He transferred to the 71st Foot in Madras in 1786. In 1789 he was appointed brigade-major and served under Major-General Sir William Meadows and Governor of India, Lord Cornwallis. He was at the sieges of Bangalore and Sevendroog, the Storming of Tippoo's lines and the surrender of Seringapatam. He was promoted to Captain-Lieutenant 74th Foot on 1 November 1792 and then to captain in the 73rd on 7 March 1795.

He served as aide-de-camp to the Governor-General in 1793 and as brigade major to the King's troops in Bengal in 1794.

In 1797 he sailed on the projected Manila expedition.

== Governorship of Penang ==
In February 1800 Leith was appointed Lieutenant-Governor of Prince of Wales' Island and invested with the whole civil and military authority; on 20 April he arrived and took charge of the government. The Governor-general in council had selected him for the office of Lieutenant-Governor from his personal knowledge of Leith's integrity, prudence and firmness and by his lordship's conviction that the services of Leith would be eminently useful in securing to the company all advantages to be derived from the important settlements (on Prince of Wales' Island).

Shortly after Leith's arrival on the island he deputed Caunter, now First Assistant, to negotiate a treaty with Dziaddin Mukarram Shah II for the cession of a 60-square-mile coastal strip on the mainland, until then part of the Kedah Sultanate. The acquired territory was renamed Province Wellesley after Richard Wellesley, 1st Marquess Wellesley, the Governor-General of India. The Prince of Wales' Island, together with Province Wellesley, now formed the Settlement of Penang (the island having been locally known as Pulau Pinang, where in the Malay language "pulau" means "island" and "pinang" is the name of a variety of local palm tree).

In the words of Leith, writing in 1804, "The immediate advantages arising from the acquisition were, the obtaining of the entire command of the Harbour, which before was never possessed; the reducing of the Peoples of Prya into some degree of order, and a considerable increase in the value of the Opium and Arak farms." The treaty also provided for the free flow of food and commodities from Kedah to Penang and Province Wellesley, while for Kedah it provided a protective strip against enemy attack from the sea.

Leith received a majority in the 17th Foot on 1 January 1800 and a lieutenant-colonelcy in the 2nd West-India Regiment on 13 June 1805. In 1805, because of his part in quelling a rebellion, he was presented with a set of porcelain by the King of Burma. At this time he had also completed, and caused to be published, a book about Prince of Wales Island. He continued as Lieutenant-Governor of Penang until 5 January 1804, when he was succeeded by Sir Robert Townsend Farquhar.

== Subsequent activities ==
Leith was on the point of embarking for the West Indies, when he was ordered to Ireland as Assistant Adjutant-General of the British forces there. He attained the brevet rank of colonel in 1813, major-general in 1819, and on 20 November the same year he was appointed colonel of the 9th Royal Veteran Battalion. He was made a Knight-Commander of the Order of the Bath.

In 1805 he wrote and had published the book, "A Short Account of the Settlement, Produce, and Commerce of Prince of Wales Island, in the Straits of Malacca".

In the 1830s he is recorded as living in a large townhouse, 41 Melville Street, in the west end of Edinburgh.

He died in Scotland in 1842. Leith Street in Penang is named after him.

Baronetage of Great Britain
Preceded by Alexander Leith	Baronet (of Burgh St Peter); 1780–1842	Succeeded by Alexander William Wellesley Leith
