= John Hobart Caunter =

English Church of England clergyman and miscellaneous writer

- Born: 21 June 1792; Dittisham, Devon, Kingdom of Great Britain
- Died: 14 November 1851 (aged 59); Marylebone, Middlesex, United Kingdom
- Occupations: Cleric, writer
- Spouse(s): Matilda Killick (1st), Caroline Bartlett (2nd)
- Children: 3

John Hobart Caunter (21 June 1792 (Note: While the Dictionary of National Biography gives 21 July 1794 as the date of birth, the parish record has a baptism date of 29 June 1793 (Ancestry.com. England, Select Births and Christenings, 1538–1975 [database on-line]. Provo, UT, USA: Ancestry.com Operations, Inc., 2014). The England, Devon Bishop's Transcripts, 1558–1887 of the parish register gives 21 June 1792 as the date of birth and 19 July 1792 as the date of baptism, adding: "Public[l?]y Baptize [?]the 26 of July 1793".) – 14 November 1851) was an English cleric and writer. Serving briefly in India as a cadet, he entered the Church and served as the Incumbent Minister of Portland Chapel in Marylebone, London, for 19 years. His writings primarily focused on Biblical subjects and on India, his best-known work being a collection of tales, The Romance of History. India (1836).

== Life ==
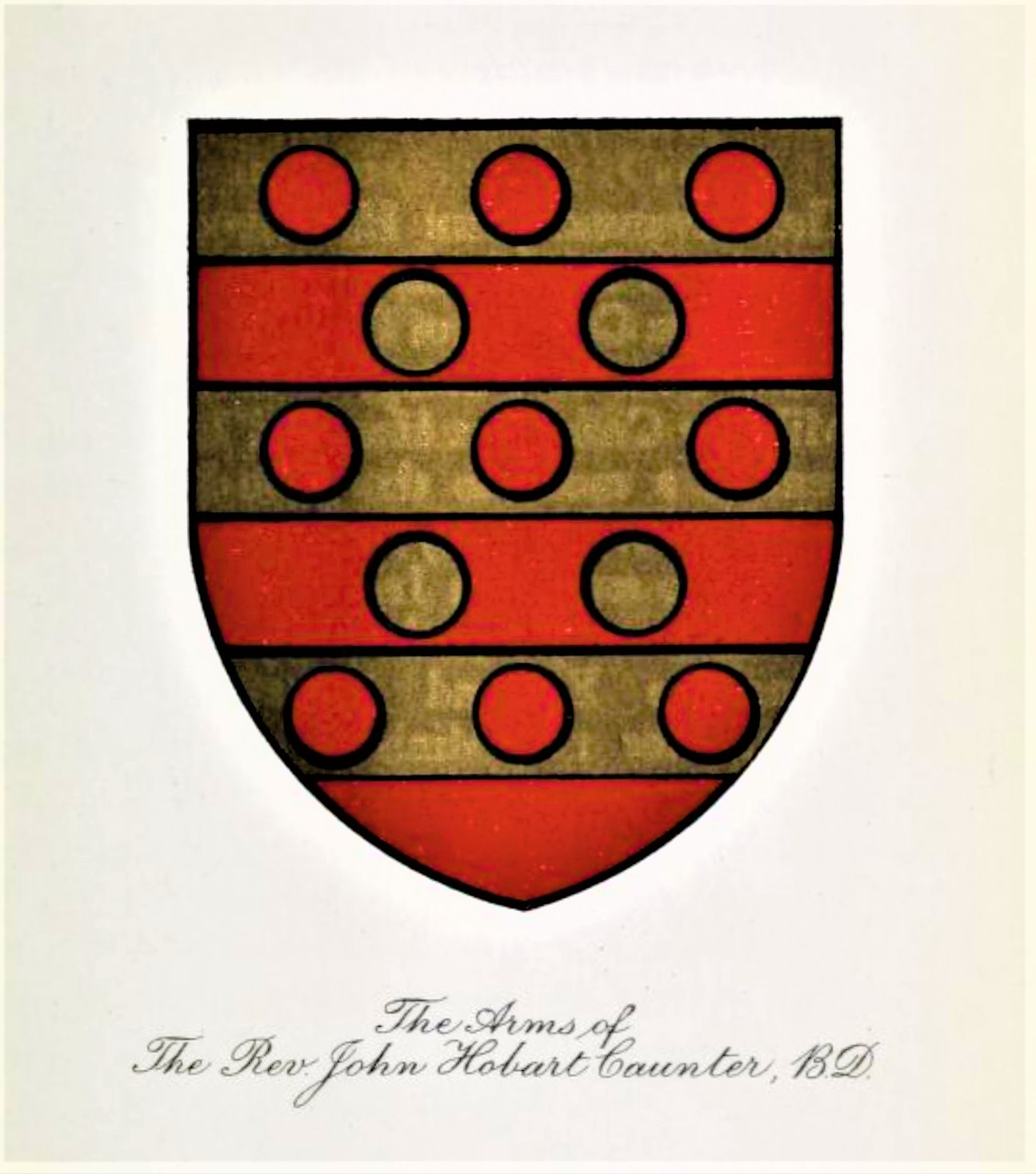
John Hobart Caunter's coat of arms, as depicted in Caunter Family History by F. Lyde Caunter

John Hobart was born at the rectory of Dittisham, a village in South Devon where his maternal grandfather John Hutchings was the rector. Hobart's family were Devonshire gentry; he was the second son of George Caunter of Staverton and Harriett Georgina, née Hutchings, of Dittisham. His middle (and primary) name came from his godfather, Lord Hobart. Hobart's father went to the East when his son was one year old and became acting superintendent of Prince of Wales Island – today Penang, Malaysia. His wife soon joined him and died there in childbirth in 1798, while Hobart stayed in England. His uncle Robert Sparke Hutchings, who became deacon at Dittisham in 1803 and rector in 1805, was his guardian; Hobart later described him as having "a heart perfection scarce could mend" and as being the source of "most of what I know". (Note: In the long poem 'The Cadet', Caunter wrote: "There more than Father,—Uncle,—Guardian, Friend, / Who hast a heart perfection scarce could mend; / Have I from thee imbib'd the precept wise, / And learnt the fadeless charms of lore to prize, / I've listen'd oft to thy preceptive tongue, / On which so sweetly Wisdom's accents hung: / Stor'd from thy mouth that nourishment refin'd, / Which serves for food and polish to the mind: / Leads it, thro' life, to search that blest abode, / Where dwells the just — the bosom of our God. // Yes, valued Uncle! 'tis to thee I owe, / If not the whole, yet most of what I know; / For in gay Boyhood's more unmindful hour, / Ere well acquaint with Wisdom's brighter pow'r; / When sprightly pastimes all my soul engrost, / All serious thought in light amusement lost; / I smil'd on Idleness, I woo'd, caress'd, / And in mine arms the vacant monster press'd; / 'Till thou did'st ope the hidden stores of thought, / And to mine aid the pow'rs of Reason brought." (pp. 63–64.) In the same volume, Caunter included a poem entitled "Lines, chiefly addressed to an affectionate uncle, in consequence of his delivering me, when very young, from a dangerous female acquaintance." In it he again refers to his "Guardian".)

Caunter was educated at the Royal College, Jersey. He was then sent to the East India Company Military Seminary which in 1809 had opened in Addiscombe, Surrey, and went to India as a cadet to the 34th Foot. On his way there he took up a short residence at British-controlled Madeira in 1810. He probably arrived in India in the latter part of 1811, his commission as ensign being dated 25 October of that year. He resigned from the Bombay establishment of the East India Company on 21 January 1814 and sailed back to England, stopping in Mauritius, where his brother George Henry Caunter was a government official.

While a minor he wrote poems that were collected in The Cadet, published in London in 1814; in the preface he cautions that the title poem paints India "in no very flattering colours". He goes on to state in the third person that he left England "chiefly induced by the dear idea of meeting a father, whom, since the earliest period of infancy, he had but once seen : — shortly after his arrival he heard of his death : — he discovered, much to his disappointment, nothing on the Continent of Asia to interest him". Almost his only pleasure, he says, was in reading. The title poem contrasts his disillusionment with India with his recollection of England, "that lov'd Isle where Freedom's children dwell", and of his childhood, which is sketched in idyllic terms. (Note: "England! blest Isle! oft Mem'ry clings to thee, / And draws thy scenes of young felicity; / When, hours of study o'er, I blithly hied / To catch the trout, along the streamlet's side: / Where, oft recumbent on the tufted green, / And gazing on the still, delighted scene, / Imagination would her wings display, / Hover awhile, then raptur'd soar away; / Till—like the spark that's swallow'd in the blaze— / Lost at the last in Thought's involving maze." (pp. 56–57.)) His disappointment as reported in The Cadet did not stop him, however, from writing extensively about India later.

Matriculating at Peterhouse College, Cambridge in 1817, Caunter obtained the degree of Bachelor of Divinity in 1828. He was ordained a deacon in York in 1824 and a priest in London in 1827, becoming Perpetual Curate of Portland Chapel, at different times also called St Paul's Chapel, in Foley Place, Marylebone (1825–44). He was, according to the entry on him in Alumni Cantabrigienses, "[w]ell-known in London as the fashionable preacher of his day." From 1844 to 1846 he was Rector of Hailsham, Sussex. In 1845 a young woman, Elizabeth Taylor, brought an action against Caunter, alleging that he had promised to marry her within a certain time and had failed to do so. She claimed £3,000 in damages. Caunter had previously paid for her education for some years. The counsel for the defendant stated the action had arisen from a "serious misunderstanding" between the parties. On the arrangement that the case be kept out of the papers, a verdict was taken by consent for £750 plus £177 in costs. Newspaper reports appeared regardless.

From 1846 to 1848 Caunter had a lease on the proprietary chapel, St. James Episcopal, at Kennington. In this period he suffered from ill health, causing him to give up the Kennington chapel. From 1848 he served as Curate at Prittlewell, Essex. In 1850 he was arrested and appeared before the Court for Relief of Insolvent Debtors in Lincoln's-Inn. He explained that he had paid most of the damages he had been required to pay Elizabeth Taylor. However, in 1846 he had resigned his well-paid Hailsham curacy as a result of a pledge, and his income had since suffered due to the publicity about the case. He declared that his writings did not bring him any income as they were not on popular subjects, and he and his wife (whom he had married in 1845) had no fortune. Caunter arranged with the opposing creditor and was discharged.

When appearing before the court in December 1850, Caunter was stated to be "late of Prittlewell", although other sources state he held the Prittlewell curacy until his death. In 1847 and days before his death in 1851, he was awarded financial assistance from the Royal Literary Fund, a benevolent fund assisting published British writers in financial difficulties. Shortly after his death the fund assisted his widow. He died at his residence at 21 Edward-street, Portman-square in Marylebone on 14 November 1851 "after a long and painful illness", having caught malaria fever, and was laid to rest in All Souls' Cemetery in Kensal Green.

Caunter was Domestic Chaplain to the Earl of Thanet. He bore arms Barry of six, or and gules, thirteen bezants counter-changed 3, 2, 3, 2, 3. His crest was a naked arm erect, couped at the elbow holding a branch ppr. His motto was "Quam non torret hyems" ("Which winter does not nip with cold", referring to the branch which forms part of the crest).

== Works ==
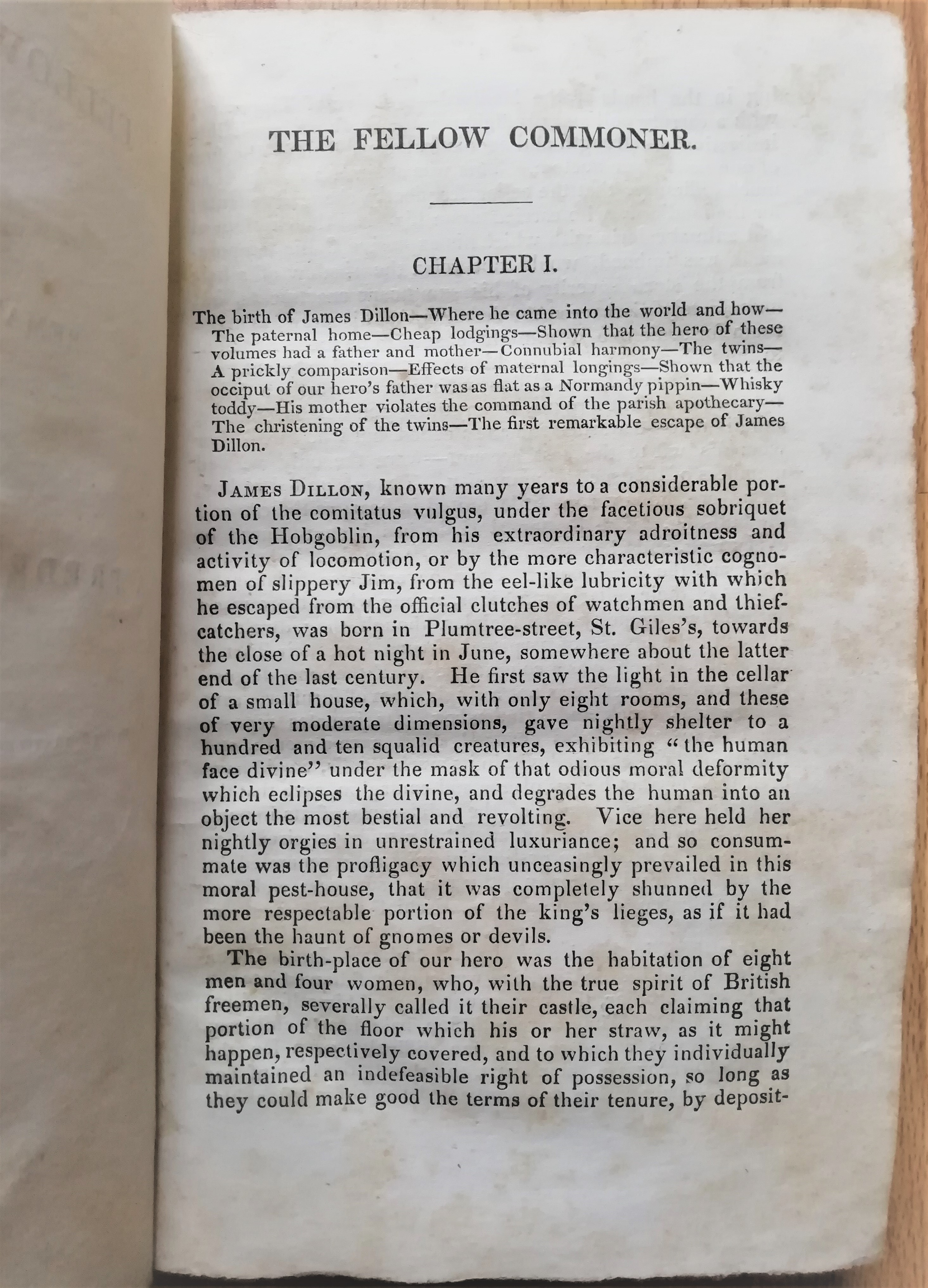
The start of Caunter's picaresque novel The Fellow Commoner (1836)

Caunter's obituary in The Annual Register notes that he "had considerable literary reputation". A brief obituary in Harper's Magazine stated: "Eighteen years ago this gentleman's appearances in the world of ephemeral literature were frequent—and fairly successful." Caunter was on intimate terms with authors such as Caroline Norton, with whom he edited The Court Magazine and Belle Assemblée, William Godwin, (Note: Social calls from and to Caunter are recorded in Godwin's diary mostly from late 1830 to a week before Godwin's death in 1836, and Caunter attended Godwin's funeral.) Frances Sargent Osgood, Basil Hall, John Galt and others. According to magazine The Torch, Caunter "was usually consulted by Mr. Churton [his publisher Edward Churton (1812–1885)] in all his literary undertakings." Caunter was especially prolific in the 1830s, writing fiction and non-fiction on a variety of subjects in a range of genres. He contributed reviews, stories and serials to such general-interest magazines as The Athenaeum and The Gentleman's Magazine. In this decade he helped Mary Shelley place her stories and articles in journals, and he is likely to have assisted her with her unfinished biographical memoir of her father, Life of William Godwin.

His play St. Leon: A Drama. In Three Acts (1835) is based loosely on William Godwin's 1799 Gothic novel St. Leon. It revolves around St. Leon, a French nobleman of fallen fortune living near Madrid, who receives from supernatural spirits the ingredients for creating gold and a potion of eternal life. He is forbidden from divulging the source of his new-found wealth, and it is precisely his secrecy that attracts the suspicion and hostility of family members, friends and the Spanish Inquisition. Caunter dedicated the play to the actress Frances Maria Kelly, stating that without her approbation it would not have been printed. Caunter's novel The Fellow Commoner (1836) first appeared partially as a serial in The Court Magazine under the title 'Remarkable escapes of a predestinated rogue'. It is a picaresque novel with Christian theology mixed in about James (Jemmy) Dillon, a London youth from a dysfunctional background who is orphaned and is taught by an elderly protectress to believe that he is predestined to heaven. Dillon embarks on a career as a wandering thief, and a gipsy girl from an equally dysfunctional background, Phœbe Burrows, becomes his romantic interest. A German translation, Der Spiessgesell, was published in 1837 and an American edition in 1840.

Caunter's most substantial poetic work is The Island Bride. In Six Cantos (1830), a tragic poem in 397 Spenserian stanzas about the tragic fate of two lovers on an island in the Indian Ocean. According to the author's preface, the poem's groundwork was provided by an encounter he had on arriving in Mauritius on his way back to England from India: "there was an old man, with silvery locks, residing on a small estate a few miles distant from the town of Port Louis, who was an object of universal sympathy, having become deranged in consequence of the loss of an only daughter."

Caunter's voluminous religious writings include a two-volume commentary on the first five books of the Bible from a poetic perspective (The Poetry of the Pentateuch, 1839) and an annotated edition of the Bible (1840). Caunter's Familiar Lectures to Children (1835), his abridgement of Lectures to Children (1834) by the American theologian John Todd, appeared in a Dutch translation between 1835 and 1839, which was characterised by its publisher as a "very popular work for children".

In 1870, Caunter was rumoured in the literary magazine Notes and Queries to have been the author of the humorous novel Peter Priggins, the College Scout (London and Paris, 1841), an anonymous work that was initially serialised in the New Monthly Magazine. However, this novel is generally ascribed to Joseph Thomas James Hewlett.

=== Writings on India ===
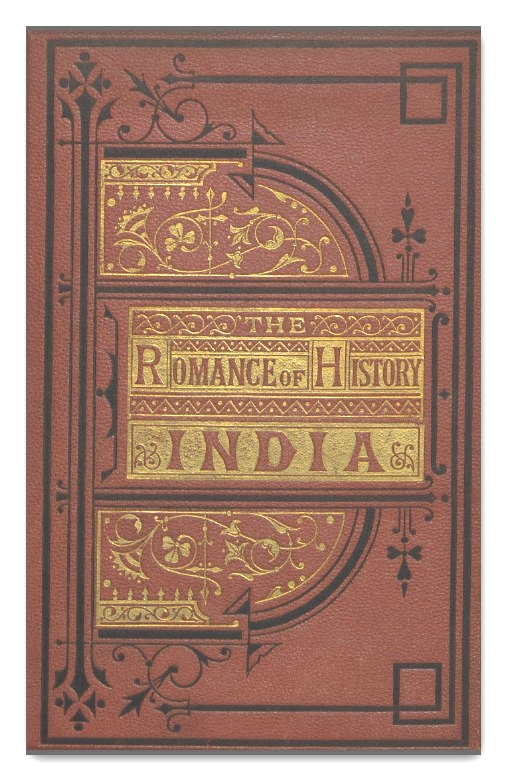
The Romance of History. India (1872 edition, held by the British Library)

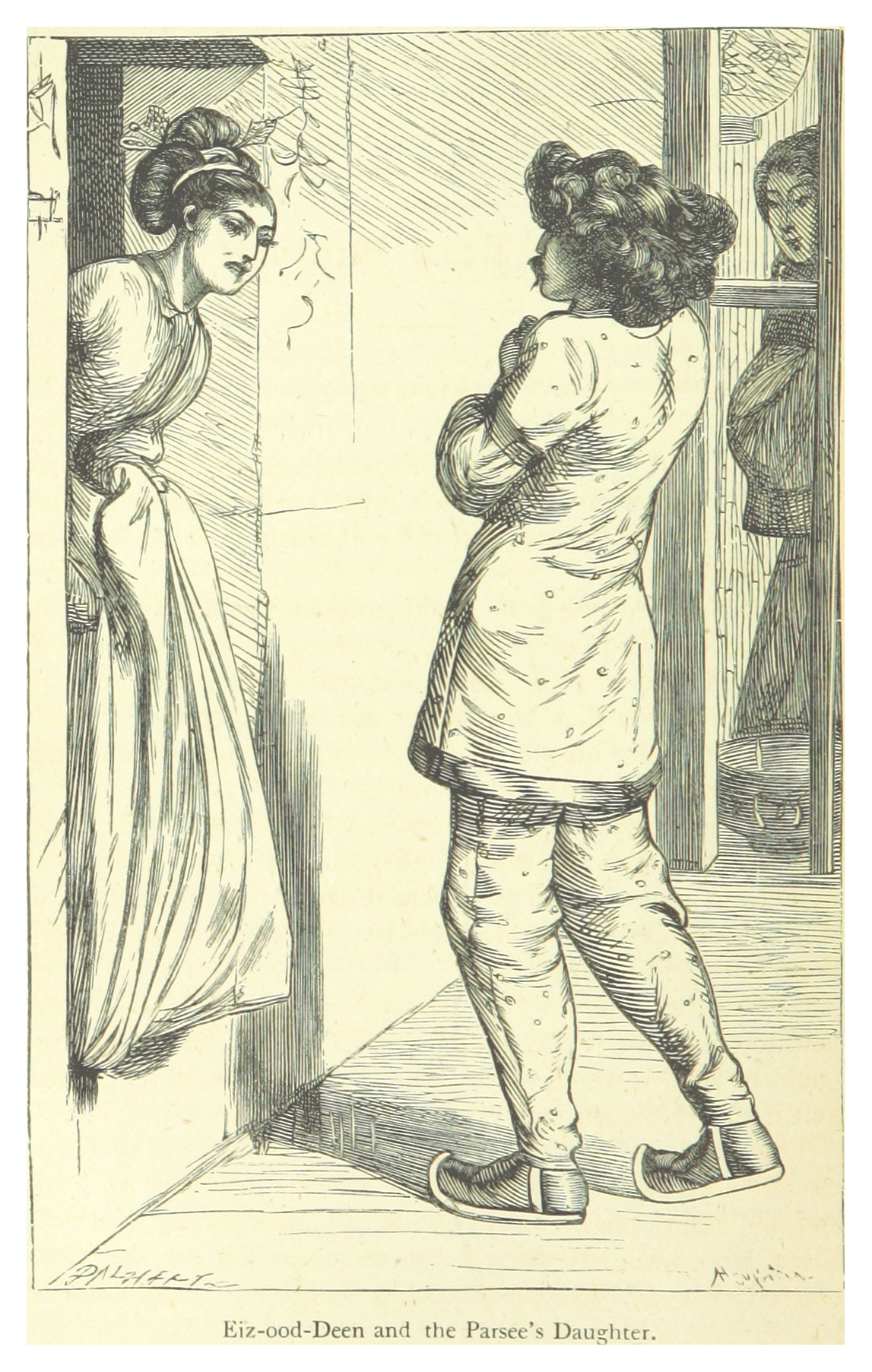
Eiz-ood-Deen and the Parsee's Daughter. Illustration from The Romance of History. India (1872 edition)

Caunter became best known for The Romance of History. India, which first appeared in three volumes in 1836. It was part of a series, The Romance of History, in which different writers offered tales of adventure and romance set – besides India – in England, France, Spain and Italy. Caunter's work consists of 15 romanticised retellings of episodes from the early Muslim conquests in the Indian subcontinent. Each story is preceded by a historical summary. The book served as the basis for Aitihasik Upanyas (1857) by the Bengal writer Bhudev Mukhopadhyay, which consists of a story, 'Saphal svapna', based closely on Caunter's story 'The Traveller's Dream', as well as the first historical novel written in Bengal, Anguriya Binimay, based on Caunter's story 'The Mahratta Chief'. Another Bengal writer, Krishna Kamal Bhattacharya, borrowed from Caunter's story 'The Pariah' for his novel Durakankher Britha Bhraman (1858).

Between 1834 and 1840 a luxury leather-bound series of seven volumes appeared, The Oriental Annual, or Scenes in India, some of the volumes being titled The Oriental Annual – Lives of the Moghul Emperors, Eastern Legendary Tales and Oriental Romances and Caunter's and Daniell's Oriental Annual or scenes in India. Part of the series presents biographies of the conquerors Timur, Babur, Humayun and Akbar. Other volumes purport to be an account by Caunter of his travels in India with the painter and printmaker William Daniell (1769–1837), with engravings on the basis of drawings and pictures made by Daniell for the first five volumes and, for the final two, engravings by Thomas Bacon, F.S.A, from drawings by other artists. Volumes from this series were presented to Princess Victoria of Kent, the later Queen Victoria, by her mother in 1834, 1835 an 1836 and are currently in the collection of Kensington Palace. A French translation in three volumes by P.J. Auguste Urbain appeared from 1834 to 1836.

A number of 20th-century commentators have established that Caunter did not actually accompany Daniell on his travels. The latter had been in India from 1786 to 1794, travelling with his uncle Thomas Daniell; they had worked on a series of prints and William had kept a detailed diary. Caunter was not born until the year the Daniells returned to England. The Calcutta Historical Society wrote in 1923: "... Caunter's account of his alleged wanderings ... is based in the primary degree upon notes and other information furnished by William Daniell himself." In 1962 the Smithsonian Institution noted: "Caunter, a friend of William Daniell, compiled these partly fictitious narratives from Daniell's Journal and oral recollections, adding impressions based on his own experiences in India." (Note: Author Maurice Shellim concurred in 1970: "It is evident that William Daniell supplied the material for the narrative and that Caunter altered it so that it would appear that he was with the artists on their travels.") Already in Caunter's day, there was a controversy around The Oriental Annual when, on publication of the first two volumes, some persons raised a report that Caunter was merely the arranger of materials collected by his brother, Richard McDonald Caunter, an allegation which Hobart as well as a reviewer in The Spectator rejected. (Note: "in order to check the tendency of such a rumour, I take this public opportunity of most unequivocally contradicting it, and declare that Mr. R. M. Caunter, so far from having furnished a single hint, did not even know of the existence of the Oriental Annual until the first volume was printed. The report, however originating, is a mischievous calumny; and I trust that those persons who have heard and believed it will receive this public assurance, that the whole of the volumes, quotations of course excepted, were exclusively written by me; and I entreat them further to believe that I am incapable of putting my name to a book which I did not write." – From Caunter's postscript in The Oriental Annual, 1836 edition.)

=== Critical views ===
Caunter's writings variously received high praise and withering criticism, the same work sometimes attracting both. His debut volume of verse, The Cadet, was savaged in The British Critic: "In his preface [...] the author [...] pleads that his tale was written at sea [...] Whether he wrote under the influence of sea sickness we know not, but we know that he has sickened us completely. His friends, he says, advised him to publish. What dangerous animals some friends are!" On The Romance of History. India, The Asiatic Journal wrote: "We think Mr. Caunter might have been more happy in his selections; nevertheless, there is in these volumes abundant food for those who love to indulge their fancy in the day-dreams of historical romance, and to whom the gorgeous apparatus of Asiatic courts ... [has] more attractions than the sober, mechanical movements of European society." The Court Magazine in its review spoke of "tales of stirring interest, and written with great power." The Monthly Review stated: "We like Mr. Caunter best on Asiatic ground. He seems to be familiar in an uncommon degree with Indian history and life".

B. Sprague Allen in his article 'William Godwin and the Stage' (1920) considered Caunter's play inspired by Godwin's novel St. Leon to be a failure: "Caunter, in dramatizing Godwin's novel, has stripped it of its humanitarian significance. All that he retains are the melodramatic elements, the familiar features of a sensational Gothic romance." The novel The Fellow Commoner (1836) drew disparate responses. "For a novel of spirit, crowded with adventures, and written con amore, we commend "The Fellow Commoner"", wrote The Court Magazine, whereas The Monthly Review, besides taking issue with Caunter's representation of a religious heresy, opined: "The story may entertain the lovers of the marvellous, and confirm them more and more in their disrelish for rational or elegant literature; but this negative praise is the utmost we can afford. The style of the work is not good; it is forced, and loaded with far-fetched epigrams and unnecessary quotations."

The Poetry of the Pentateuch (1939), in which Caunter argues that specific principles of prosody and poetic construction are at work in the Hebrew of the Pentateuch, was praised in a review by Chambers' Edinburgh Journal: "Mr Caunter ... [leaves] nothing further to be wished for with respect to grave critical commentary, while, at the same time, the well-known charms of the author's style ... render the work an acceptable one to the mere lover of elegant literature." The Monthly Chronicle considered Caunter's study to display "an extent of erudition and a severe refinement of taste, which have rarely been equalled by any writer within the memory of the living generation."

Writing on The Island Bride. In Six Cantos (1830), literary historian David Hill Radcliffe of Virginia Tech sees influences from Campbell, Byron, Milton, Shakespeare and Southey, and calls the work "stuffed-owl poetry of the highest order; readers with the pertinacity necessary to reach the last canto will encounter truly wonderful things." Critics at the time of publication wrote: "if he has not equalled a poem which ranks among the first in the English language, he has at least done that which ought to establish his reputation" (Morning Post, 15 April 1830); "A little romantic tale, with few incidents, and those chiefly of the domestic kind, but abundance of gentle sentiment and charming scenery" (Monthly Magazine, June 1830); "The work before us has a touching interest in its plot, and, generally speaking, a smoothness and sweetness of versification ... Its faults are — too much diffuseness, too great an amplitude of description, too frequent an intrusion of weak similes and prosaic lines ... and a vein of moralizing" (La Belle Assemblee, July 1830).

The Literary Gazette decried Caunter's An Inquiry into the History and Character of Rahab (1850) as an "Injurious literal interpretation of Scripture" ("the reverend author appears to have fallen desperately in love with "Rahab, the Harlot" of Scripture; and she has led him a pretty dance"), whereas The Christian Witness, and Church Members' Magazine called it "a mass of good reading, calculated to interest, instruct, and edify" and stated: "The work throughout displays vigorous thinking, clothed in adequate expression."

== Family ==
John Hobart Caunter married a widow, Matilda Killick née Crowther (c.1772–1838), in London in 1815. She was originally from Devon; her mother was a Caunter. After her death he married Caroline Bartlett (c.1819–1902) in London in 1845. Three children were born from this second marriage: Alice (1846–1896), Robert Hobart (1847–1937) and Blanche (1849–1921). After Caunter's death a public subscription was opened for the relief of his widow and children. Caroline remarried ten years later and died in Newtown, New South Wales at the home of her son, Hobe. John Hobart's daughter Blanche married James Watson Nicol, a son of the Scottish figure and genre painter Erskine Nicol; their daughter Blanche Arnold Hameen Nicol became the stage actress known as Ruby Ray.

Caunter's older brother, George Henry Caunter (1791–1843), was an early musical critic and wrote in some of the same periodicals as Hobart. Among Hobart's other siblings was a younger brother, Richard McDonald Caunter (1798–1879), who was also a minister in the Church of England and wrote Attila, a Tragedy; and Other Poems (1832). However, at least several of the poems in this volume had previously appeared in various magazines and annuals, in versions differing to a greater or lesser extent from those in the book, as being from the hand of John Hobart Caunter.

== Bibliography ==
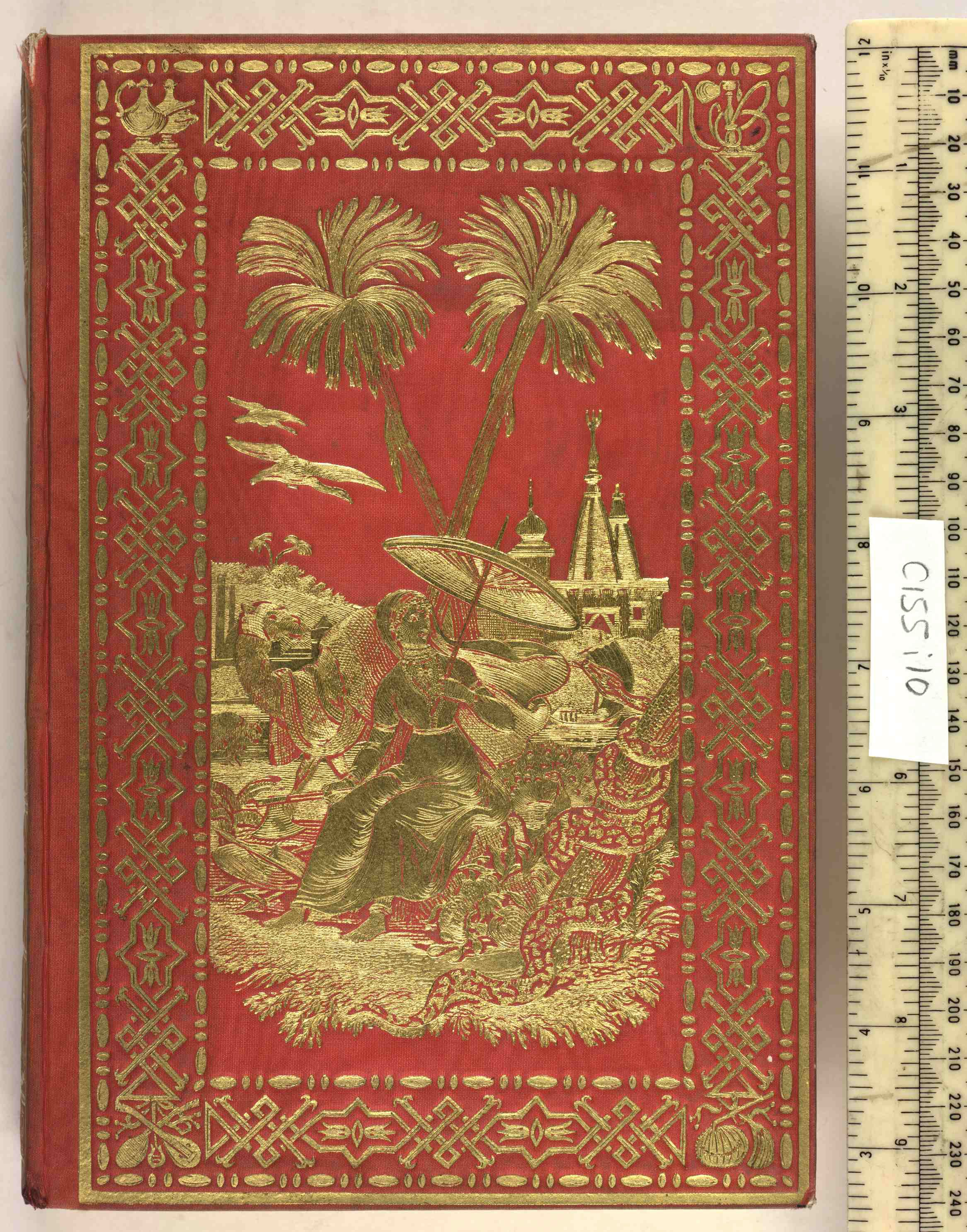
A volume of Tableaux pittoresques de l'Inde, P.J. Auguste Urbain's French translation of The Oriental Annual

Several of John Hobart Caunter's works were (initially) published anonymously.

=== Poetry ===
- The Cadet; A Poem, In Six Parts: Containing Remarks on British India. To Which Is Added, Egbert and Amelia; In Four Parts: With Other Poems (2 vols.) (London: Robert Jennings, 1814. Author 'A Late Resident in the East', identified as John Hobart Caunter in A Dictionary of Literary Pseudonyms in the English Language)
- The Island Bride. In Six Cantos (London: Edward Bull, 1830)
- Brief Summary of a late interesting Report (The House that Josh burnt) (parody of an enquiry into the blaze that, in October 1834, largely destroyed the Houses of Parliament, 1834)
- A Bard's tribute to The Queen (London: Bradbury & Evans, 1838. Presented to Victoria, Duchess of Kent, by the author)
- Hymns for Fasts & Festivals (London: Jefferys & Nelson, 1840, with compositions by T. Philipps)
- The Triumph of Evil; a Poem in Eight Cantos (London, 1845)

=== Play ===
- St. Leon: A Drama. In Three Acts (London: Edward Churton, 1835)

=== Prose fiction ===
- The Romance of History. India (stories, 3 vols.) (London: Edward Churton, 1836). Republished in a single volume by Frederick Warne & Co., both in the Chandos Classics under its original title and under the title Legendary and Romantic Tales of Indian History (London)
- The Fellow Commoner (novel, 3 vols.) (London: Edward Churton, 1836). Republished in two vols. as The Fellow Commoner: or Remarkable Escapes of a Predestinated Rogue (Philadelphia: E.L. Carey & A. Hart, 1838); translated into German as Der Spiessgesell (Leipzig: Theodor Fischer, 1837)

=== Non-fiction ===
- Sermons (3 vols., London: E. Bull / J.G. & F. Rivington, 1832–1842)
- The Oriental Annual (7 vols., London: Whittaker & Co./Edward Bull/Edward Churton/Charles Tilt, 1834–1840). With engravings from original drawings by William Daniell, R. A. and others. French translation by P.J. Auguste Urbain in three volumes, Tableaux pittoresques de l'Inde, also L'Inde pittoresque, published by Fd. Bellizard & Cie (Paris, 1834–1836). Selections translated into Dutch as "Tooneelen in Indië" for the series Het leeskabinet. Mengelwerk tot gezellig onderhoud voor beschaafde kinderen (Amsterdam: Hendrik Frijlink, 1834, 1836)
- Illustrations of the Bible. By Westall and Martin. With Descriptions by the Rev. Hobart Caunter, B.D. (2 vols., London: Edward Churton, 1835–1836). Republished as Pictorial Illustrations of the Old and New Testaments (London: Henry G. Bohn, 1838) and as Illustrations of the Old [and New] Testament. By Westall and Martin. With descriptions by ... H.C. (2 vols., London, 1877; part of the 'National Sunday Library')
- Familiar Lectures to Children; in which the important truths of the Gospel are engagingly set forth (London: John W. Parker, 1835). An abridgement by Caunter of Lectures to Children, Familiarly Illustrating Important Truth by John Todd (1834). Caunter's abridgement appeared in Dutch as Gemeenzame voorlezingen, gehouden voor kinderen, waarin de gewigtigste waarheden van het Evangelie op eene bevattelijke wijze voorgesteld worden (Nijmegen: J.F. Thieme, between 1835 and 1839)
- Posthumous Records of a London Clergyman (London: John W. Parker, 1835; published in America as Confessions and Crimes; or, Posthumous Records of a London Clergyman, Philadelphia: E. L. Carey & A. Hart, 1836; also under its original title by Leavitt, Lord & Co. of New York and Crocker & Brewster of Boston, 1836. Author 'A London Clergyman', identified as John Hobart Caunter in A Dictionary of Literary Pseudonyms in the English Language)
- The Poetry of the Pentateuch (2 vols.) (London: E. Churton, 1839)
- A Sermon Preached at Saint Peter's, Cornhill (London: James Madden, 1839)
- The Holy Bible, containing the Old and New Testaments: As Appointed to be Read in Churches. With Notes by the Rev. John Hobart Caunter, B.D. (London: John Field, 1840, 1861). With illustrations by several artists including Richard Westall
- Illustrations of the Five Books of Moses, 2 vols. (1847)
- New Armageddon (a satire on Southend, written while at Prittlewell, between 1848 and 1851)
- Sermons on The Lord's Prayer and the Eight Beatitudes (London: Charles Ollier, 1849)
- An Inquiry into the History and Character of Rahab (London: Longman, 1850)
