= Dittisham =

Village in Devon, England

Coordinates: 50.3857°N 3.6038°W

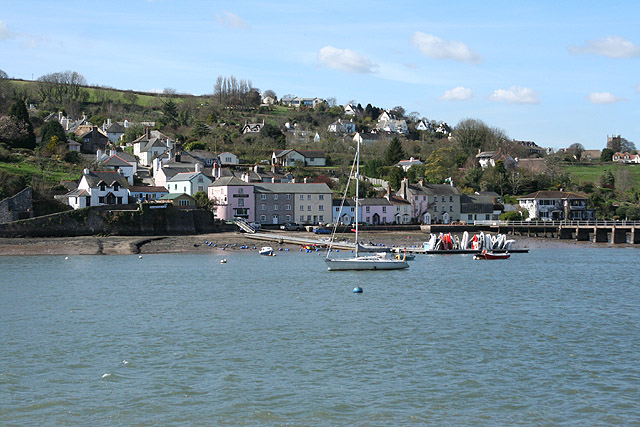
- Dittisham seen from Greenway Quay

- Location within Devon
- Population: 424 (Parish)
- OS grid reference: SX859552
- Civil parish: Dittisham
- District: South Hams
- Shire county: Devon
- Region: South West
- Country: England
- Sovereign state: United Kingdom
- Post town: DARTMOUTH
- Postcode district: TQ6
- Dialling code: 01803
- Police: Devon and Cornwall
- Fire: Devon and Somerset
- Ambulance: South Western

Dittisham /ˈdɪtsəm/ is a village and civil parish in the South Hams district of the English county Devon. It is situated on the west bank of the tidal River Dart, 2 miles (3.2 km) upstream of Dartmouth.

The Greenway Ferry carries pedestrians across the river from Dittisham to Greenway Quay, adjacent to the Greenway Estate. Once the home of the crime writer Agatha Christie, this has views across the river, and the house and gardens are now owned by the National Trust and are open to the public.

Gurrow Point is a private estate on the edge of Dittisham.

In 2001, the parish had a population of 424. The figures for 1801 and 1901 are 639 and 549.

Dittisham has given its name to the Dittisham plum, a dessert variety grown here.

The fictitious Lady Dittisham is one of the main characters in Agatha Christie's Five Little Pigs.

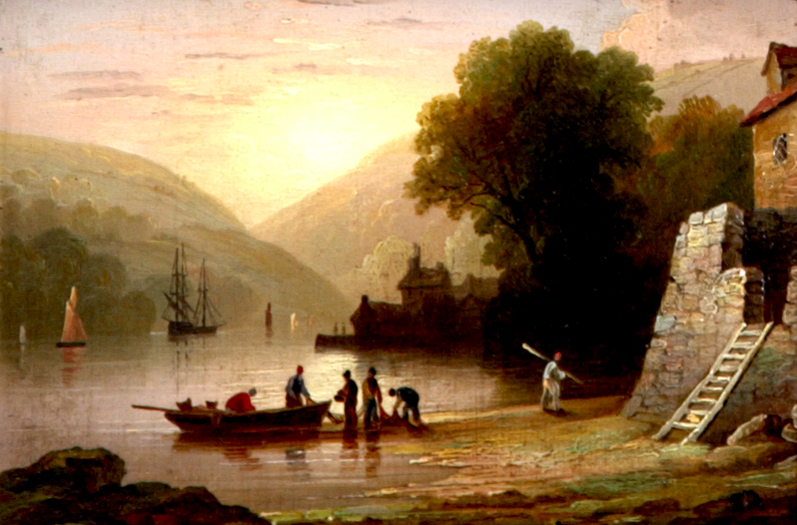
Dittisham on the River Dart, oil painting by John Wallace Tucker, between 1865 and 1867

== Historic estates ==
The parish of Dittisham contains various historic estates including:

- Bosum's Hele (alias Bozun's Hele, Bozunsele, etc., modern: "Bozomzeal"), a former seat of the Bosom family. Sir Baldwin de Fulford (died 1476) of Great Fulford in the parish of Dunsford, Devon, married Elizabeth (or Jennet) Bosum, daughter and heiress of John Bosum (alias Bosom, Bozun, Bosum, etc.) of Bosom's Hele, by his wife Johane Fortescue. Elizabeth Bozom survived her husband and married secondly to Sir William Huddesfield (died 1499), of Shillingford St. George, Devon, Attorney General to King Edward IV (1461–1483). Huddesfield married secondly (as her third husband) to Katherine Courtenay, a daughter of Sir Philip Courtenay (died 1463) of Powderham, Devon. A monumental brass of Huddesfield and his second wife Katherine Courtenay survives in Shillingford St George Church, and the arms of Bosome (Azure, three bird bolts in pale points downward or) survive in a stained-glass window in the same church. By Jennet Bosome, heiress of Bozum's Hele, he had children two sons and two daughters, namely Thomasine Fulford, who married John Wise of Sydenham House, from whom was descended John Russell, 1st Earl of Bedford (c. 1485 – 1555), the most powerful magnate in Devon, and another daughter Alice Fulford, who married Sir William Cary of Cockington, from whom was descended Lord Hunsdon and the Earls of Monmouth and Dover. His younger son was John Fulford (died 1518), a Canon of Exeter Cathedral and Archdeacon successively of Totnes, Cornwall and Exeter, whose large black marble ledger stone survives in Exeter Cathedral, behind the high altar The manor of Bosom's Hele was inherited by the Fulford family and the arms of Bozom appear in the 5th quarter of the 16th century relief sculpted escutcheon over the main entrance to Great Fulford House.

== Dittisham Plum ==
The Dittisham Ploughman Plum (Prunus domestica) has been described as having a rich sweet taste, with a smell reminiscent of honey and sweet grapes. This locally-renowned dessert variety has a very short harvest season of around 10 days from the early/mid-August. Very similar in size to the more readily available supermarket fruits, the highly localised plum is much redder in colouration, but oblong in shape in comparison to more commercial varieties. The flesh is juicy and lends itself well to excellent jam making.

== Notable people ==
- George Caunter, of nearby Staverton, lived in Dittisham, where he married Harriett Georgina Hutchings. He became Acting Superintendent of Penang (then Prince of Wales Island), as well as holding a number of other posts in the administration of the island. He was the father of John Hobart, George Henry and Richard McDonald.
- John Hobart Caunter, a clergyman and writer, was baptised at Dittisham in 1793. He became well-known in London as the fashionable preacher of his day and wrote popular works such as The Oriental Annual, or Scenes in India (1834-1840) and The Romance of History. India (1836).
- George Henry Caunter, Hobart's elder brother, was baptised at Dittisham in 1791; he became President of the Vice Admiralty Court in Mauritius and was a writer and music critic.
- Richard McDonald Caunter, a clergyman and writer, was born in Penang (then Prince of Wales Island) in 1798, but grew up in Dittisham like his aforementioned brothers.
- Robert Sparke Hutchings, a son of Dittisham Rector John Hutchings, was baptised in Dittisham in 1781 and became the Rector there himself. He founded Penang Free School in 1816 and revised Melchior Leydekker's 1733 Malay translation of the New Testament. A row of stained-glass windows in St George's Church in Dittisham bear the inscription: "To God and the Church in memory of John Hutchings and Robt Sparke Hutchings formerly Rectors of this Parish".
- Brian Patten, poet, lived in Dittisham until his death in 2025.

== See also ==
- Lord's Wood, Dittisham
