= Philip Mannington =

British colonial administrator (died 1806)

Philip Mannington (died 1806) was a British colonial administrator. He arrived as the first magistrate of the Prince of Wales' Island (Penang Island) and governed the land as Superintendent and acting governor of Prince of Wales' Island, after Sir Francis Light, from 1794. Ill health caused by the unhealthy living conditions at the time forced him to resign in 1796. He was succeeded by Major Forbes Ross MacDonald. Mannington also developed major plantations of pepper in the Air Itam district of Penang island. When he died in 1806, his estate "in the district of Ayer Etam, called Mount Felix, on the left side of the road leading to the Flagstaff Hill, about four and a half miles from town" and said to contain 25,000 pepper vines, was put up for auction.
