= George Henry Caunter =

English judge and miscellaneous writer

- Born: 24 February 1791; Dittisham, Devon, Kingdom of Great Britain
- Died: 6 August 1843 (aged 52); Gloucester, Gloucestershire, United Kingdom
- Occupations: translator, interpreter, advocate, judge, writer, editor, music critic, musician
- Spouse(s): Aurélie Bestel (1st), Pauline Brie (2nd)
- Children: 3

George Henry Caunter (24 February 1791 – 6 August 1843) was an English judge and miscellaneous writer. Having been President of the Vice Admiralty Court in Mauritius, he was convicted in France of bigamy and, returning to England, wrote about music and other topics.

== Life ==
George Henry was born into Devonshire gentry in the South Devon village of Dittisham. He was the eldest child of George Caunter of Staverton and Harriett Georgina, née Hutchings, of Dittisham. His father went to the East when his son was about four years old and became acting superintendent of Prince of Wales Island - today Penang, Malaysia. His wife soon joined him and died there in childbirth in 1798.

In 1810 the British captured the Indian Ocean island of Isle de France, which became the Crown Colony of Mauritius. The following year Caunter, who had acquired a mastery of French while living in France as a teenager, was appointed superintendent of the press as well as sworn translator and interpreter to the government in Mauritius. He became assistant in the Treasury office in June 1812 and was granted leave in that year to travel to Prince of Wales Island to administer the estate of his father, who had died at the end of 1811. He returned to Mauritius and in 1813 married a French politician's daughter, Mauritius-born Aurélie Bestel "who, according to a miniature of her playing the harp, was very beautiful". In 1818, Caunter was working as an advocate in the Vice Admiralty Court, and in March of that year the acting governor, Hall, appointed him Judge of the court after having dismissed his predecessor, judge Smith, whom Hall considered reluctant to suppress the trafficking of slaves to Mauritius. In his capacity as judge, Caunter was involved in the British attempts to suppress the slave trade. According to the newspaper John Bull, he quitted Mauritius when the British government restored Smith to his former office.

In 1819 Caunter travelled to England with his brother-in-law, Nicolas Gustave Bestel, later acting Chief Judge of the Supreme Court of Mauritius. Although his wife and two infant sons remained in Mauritius, he stayed in England over the next years. In 1824 he went to Paris to research an intended publication on musical theory. It was here that he met and proceeded to marry a young woman, Pauline Brie. In October 1825, only months after the marriage, her father found out from Caunter's brother-in-law that Caunter was already married. Charged with bigamy, Caunter alleged that he had originally been married in Madras in 1811, to a woman who was ill when he left for Mauritius. He had kept quiet about her there to avoid opprobrium for having married a Creole woman. He had received news of her death and had married Aurélie Bestel. Finding out later that his first wife had not died until after he had married Aurélie, he considered his marriage to the latter to be legally void. This, he argued, allowed him to marry Mlle Brie legally in Paris.

The French court allowed Caunter to seek proof of his Madras marriage from the British colonial authorities, Caunter meanwhile remaining in custody in La Force Prison for three years. As proof was not forthcoming, he was finally convicted in 1828 and sentenced to seven years' forced labour. A witness at the trial declared that "Mr Canning [George Canning, the British Prime Minister from April to August 1827] himself intervened on behalf of Mr Caunter" while the latter was in custody. The Gazette des tribunaux concluded its detailed coverage of the trial with the observation that "The accused, whose features are regular and whose physiognomy is remarkable, maintained the most profound calm throughout the proceedings and even on hearing the verdict." The British embassy obtained a commutation of the sentence to banishment, and in 1829 Caunter returned to England. The case attracted the attention of the international press.

In the years that followed, Caunter participated in the cultural life of London and was active as a reviewer, editor, composer, music performer, translator and writer. About 1837 he moved to Gloucester, where over the years he gave series of talks on such subjects as mesmerism and the "poetry of sound" to the Gloucester Literary and Scientific Association and the Mechanics' Institution. In 1842 he conceived and helped organise a performance of sacred music, at which he played the violoncello, at St Mary de Crypt Church to raise funds for the restoration of the church. The following year, Caunter died in Barnwood, Gloucester, of tuberculosis after a long, painful illness; he was 52. He was buried in Barnwood (St Lawrence) Churchyard. (Note: "He died at Barnwood and was buried in Barnwood Churchyard on the north side of the Church close to the Hedge under a stately Elm next to the Road. My gifted Cousin the late John Jones the Founder of our Local Museum intended to have placed a stone over his remains to his memory but was precluded from doing so by adverse circumstances. I often visited his little mound of earth. The last time I visited it the humble mound had disappeared." - From a handwritten note by the Gloucester historian Henry Yates Jones Taylor (1826-1906), inserted in a copy of Caunter's Hand-Book of Chemistry held in the Gloucester Archives.)

== Works ==
=== Magazine editorship, music writing and composition ===
Caunter became well-known in London's literary circles in the 1830s. He was one of the principal contributors to the general-interest magazine The Athenæum, writing reviews of French-language books, and edited The Court Magazine for some years after the editorship of Caroline Norton. His younger brother, the clergyman and writer John Hobart Caunter, was at this time writing for some of the same titles.

George Henry's obituary in The Gentleman's Magazine noted that he "was a most indefatigable and able writer, although his name was rarely prefixed to his productions. ... [He] was considered one of the first musical critics in the metropolis." A German obituary noted he was "especially valued as a music critic." He wrote about composers and musicians such as Rossini, Aspull, Dragonetti, Meyerbeer and Beethoven. He claimed to have been a friend of the latter, reporting that Beethoven used to confide to him that he (Beethoven) was born two centuries before his time. In his 1836 essay on Meyerbeer, Caunter argues that "The opera of "Robert le Diable" is alone sufficient to immortalise the name of Meyerbeer."

Caunter played the violoncello, (Note: Caunter "was a most excellent and an accomplished Musician. He Played the Violoncello admirably, was a composer of Music, and for several years wrote Critiques on our musical Festivals." - From a handwritten note by the Gloucester historian Henry Yates Jones Taylor (1826-1906), inserted in a copy of Caunter's Hand-Book of Chemistry held in the Gloucester Archives.) being called by the Gloucestershire Chronicle "one of the finest amateur performers on the violoncello in the country". He also published compositions of his own, such as Grand trio pour violon, alto et violoncelle, opéra 10 (c. 1820) and Twelve Fantasias on Favourite Airs by Mozart and Paisiello, for the Piano-forte and Violoncello (1831). The Musical World considered his composition The Banks of the Wye a "melody by no means devoid of grace" and his When Jove from His Throne a "clear, bold, and effective melody", though finding faults in both pieces. Reviewing his composition Think of Thee No More, the Gloucester Journal in 1842 wrote that Caunter had been "long known to the dilettanti and professionals, not of Gloucester only, but of London and the Continent, as a sound, though perhaps occasionally a rather severe, musical critic; and the present composition establishes that he is not amenable to the charge which is sometimes brought against our critics, that they are not always themselves practically acquainted with the subjects on which they venture to pronounce a judgment".

=== Other writing ===
Working from the manuscripts of the French Napoleonic Marshal Ney, Caunter produced a translation, Military Studies by Marshal Ney; Written for the Use of His Officers (1833). He contributed articles on cookery to the Magazine of Domestic Economy. The London publisher William S. Orr published a series of handbooks written by Caunter, including The Hand-Book of Medicine, The Hand-Book of Cookery, The Hand-Book of Chemistry, The Hand-Book of the Toilette and The Hand-Book of Bathing (previously published by William Smith as Familiar Hints on Sea-Bathing). (Note: Only The Hand-Book of Chemistry was published under Caunter's name. The Gloucester historian Henry Yates Jones Taylor (1826-1906), who had known Caunter personally, identified him as the author of "a series of Hand Books for Orr & Co London. Hand Book of Chemistry of Cookery. the Toilet, Household Surgery & Medicine" (from a handwritten note inserted in a copy of Caunter's Hand-Book of Chemistry held in the Gloucester Archives). Gloucestershire Notes and Queries. Volume: VIII (1902) by W. P. W. Phillimore and Sidney J. Madge (Eds.), London: Phillimore & Co., states that "the late Mr. Henry Jeffs collected all the local recipes extant for Dr. Caunter, who was engaged in the production and compilation of "Orr’s Handbook of Cookery."" The Hand-Book of Bathing is ascribed on the title page to "the author of the "Hand-Book of the Toilette."", and The Hand-Book of the Toilette is ascribed on the title page to "the author of "Familiar Hints on Sea-Bathing," the Hand-Book of Cookery, &c.")

A review in The Athenæum of Familiar Hints on Sea-Bathing considered the work "not written without ability or without knowledge" and found the author to be "a great advocate for sea-bathing" and "a dashing fellow—rather too dashing perhaps—in his opinions, and the modes of arriving at them". Anthony Nesbit and his sons of Kennington-House Academy considered The Hand-Book of Chemistry to be "well adapted for Schools". The Age considered the handbook to be "elaborate without being obscure, and learned without being pedantic", while The Atlas observed: "considered as a popular essay, the publication will be found too elaborate. The professional student in chemistry will derive great advantage from it, and to such it may be strongly recommended".

== Family ==
Caunter's wife Aurélie Bestel (b. 1795) died in Mauritius in 1855. His father-in-law, Antoine Bestel (1766-1852), had been secretary of the Assemblée Coloniale in Mauritius (then the Isle de France) during the French Revolution. In 1800 he had helped thwart a Royalist conspiracy in the island of Réunion. He remained active in the public affairs of Mauritius under British sovereignty.

Of the three children of George Henry and Aurélie, two died in infancy; the surviving child, Lewis Anthony Henry Caunter (1815-1873), became a lawyer in Mauritius. In 1847 this son was the recipient of an envelope to which was affixed the 2d "Blue Mauritius", which would become one of the most valuable stamps in the world. The extant fragment of envelope with the stamp is known among collectors as the "Caunter fragment" or (based on the envelope's apparent reading) the "Caunten fragment". Henry Caunter, who died in Paris, has a tomb in Père Lachaise Cemetery.

Besides the writer John Hobart Caunter (1794-1851), George Henry had a brother, Richard McDonald Caunter (1798-1879), who like Hobart was a minister in the Church of England and who was billed as the author of Attila, a Tragedy; and Other Poems (1832).

== Book publications ==
- The Hand-Book of Medicine (London: Wm. S. Orr and Co., and W. & R. Chambers, Edinburgh)
- The Hand-Book of Cookery (London: William S. Orr and Co. and W. & R. Chambers, Edinburgh, 1838)
- Familiar Hints on Sea-Bathing (London: William Smith, 1838)
- The Hand-Book of Chemistry (London: Wm. S. Orr and Co., and W. & R. Chambers, Edinburgh, 1839)
- The Hand-Book of the Toilette (London: W. S. Orr and Co., 1839, second edition 1841)
- The Hand-Book of Bathing (London: William S. Orr and Co. and W. & R. Chambers, Edinburgh, 1841, reissue of Familiar Hints on Sea-Bathing)
