= George Caunter =

British colonial administrator

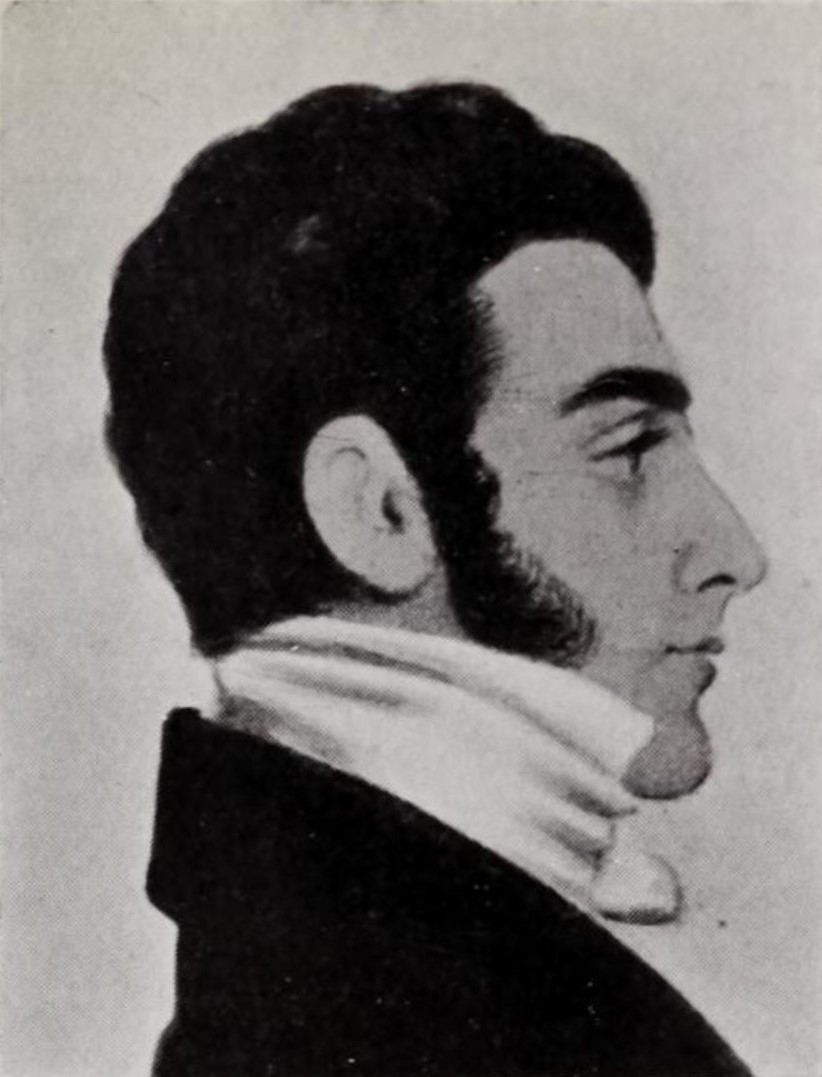
- Born: c. June 1758; Staverton, Devon, Kingdom of Great Britain
- Died: 25 December 1811 (aged 53); At sea
- Spouse(s): Harriett Georgina Hutchings (1st), Lucy Ellicott (2nd)

George Caunter (c. June 1758 – 25 December 1811) was a British administrator who governed Prince of Wales Island (Penang Island) as Acting Superintendent from 1797 to 1798 and again from 1798 to 1800. As First Assistant under Lieutenant-Governor Leith, he negotiated the treaty that brought Province Wellesley under British sovereignty in 1800 and that provided, in British eyes, an unequivocal basis for British sovereignty over Penang Island. At various times Caunter further held the offices of marine storekeeper, master attendant, Chief Magistrate, Treasurer and Chaplain in Penang.

== Life and family ==
George Caunter was baptised in his family's ancestral Devonshire parish of Staverton on 13 June 1758. His parents were George Caunter, gent. of Abham house, Staverton – a farmer, cider-maker and nurseryman, and Hester Rockey of Werrington, Devon (now Cornwall).

He married Harriett Georgina Hutchings (Dittisham, Devon, 1769 – Govt. House, George Town, Penang, 1798), a daughter of the Rector of Dittisham. A brother of hers, Robert Sparke Hutchings, founded Penang Free School in 1816, was involved in the founding of the Raffles Institution in Singapore and revised an early Malay translation of the Bible. George and Harriett's children were George Henry (1791–1843), John Hobart (1793–1851), Harriett Georgina Hutchings (1793–1826, married later Penang governor Robert Ibbetson), Sarah Sparke (1798–1875) and Richard McDonald (1798–1879).

== Career ==
=== Arrival in Penang ===
Caunter, a Second Lieutenant in the Royal Marines, became a Reduced Second Lieutenant on 13 April 1781 and was put on half-pay from 22 March 1792. He became friendly with East India Company official John Shore, the later Baron Teignmouth, and accompanied him to the East. Caunter, then aged 36, first arrived in Penang aboard the Nepture on 7 May 1795 with an appointment as marine storekeeper and master attendant, functions he took over from John Beanland. Following the death of Acting Superintendent Thomas Pigou in early 1796, Caunter was appointed Third Assistant in the administration of the island.

=== Friction with the mercantile community ===
Superintendent Major Forbes Ross MacDonald sent Caunter to Bengal on "special business" in June 1796. In August, the Governor General in Council appointed Caunter First Assistant to MacDonald. Returning to Prince of Wales Island in September with new instructions to convey to MacDonald, Caunter found there was a "serious rupture" between the island's British administration and the Sultan of Kedah, Abdullah Mukarram Shah. This seemed due in part to agitation by the mercantile community following MacDonald's attempt to introduce import/export duties and taxes. The Sultan had placed visiting vessels from Prince of Wales Island under an embargo. Caunter managed to resolve the situation amicably and obtained a release of the vessels.

=== Superintendency of Prince of Wales Island ===
On 24 September 1797, Caunter was appointed Acting Superintendent of Prince of Wales Island while MacDonald was away in Bengal. In this period, Caunter and Philip Manington Jnr acted as Magistrates. It was at this time customary for the British court on the island to follow the jurisprudence of the local communities, ruling for instance in accordance with Malay law. During his superintendency, Caunter faced further unrest from resident traders. He was suspicious especially of the faction of James Scott, the business partner of the late founder of the British settlement in the island, Captain Francis Light. MacDonald had denounced the confluence of mercantile and political interests, writing to the Council in Calcutta about the perceived undue dominance and influence of the mercantile house of Scott & Co.

Caunter took several persons into custody whom he suspected of conspiring to set up a jurisdiction independent of the East India Company, to go on trial when MacDonald returned. Caunter's twins Sarah Sparke and Richard McDonald were born at Government House in March 1798, but his wife Harriett died in labour. Major MacDonald resumed the superintendency on 28 October, but in December illness forced him to leave for Calcutta, where he died the following year. Caunter consequently again became Acting Superintendent in December 1798, relinquishing the position of marine storekeeper and master attendant to Captain John Baird.

=== Acquisition of Province Wellesley ===
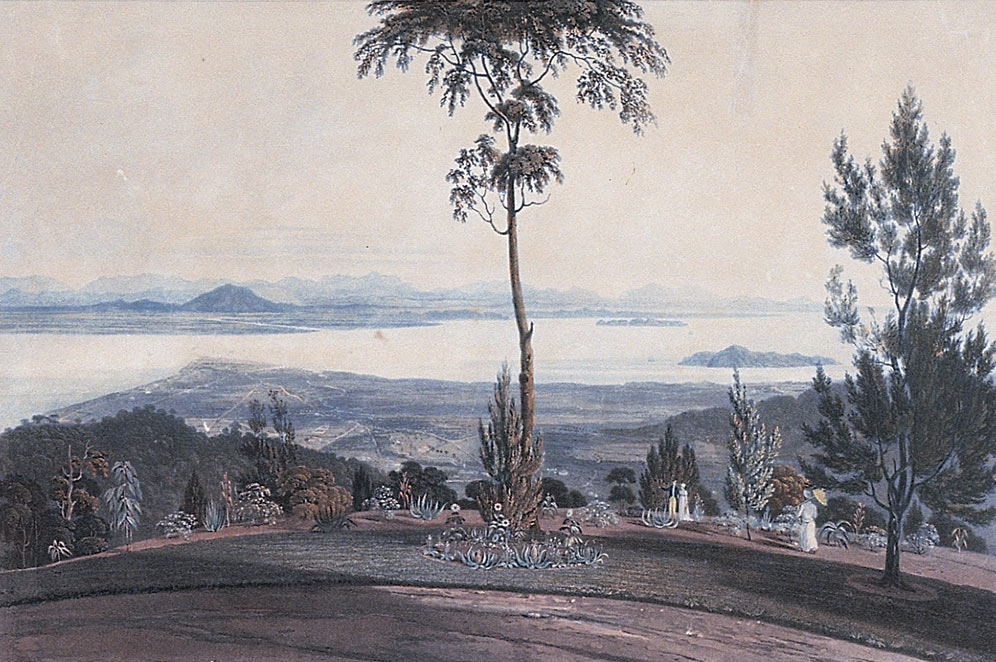
Province Wellesley, acquired for Penang by Caunter in 1800 on behalf of Lieutenant-Governor Leith, seen from George Town in this 1818 drawing. At its narrowest, the strait is three kilometres across.

Caunter's second superintendency lasted until the arrival on 20 April 1800 of Sir George Alexander William Leith. The Governor-General of India, Richard Wellesley, had created Leith Lieutenant-Governor of Prince of Wales Island with a view to bringing greater order and authority to the island's European inhabitants in particular. Caunter was First Assistant in Leith's Government, with Philip Manington Jnr as Second Assistant; in addition, Leith appointed Caunter Lay Chaplain in May 1800.

Security considerations made it desirable for Prince of Wales Island to control a buffer of land on the opposite shore. The French were considered a growing threat; in addition, piracy had become frequent since the growth of the port of George Town, the main settlement on the island. Pirates had their base at the mouth of the Perai River across from George Town. This part of the Malay Peninsula belonged to the Sultanate of Kedah.

Bad blood between the British and the Sultanate had been set, however, when Superintendent Light reneged on his promise of military assistance to Kedah and failed to pay the full annual amount agreed in exchange for the British settlement of Penang. When the Sultan died in 1799 and was succeeded by his brother, Dziaddin Mukarram Shah II, the British sensed an opportunity. Shortly after Caunter handed over the Government of the island to Leith, the latter appointed him to negotiate the cession of a coastal strip of land on the mainland called Seberang Perai.

Caunter travelled to Perlis, the place of residence of the Sultan, or Raja Muda of Perlis and Kedah as he was styled, and conveyed a letter and presents on behalf of Leith. He spoke with the Sultan's confidential adviser on the subject of the land and was soon given to understand that the Sultan was disposed to cede it, but that his ministers were opposed to this. There was a stalemate for several days until it was hinted to Caunter that the ministers and the women of the seraglio required some presents. On inquiry, the sum of 2,000 Spanish dollars (then the international currency) was named and Caunter took it upon himself to promise payment of this amount. All obstacles were then removed.

=== Significance of the Treaty of friendship and alliance ===
The treaty concluded with Kedah, referred to in the treaty text as the Treaty of friendship and alliance, came into effect on 7 July 1800 and brought Province Wellesley under British sovereignty. The treaty, which superseded Francis Light's earlier agreements of 1786 and 1791, provided, in British eyes, an unequivocal basis for the status of Prince of Wales Island and Province Wellesley as British territory. The treaty influenced the East India Company's attitude towards Kedah and Siam, and expanded the resources of Prince of Wales' Isle, the opportunities for, and the sphere of influence of its mainly planting and mercantile inhabitants.

On 8 May 1801 a son of Caunter's, James, was baptised whose mother was recorded as Silvia, likely a non-European, local woman. The infant didn't live, and was buried on the 9th in the Protestant cemetery of George Town. Another son of George Caunter's, William, was also born around 1801.

In February 1803, Caunter applied for compensation on account of expenses incurred by him while engaged as Acting Superintendent during the earlier absence, and, later, the death of Superintendent Forbes Ross MacDonald, stating, "It will not, I hope, be deemed improper in me to observe that in taking charge of the Superintendence of this island, I considered it to be my duty to support the credit and dignity of the station to the best of my ability, and therefore continued to keep a public table for strangers, and to give the usual annual public dinners as had been customary with the Superintendents, and I trust the expenses thereby incurred will not be deemed lavish when the times during the above period, considerable fleets and armaments were in the port and some of them for many weeks at a time."

=== Loss of appointments, stay in England and return to Penang ===
In 1805 Penang was elevated to the status of fourth Presidency of British India, based largely on expectations of its potential as a naval base. Philip Dundas arrived in September as the Presidency's first Governor, along with an expanded administration of 27 officials. The change took residents of Penang by surprise. Caunter, as an official under outgoing Lieutenant Governor Farquhar, lost his appointments as First Assistant, Chaplain and Treasurer. Since his previous government positions he had not carried on any mercantile trade, and he had invested his property in clearance and cultivation on the island. He returned to Britain on the East Indiaman Warley in 1806 to plead his case personally with the East India Company's Board of Directors, offering his services as Superintendent of Police and Magistrate in Penang. Although he wasn't a covenanted civil servant as was generally preferred, the following year the EIC recommended him for these positions.

At the end of 1806 Caunter, staying in the parish of St Ann Blackfriars, London, and recorded as being a widower, married Lucy Ellicott, a spinster from Cullompton, Devon, the sister of Captain Edward Ellicott of the Royal Navy. They set off for Penang in 1807–8. According to Caunter Family Records, Mrs Caunter and a young child she had borne died on the voyage and were buried in Madeira. In Penang, Caunter was additionally appointed chief commissioner of the court of small debts (on which he sat with Stamford Raffles) (1809), chairman of the committee of assessors (1809) and Acting Chaplain (1810).

== Death ==
In June 1811 Caunter, then the Police Magistrate, first commissioner of the Court of Requests and Acting Chaplain of Penang, applied for sick leave. His doctor recommended that he be sent to the convalescent bungalow on Penang Hill for recuperation. On 24 November Acting Governor Phillips granted Caunter, who had been exercising his functions, permission to travel to Calcutta for the recovery of his health, and to absent himself from the island for a period of four months.

At the end of January 1812 Caunter was still away on temporary leave as far as the Penang authorities in Fort Cornwallis were aware, but a letter of 18 April referred to Caunter "having departed this life on the 25th December last". His son Hobart a few years later referred to his father having found his final resting place in the ocean, "Just as prepar'd to cross the homeward wave". Frederick Lyde Caunter, in Caunter Family History (1930), wrote: "one day when cruising among the islands in his yacht, he was missed and was supposed to have been drowned, though it was rumoured that he was murdered at sea."

== Intangible heritage ==
Caunter played an important role in encouraging planting of spices, particularly nutmeg, on the island. In 1798, as Acting Superintendent he wrote, "A very large quantity of nutmeg and clove plants have been offered to me by the Captain of the Surprise, on the Honorable Company's account, on the same terms as had been paid by the Bencoolen Government for plants imported into that settlement, but having no instructions on that head, I declined taking them. Those plants are now, I understand, to be offered to public sale, which will, I presume, answer the views of Government equally well with purchasing them on the Company's account, as it matters not by whom, so that they are propagated on the island. — About six hundred nutmeg plants belonging to the Company are now in a very thriving way, but the clove plant appears to be difficult to rear, there being not above half a dozen alive of those sent here by the Company's botanist." The Surprise was a British brig that arrived a few days earlier from the Moluccas with five slaves sent over by the Resident at Banda, R. T. Townsend, to look after those nutmeg plants at Penang.

In March 1802, Lieutenant-Governor Leith wrote, "The clove tree at present seems to thrive better in the Honorable Company's garden than the nutmeg, but on the other hand, the nutmeg tree, in some of the gentlemen's gardens, is the most promising; it is therefore, I think fair to conclude that the plants will succeed in different parts of the island; the nutmeg grows slowly till it attains the height of 4 feet, when it advances more rapidly; till this year, it was uncertain whether the nutmeg tree would produce fruit, I have now the satisfaction to say, this doubt is removed, as there is a fine nutmeg on a tree belonging to Mr. Caunter, and many more in his grounds in blossom." Leith pointed out that Captain Francis Light was the first to introduce cinnamon, clove and nutmeg trees from Mauritius to the island, 'procured at great expense,' but notes that the clove and nutmeg trees died shortly after. Leith noted that there were 500 nutmeg trees between 3 and 10 years of age, at Caunter's estate, a few of the 10-year-olds, being between 7 and 9 feet and in bloom. Also on Caunter's estate were 40 clove plants between 3 and 4 feet high. Light died on 25 October 1794. It seems reasonable, therefore, that the tree that produced the fruit, that Leith referred to, and the others that were in blossom, may have been the ones Caunter obtained from the subsequent sale of the ones that arrived from the Moluccas aboard the Surprise, in 1798, four years after Light's demise and four years before Leith's letter.

In April 1802, William Hunter (1755–1812), the East India Company's botanist, wrote that he had arrived at Penang with the mission to determine the state of the company's spice plantation on the island. In May 1803, Hunter wrote from Calcutta to the Governor-General of India, "Besides the extensive plantation belonging to the Honourable Company, several thousand trees are now on the estates of individuals, both European and Chinese. One nut was produced last year on Mr. Caunter's ground, by a tree, which including its growth before transplantation may be about ten years old. Though plucked before it was ripe, it had the true aroma of the best kind." Attached to this letter is a treatise on, "Plants of Prince of Wales Island," which remained unpublished till 1909. He did, however, publish a similar paper, entitled, "An account of the cultivation of Pepper on Prince of Wales Island," which was published in the Asiatic Researches Vol. iX, 1809, a hundred years earlier. The 1909 publication of his work was edited by H. N. Ridley. The folio manuscript, from which this work was drawn, was entitled "Outline of a Flora of Prince of Wales's Island ... Noble Marquis Wellesley, Governor General," by Dr. William Hunter (1755–1812), and dated from "Calcutta, 18th May, 1803." It was preserved at the Department of Botany.

Ridley later noted, "The Court of Directors in 1803 desired that every encouragement should be given to the Penang spice planters, as Dr. Roxburgh had in the previous year expressed his opinion that this was "the most eligible spot of all the East India Company's possession for spice cultivation." All this from that first nutmeg on Caunter's tree.

The minutes of an 1807 Road Committee meeting record the proposal to lay a road from Dato Kramat Kampong into the Ayer Itam valley. This is Dato Kramat Road of today. The first part of that road, "between Suffolk and Mr. Caunter's ground," was described as "marked out, but not yet made." Captain Light's large pepper estate, Suffolk, lay immediately north of Caunter's extensive plantation (Jelutong of today).

Caunter had built a house on his estate but his house did not survive the way Suffolk House did. His memory was, up until 15 December 2008, kept alive in the area in George Town known as Caunter Hall. Its principal thoroughfare, Caunter Hall Road, was thereafter renamed Jalan P. Ramlee. Lengkok Caunter (Caunter Crescent), a smaller road, still exists.
