= Antoine Bestel =

French lawyer and colonial politician

Nicolas Louis Antoine Bestel
- Born: 1766; Sedan, France
- Died: November 18, 1852 (aged 85–86); Pamplemousses, Mauritius
- Occupations: lawyer, politician
- Spouse: Louise Magdeleine Chenu du Clos
- Children: 11

Nicolas Louis Antoine Bestel (1766 – 18 November 1852) was a French lawyer and colonial politician. Arriving in the French colony of Isle de France (now Mauritius) as a young prosecutor, he took a prominent part in the island's administration at the time of the French Revolution and remained active in public affairs under British rule.

== Early life ==
Bestel was born in the northern French town of Sedan to Nicolas Bestel, a locksmith, and his wife Marie Elizabeth Liébault. For several years he worked for a prosecutors' office at the Parlement of Paris. He was sent to the Isle of Bourbon (present-day Réunion) in the Indian Ocean to assist with a trade-related legal case. From there he went to the Isle de France in 1791 and worked in the law office of François Fressanges, who was also the mayor of the island's capital, Port Louis. In the same year Bestel was appointed court prosecutor.

In 1792 he married Louise Magdeleine Chenu, the daughter of a sea captain from Brittany. He became involved in the political structures set up in the Isle de France in the wake of the French Revolution. He was secretary of the Assemblée Coloniale, in which the colonists had political representation, as well as being a member of the Comité de Sûreté, the police agency. In January 1800 he was part of a delegation that went with the island's governor, Malartic, to the sister island of Réunion - the new name for Bourbon - to suppress a Royalist attempt to declare independence and call in the help of the British.

== Political activities in British Mauritius ==
After the capture of the Isle de France by the British in 1810 as part of the Napoleonic Wars, Bestel remained active in public affairs as a notable of the district of Grand Port. He participated in the re-establishment of the conseils de fabrique, state vehicles for administering church funds, in 1815. He also selected members for the conseil de commune, the district-based advisory body to the government, and was himself appointed a member by Governor Farquhar.

Bestel took part in the sitting of the Conseil Général des Communes on 14 February 1820 which debated the accusation by General Darling, commander of the British troops in Mauritius, that the island's colonists persisted in the slave trade. This trade had been made illegal everywhere in the British Empire by the Slave Trade Act 1807. Following the Conseil's sharp protest to the governor, Darling suspended the conseils de commune. In 1827 the colonists created an unofficial committee, the Comité Colonial, of which Bestel became a member.

In 1832 Governor Colville appointed Bestel to the Conseil législatif, another body through which the colonists represented their interests to the British administration, as the member for Grand Port. Bestel voted in favour of the dismissal of public prosecutor John Jeremie, reviled among the colonists for being an anti-slavery campaigner, who had sought to abolish slavery in the island without financial compensation for the sugar plantation owners.

On 6 December 1832 Bestel presented to the Comité Colonial a proposal for the emancipation of slaves that was well received; he submitted his proposal to the Conseil législatif on 18 June 1833. In that year he stepped down from the Conseil in protest against an ordinance that sought to tighten government control of the press, when a measure of press freedom had only been obtained the previous year. The ordinance was, in the event, allowed to lapse. Following successful representations to the British government by Franco-Mauritian lawyer Adrien d'Épinay, also a member of the Conseil législatif, the plantation owners received compensation when slavery was abolished in Mauritius on 1 February 1835.

Bestel was a large landed proprietor and slave-owner, owning the estates La Plaine St Martin in Grand Port and L'hermitage in Plaines Wilhems. In July 1836 he received at least £3,763 from the British colonial government as compensation for the liberation of his 122 slaves. Due to speculation he lost a considerable amount of money earned earlier by supplying the troops in Mauritius. In the last two years of his life he turned to the Catholic faith.

== Family ==
Antoine Bestel and Louise Magdeleine Chenu du Clos (1776-1854) had eleven children. Their son Nicolas Gustave Bestel, Esq. (1802-1887) was Second Puisne Judge, later acting Chief Judge and Commissary of Justice, of the Supreme Court of Mauritius. Their daughter Aurélie Marie Elisabeth Bestel (1795–1855) married George Henry Caunter, Esq., who became Judge of the Vice-Admiralty Court.
