= Lord Wood =

Lord Wood may refer to:

- Alexander Wood, Lord Wood (1788–1864), Scottish lawyer
- Stewart Wood, Baron Wood of Anfield (born 1968), Labour life peer

== See also ==
- Lord's Wood (disambiguation)
