= Forbes Ross MacDonald =

British colonial administrator (died 1799)

Major Forbes Ross MacDonald (died 1799), a gentleman in the service of the Nabob of Arcot, was appointed by Governor-general Sir John Shore as superintendent of Prince of Wales Isle to succeed Philip Manington who had resigned due to ill health.

MacDonald served from 14 May 1795 to 1799. MacDonald's tour of duty was not a happy one as he was in conflict with the merchants and his own civil servants. This led to his resignation and return to Madras. He died in Madras in May 1799.

Although Macdonald did not get along with many people, he nevertheless made his mark with the many transformational improvements he made during his term in office including the construction of the Customs House, Hospital, and Prison. He widened streets and built a new road from town, at the coast, right into the interior of the isle. He ensured that streets and roads in town were clearly marked and had them extended to sixty-five feet wide. He organised the road system so that street intersections were at right angles.

Macdonald was trusted and held in high regard by his superiors and had been given supervision of the military force that seized Malacca in 1795.

Upon his departure, George Caunter once again took charge as Acting Superintendent as he had done before in 1779 when MacDonald went on leave, and continued until the arrival of Sir George Alexander William Leith in 1800.
