= Lord's Wood, Dittisham =

Protected area in Devon, England

Coordinates: 50.374150°N 3.5876333°W

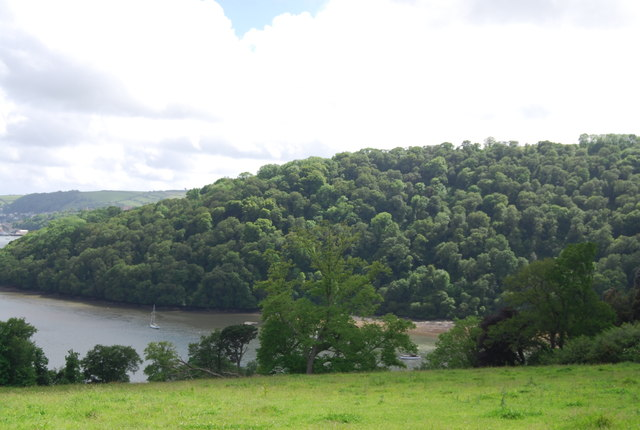
Lord's Wood

Lord's Wood is a Site of Special Scientific Interest (SSSI) within the South Devon National Landscape in Devon, England. It is located 2km north of the town of Dartmouth on the banks of the River Dart near the village of Dittisham. This woodland is protected as it is an excellent example of oak-hazel-ash woodland.

== Biology ==
Tree species in this woodland include sessile oak, pedunculate oak, ash and silver birch. Shrub species include hazel and holly. Herbaceous plant species include woodruff, sanicle, yellow archangel, wood spurge, goldenrod, wood violet, opposite-leaved golden-saxifrage, butcher's broom and wild madder. Fern species in this woodland include male fern, broad buckler-fern and narrow buckler-fern.

The shoreline of the River Dart near Lord's Wood has been used to farm Pacific oysters.

== Geology ==
Rocks underlying this protected area are shales and slates of Devonian age that give rise to freely-draining, and acid, clay loam soils.

== Land ownership ==
All land within Lord's Wood SSSI is owned by the family of Sir John Edward Victor Rose.
