= Raid on Batavia (1806) =

1806 raid of the Java campaign of 1806–1807

- Part of the Java campaign of 1806–1807
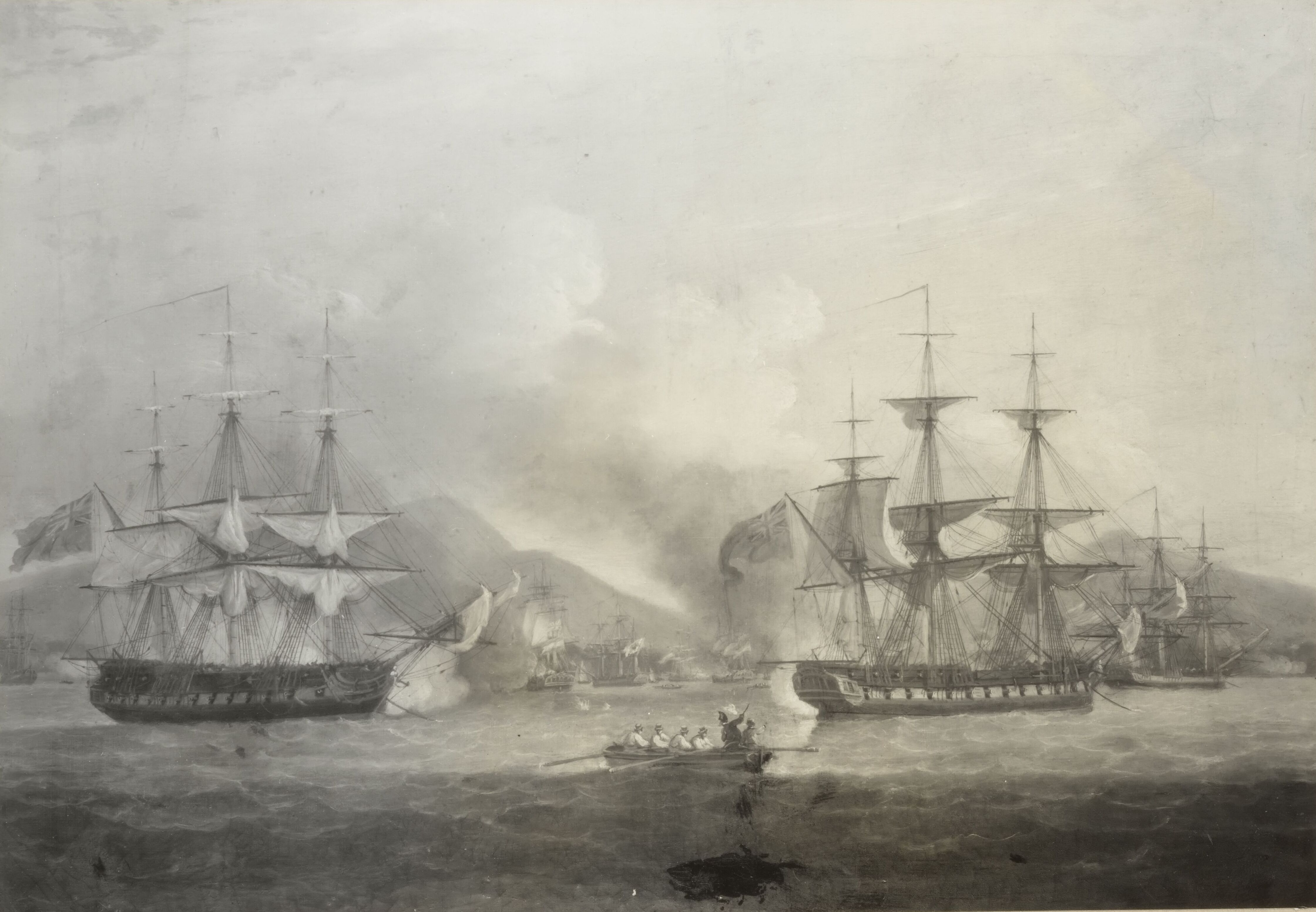
- 1824 painting of the raid
Date	27 November 1806
Location	Batavia, Dutch East Indies
Result	British victory

Belligerents
United Kingdom	Kingdom of Holland; Dutch East Indies

Commanders and leaders
Edward Pellew	F. W. C. van de Sande

Strength
4 ships of the line 2 frigates 1 brig	1 frigate 1 corvette 6 brigs 22 merchant ships 1 gun battery

Casualties and losses
1 killed 4 wounded	1 frigate destroyed 1 corvette captured 6 brigs destroyed 20 merchant ships destroyed 2 merchant ships captured

The raid on Batavia was a successful attempt by a large Royal Navy force to destroy the Dutch navy squadron based in Java on 27 November 1806 during the Java campaign of 1806–1807. The British Commander-in-Chief, East Indies, Rear-Admiral Sir Edward Pellew, led a force of four ships of the line, two frigates and brig to the capital of Java at Batavia (later renamed Jakarta), in search of the squadron, which posed a threat to British shipping in the Straits of Malacca and was reported to consist of a number of ships of the line and several smaller vessels.

Eventually, the British discovered the Dutch ships of the line had already sailed eastwards towards Griessie over a month earlier, and Pellew only discovered the frigate Phoenix and six smaller warships in the bay, all of which were driven ashore by their crews to avoid engaging Pellew's force. The wrecks were subsequently burnt and Pellew, unaware of the whereabouts of the main Dutch squadron, returned to his base at Madras for the winter. The raid was the third of series of actions intended to eliminate the threat the Dutch squadron posed to British trade.

The raid reduced the effectiveness of Batavia as a Dutch base, but the continued presence of the main Dutch squadron at Griessie concerned Pellew and he led a second operation the following year to complete his defeat of the Dutch. Three years later, with the French driven out of the western Indian Ocean, British forces in the region were strong enough to prepare an expeditionary force against the Dutch East Indies, which effectively ended the war in the east.

== Background ==
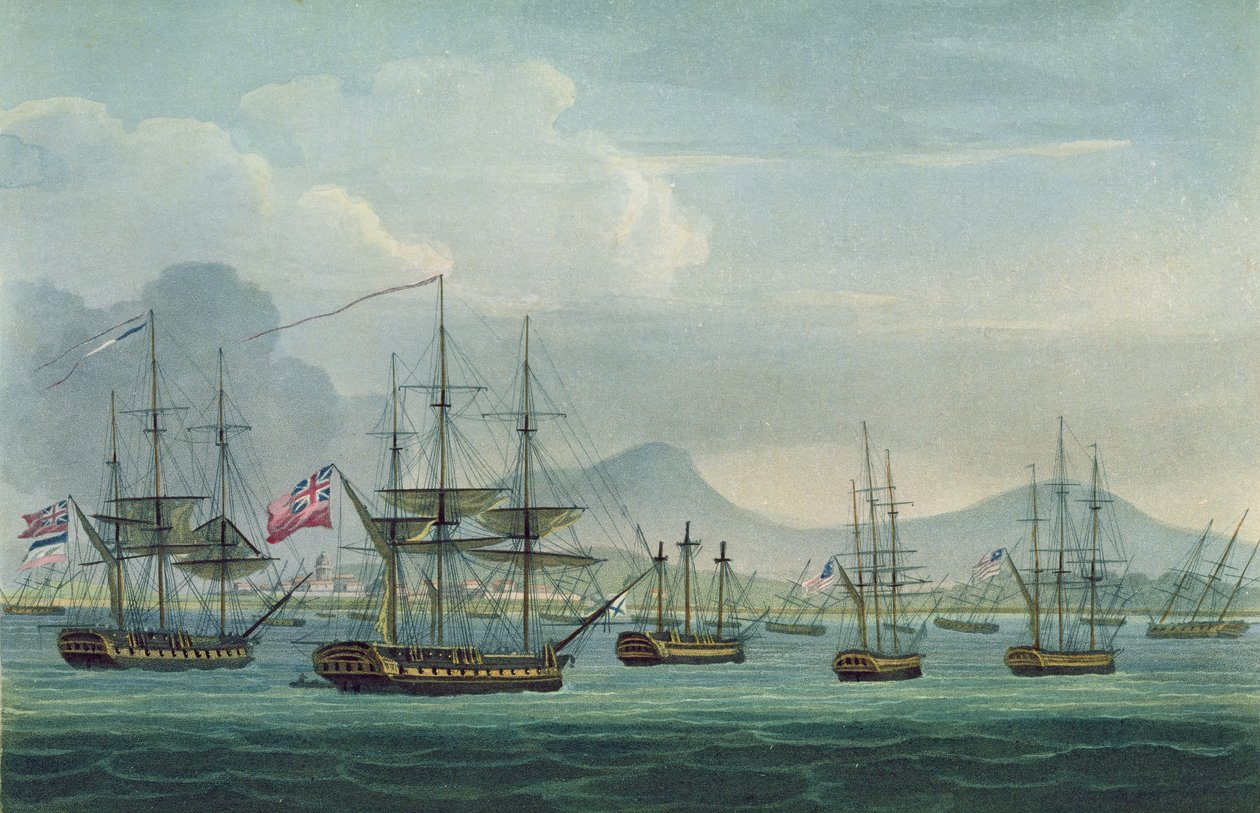
The action of 18 October 1806, which preceded the raid on Batavia

In early 1806, Pellew was relieved by the news that a large French squadron under Rear-Admiral Charles Linois had sailed out of the Indian Ocean and into the Atlantic. The departure of Linois after three years of operations in eastern waters freed Pellew's small squadron based at Madras for operations against the Dutch East Indies. Pellew's particular target was the island of Java, where the principal Dutch navy squadron and its base at Batavia were located. The Dutch Kingdom of Holland was a French client state under Emperor Napoleon's brother Louis Bonaparte and Batavia had been used by Linois in his preparations for the Battle of Pulo Aura, in which a valuable British convoy came under attack, and its position close to the Straits of Malacca threatened British trade with China.

Pellew's departure for the East Indies was delayed by the Vellore Mutiny in the spring, and instead he sent frigates to reconnoitre the situation of the Dutch forces in the region. In July, HMS Greyhound under Captain Edward Elphinstone cruised in the Molucca Islands and captured a Dutch convoy at the action of 26 July 1806 off Celebes. Three months later another frigate, HMS Caroline under Captain Peter Rainier, cruised successfully in the Java Sea and managed to capture a Dutch frigate at the action of 18 October 1806 from the entrance to Batavia harbour. Shortly before Rainier's engagement, the principal ships of the Dutch squadron, the two ships of the line Pluto and Revolutie, had sailed westwards towards the port of Griessie, Vice-Admiral Pieter Hartsinck seeking to divide his forces in preparation for the coming British attack to prevent their complete destruction.

Pellew sailed from Madras in the early autumn of 1806, expecting the full Dutch squadron to be present and preparing accordingly with the ship of the line HMS Culloden under Captain Christopher Cole as his flagship, accompanied by HMS Powerful under Captain Robert Plampin, HMS Russell under Captain Thomas Gordon Caulfield and HMS Belliqueux under Captain George Byng. The ships of the line were accompanied by the frigate HMS Terpsichore under Captain Fleetwood Pellew, Pellew's son, as well as the brig HMS Seaflower under Lieutenant William Fitzwilliam Owen.

== Battle ==
By 23 November, Pellew's squadron was approaching the Sunda Strait from the southwest when he encountered the British frigate HMS Sir Francis Drake, which he attached to his force. Three days later, the squadron passed the port of Bantam and seized the Dutch brig Maria Wilhelmina, continuing on to Batavia during the night. At the approaches to the port, the squadron separated, with the frigates and brig passing between Onrust Island and the shore while the ships of the line took a longer route through deeper water. Although Terpsichore was able to surprise and capture the Dutch corvette William near Onrust Island, the main body of the squadron was spotted by Dutch lookouts from a distance, who initially mistook the approaching vessels for a French squadron. The Dutch officers, led by Captain F. W. C. van de Sande on the frigate Phoenix, decided that resistance against such a large British squadron was useless: the only warships remaining in the harbour were the Phoenix and six small armed ships, none of which could contend with the approaching British force. In an effort to dissuade the British from pressing their attack, the Dutch captains all drove their vessels ashore, joined by the 22 merchant vessels that were anchored in the harbour. (Note: Phoenix, of 32 guns, had been launched at Rotterdam on 4 May 1799.)

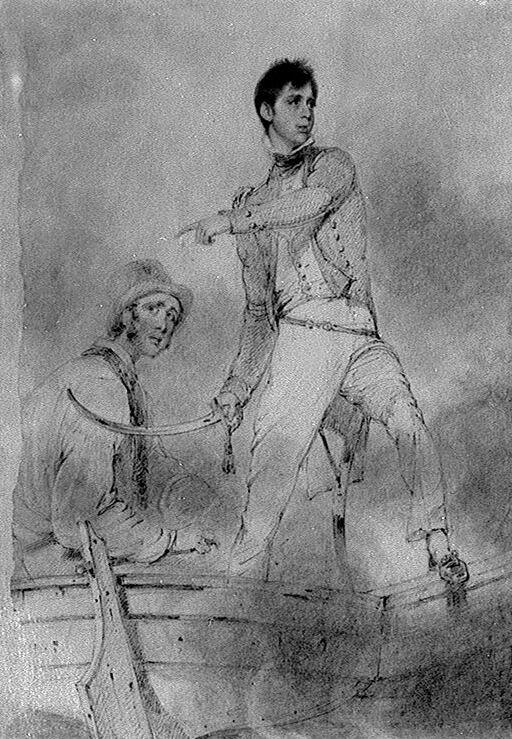
Illustration of Fleetwood Pellew (right) during the raid

Determined to prevent the Dutch from refloating the grounded ships, Pellew ordered landing parties to assemble in the boats of his squadron alongside Terpsichore. From there, under distant covering fire from the British frigates, Fleetwood Pellew led the boats against Phoenix, coming under fire from the grounded vessels and gun batteries ashore. Passing through the bombardment from the shoreline, Pellew's men boarded Phoenix to find that the Dutch crew had just abandoned the vessel, scuttling the frigate as they departed. Although now useless as a ship, Phoenix's guns were turned on the other beached vessels to cover the British boats as they spread out to board and burn them. This operation was followed by the destruction of 20 grounded merchant ships in the harbour, although two others were successfully refloated and captured. In a final act before withdrawing to the squadron offshore, Captain Pellew set fire to the wreck of Phoenix, burning the ship to the waterline. The entire operation was conducted under heavy fire from the shore, but British casualties were only one Royal Marine killed and three men wounded.

Without sufficient troops to attempt a landing at Batavia itself, Pellew withdrew from the harbour. Preparing his prizes for the return to Madras, he ordered all prisoners taken from the captured and burnt ships returned to shore under condition of parole. The captured William was found to be in such a poor state of repair that it was not worth keeping the corvette and Pellew ordered the ship burnt. (Note: William was a brig that the Batavians had captured from the British in 1799.) Pellew noted in his official report that Lieutenant Owen, who as senior lieutenant would otherwise have been placed in command, should be recompensed with another command as reward for his services in the engagement. With his preparations complete, Pellew then ordered his squadron to disperse, Culloden sailing to Malacca.

== Aftermath ==
The British raid on Batavia had destroyed 28 vessels. In addition to Phoenix, William and the merchant ships, Pellew's squadron had burnt the 18-gun brigs Avonturier and Patriot, the 14-gun Zee-Ploeg, the 10-gun Arnistein, the 8-gun Johanna Suzanna and the 6-gun Snelheid. Just three ships were captured: two merchant vessels and Maria Wilhelmina. The elimination of the smaller vessels of the Dutch squadron was an important victory for Pellew, leaving only the larger ships of the line at large. These ships were old and in poor condition, limiting the threat they posed to British trade routes. Nevertheless, Pellew returned to the Java Sea in 1807 in search of the warships, destroying them at the Raid on Griessie in November, a year after the success at Batavia. A lack of resources in the region and the threat posed by the French Indian Ocean island bases delayed larger scale British operations against the East Indies until 1810, when a series of invasions rapidly eliminated the remaining Dutch presence in the Pacific.
