= Action of 18 October 1806 =

1806 naval battle of the Java campaign of 1806–1807

- Part of the Java campaign of 1806–1807
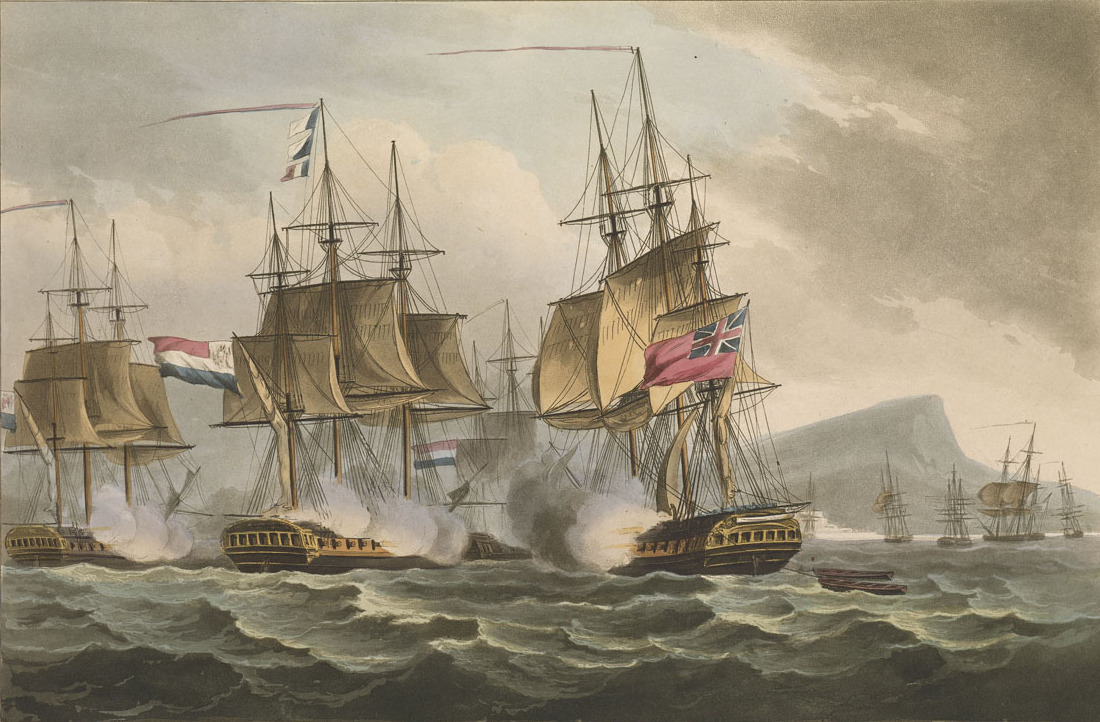
- Capture of the Maria Riggersbergen, Octr. 18th 1806; Thomas Whitcombe, 1817
Date	18 October 1806
Location	Off Batavia, Java Sea
Result	British victory

Belligerents
United Kingdom	Kingdom of Holland

Commanders and leaders
Peter Rainier	Claas Jager (surrendered)

Strength
1 frigate	1 frigate 1 corvette 3 brigs

Casualties and losses
9 killed 12 wounded	50 killed and wounded 1 frigate captured 1 brig captured

The action of 18 October 1806 was a naval engagement of the Java campaign of 1806–1807 fought between the Royal Navy frigate Caroline and a Dutch navy squadron near the entrance to the city harbour of Batavia in the Dutch East Indies. During the battle, the Dutch frigate Maria Riggersbergen was left unsupported by the remainder of the squadron and, isolated, was forced to strike her colours. (Note: There are a variety of ways in which Maria Riggersbergen has been spelt, including Maria Reygersbergen, Maria Reigersbergen, Maria Reijersbergen, and Maria Reijgersbergen. The most commonly used name in English however, is Maria Riggersbergen.) Captain Peter Rainier, the British commander, was subsequently free to remove his prize from within sight of the Dutch port when the remainder of the Dutch squadron refused to engage Caroline and their crews deliberately grounded the ships to avoid capture. He also returned many prisoners taken previously in a captured brig.

Along with the earlier action of 26 July 1806, the battle demonstrated the weakness of the Dutch squadron in the East Indies and convinced British Rear-Admiral Sir Edward Pellew to lead an operation against Batavia to eliminate the remainder of the squadron in November 1806. This second raid was only partially successful, and was followed a year later by a raid on Griessie, in which the last Dutch warships in the East Indies were eliminated.

== Background ==
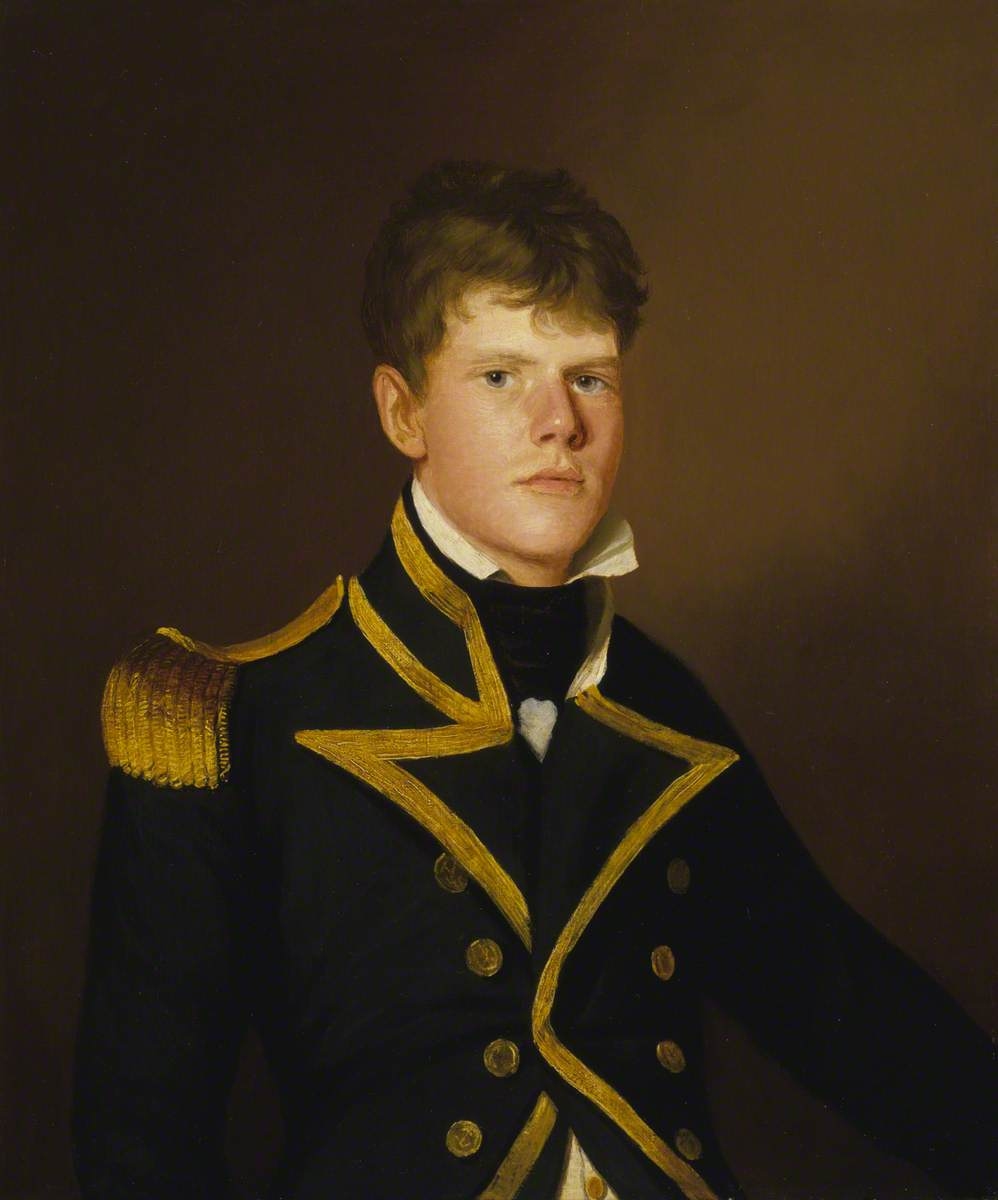
1806 portrait of Peter Rainier

By 1806, the French squadron under Rear-Admiral Charles Linois departed for the Atlantic Ocean and a British expeditionary force captured the Cape of Good Hope. Rear-Admiral Sir Edward Pellew, commander of the Royal Navy in the eastern half of the Indian Ocean at Madras, was now able to concentrate on a major threat to British shipping in the region: the Dutch navy squadron based in the Dutch East Indies, specifically on Java at the port of Batavia.

The Dutch squadron, which consisted of three old ships of the line, three frigates and a number of smaller warships, was primarily an anti-piracy force. However, their presence so close to the Straits of Malacca, a major British trade route, was of concern to Pellew, particularly following the Battle of Pulo Aura in 1804, when Linois's squadron intercepted a vital British convoy in the Strait, using Batavia both as a base to launch the operation and repair damage afterwards. Determined to eliminate the Dutch squadron, Pellew despatched frigates to the region in the spring of 1806, under orders to disrupt trade and reconnoitre the Dutch harbours and bases. In July 1806, the frigate HMS Greyhound cruised the Molucca Islands, and captured a Dutch frigate and convoy at the action of 26 July 1806 off Celebes, encouraging further expeditions.

In October 1806, a second frigate, the 36-gun HMS Caroline under Captain Peter Rainier (nephew of Admiral Peter Rainier whom Pellew had replaced), cruised in the Java Sea. Caroline had a successful start to the operation, discovering that the Dutch ships of the line had left Batavia harbour and sailed eastwards. He had also captured a number of Dutch ships so that by mid-October 57 of Rainier's crew, more than a fifth, were aboard prizes on the journey back to India, leaving Caroline with just 204 men and a large number of prisoners carried below decks.

== Battle ==
On 18 October, Rainier was cruising in the Java Sea when he encountered and captured a small Dutch brig sailing from Bantam. From prisoners removed from this ship, Rainier learned that the Dutch frigate Phoenix was undergoing repairs at the small island of Onrust in the Thousand Islands. Deciding that Phoenix was lying in an exposed position and could be easily attacked, Rainier sailed Caroline towards Onrust, but was spotted in the passage between Middlebey and Amsterdam Islands by two small Dutch warships. Rainier attacked the small vessels, seizing the 14-gun brig Zeerop without a shot fired. The other vessel Zee-Ploeg escaped into shallow coastal waters, where the deeper drafted frigate could not follow. The delay allowed Phoenix to sail to Batavia ahead of Caroline's pursuit.

As Caroline neared Batavia, Phoenix entered the well-defended harbour, making further pursuit impossible. However, Rainier then sighted a second frigate, lying at anchor in Batavia Roads, accompanied only by the 24-gun corvette William, the elusive brig Zee-Ploeg, and the 18-gun ship Patriot that formerly belonged to the Dutch East India Company. Prisoners from Zeerop identified this ship as the 36-gun Maria Riggersbergen under Captain Claas Jager. Although this force was significantly stronger than Caroline, and could call on the support of approximately 30 gunboats anchored closer inshore, Rainier immediately gave orders to advance on the Dutch frigate. In his preparations for battle, Rainier ordered that springs be placed on his anchor cables, giving his ship the ability to easily turn at anchor to face new threats once engaged with Maria Riggersbergen.

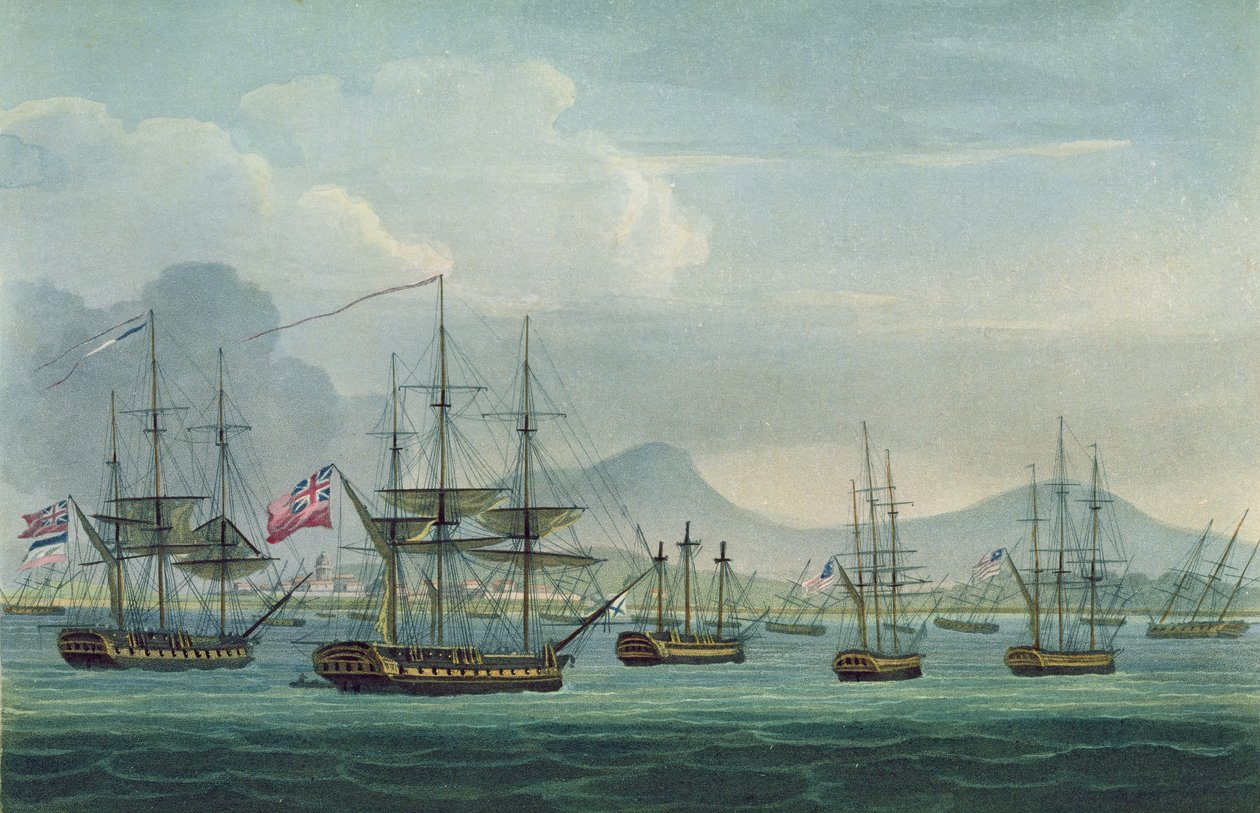
Illustration of the battle by Thomas Whitcombe

As Caroline approached, Jager ordered his crew to open fire on the British frigate at extreme range, along with calling for support from the other Dutch vessels anchored nearby. In response, Rainier gave orders for his men to hold their fire, enduring the Dutch attacks until his frigate was just 40 yards (37 m) away before unleashing a full broadside. The Dutch ship responded in kind, but the British fire proved too strong and within half an hour she struck her colours. Taking possession of Maria Riggersbergen, Lieutenant Lemage discovered that 50 of the 270 men aboard had been killed or wounded and that the ship had suffered moderate damage to its masts and rigging. British casualties in the engagement were three killed outright and eighteen more wounded, six of whom subsequently died. Also killed were four Dutch prisoners who had been sheltering in the hold.

While Lemage was boarding Maria Riggersbergen, Rainier had turned his attention to the other ships in the bay. However the sea was shallow and crossed by shoals that prevented further advance without proper charts, which Caroline lacked. Although they had fired a number of shots at long range, the interference by the smaller Dutch vessels during the battle had been negligible. Following the surrender of Maria Riggersbergen, most of the shipping in the bay including all seven of the merchant vessels, the three small warships and Phoenix, had deliberately beached themselves to avoid capture. Abandoning the idea of further operations off Batavia as too risky, Rainier ordered his ships to sail, placing most of the Dutch prisoners, including the wounded and sick, into the first brig captured that morning and ordering the ship to return to Batavia as a cartel, with the officers placed under parole restrictions. With most of his prisoners removed, Rainier then ordered Maria Riggersbergen and Zeerop to return to Madras.

== Aftermath ==
Rainier's action against what appeared to be superior power and numbers exposed the poor quality of the Dutch squadron at Batavia. Pellew determined to make a decisive attack on the capital of the Dutch East Indies during 1806. In November he led a powerful squadron to the harbour, once again forcing the Dutch to their squadron ashore, where it was burnt by boarding parties led by Admiral Pellew's son, Captain Fleetwood Pellew. The following year, Admiral Pellew returned in search of the missing ships of the line, discovering them at Griessie and causing the Dutch to destroy them too. With the Dutch squadron eliminated, the threat to British trade routes was removed and attention returned to the French bases in the Indian Ocean, the British waiting until 1811 to force the surrender of the remaining Dutch colonies in the East Indies.

Maria Riggersbergen was commissioned into the Royal Navy as HMS Java, under Captain George Pigot. In his report after the battle, Rainier described the Dutch frigate as "launched in 1800 and is a fast sailing ship". The 2,500 nautical miles (4,600 km) journey to Madras had revealed that she was in fact much older and very unstable at sea. Java and all hands disappeared six months later in a February 1807 hurricane in the west Indian Ocean while in convoy with the flagship of Sir Thomas Troubridge, HMS Blenheim, during a hurricane in the western Indian Ocean. Rainier remained in the Pacific for some time, capturing the valuable Spanish treasure ship San Rafael in January 1807, but ultimately his career stalled on his return to Europe.

== Bibliography ==
- Clowes, William Laird (1997) [1900]. The Royal Navy, A History from the Earliest Times to 1900, Volume V. Chatham Publishing. ISBN 1-86176-014-0.
- Gardiner, Robert, ed. (2001) [1998]. The Victory of Seapower. Caxton Editions. ISBN 1-84067-359-1.
- Grocott, Terence (2002) [1997]. Shipwrecks of the Revolutionary & Napoleonic Era. Caxton Editions. ISBN 1-84067-164-5.
- Henderson CBE, James (1994) [1970]. The Frigates. Leo Cooper. ISBN 0-85052-432-6.
- James, William (2002) [1827]. The Naval History of Great Britain, Volume 4, 1805–1807. Conway Maritime Press. ISBN 0-85177-908-5.
- Woodman, Richard (2001). The Sea Warriors. Constable Publishers. ISBN 1-84119-183-3.
