= Java campaign of 1806–1807 =

Military campaign of the Napoleonic Wars

- Part of the Napoleonic Wars
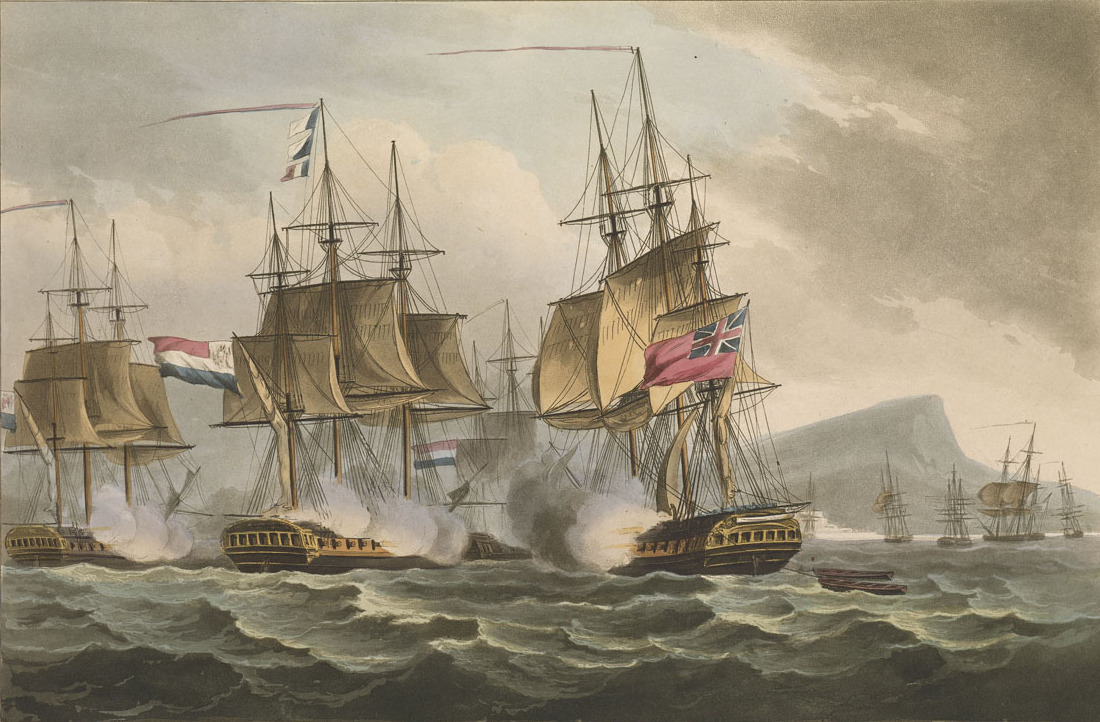
- Capture of the Maria Riggersbergen, Octr. 18th 1806; Thomas Whitcombe, 1817
Date	June 1806 – 11 December 1807
Location	Java, Dutch East Indies
Result	British victory

Belligerents
United Kingdom	Kingdom of Holland; Dutch East Indies

Commanders and leaders
Edward Pellew	Pieter Hartsinck

The Java campaign of 1806–1807 was a military campaign of the Napoleonic Wars in which the Royal Navy destroyed a squadron of the navy of the Kingdom of Holland based on Java. In 1806, Rear-admiral Sir Edward Pellew determined that the Dutch squadron, consisting of three ships of the line and several smaller warships under Vice-admiral Pieter Hartsinck, posed a potential threat to British merchant shipping passing through the Strait of Malacca. As Pellew lacked the strength to invade Java outright, he instead established a blockade of the Dutch East Indies' capital of Batavia and made preparations to engage in targeted naval strikes to isolate and destroy Hartsinck's squadron.

Although he was delayed by inadequate resources and the Vellore Mutiny, Pellew sent the frigate HMS Greyhound to the Java Sea in July 1806. There, she destroyed a Dutch convoy near Celebes on 26 July. Nearly three months later, another British frigate, HMS Caroline, captured a Dutch frigate and brig on 18 October off Batavia. Building on this momentum, Pellew brought his main force to the region and on 27 November raided Batavia, destroying the last frigate and several smaller warships of Hartsinck's squadron. As the three ships of the line had escaped to Griessie prior to the raid, Pellew returned in October 1807. His forces raided Griessie in early December, during which all three ships of the line were scuttled.

The destruction of Hartsinck's squadron led to the collapse of Dutch naval power in the region and secured Britain's command of the sea across the western Pacific and eastern Indian Ocean, ensuring safe passage for British merchant shipping. With the Dutch no longer a threat to British mercantile interests in the East Indies, Britain's attention turned to the two remaining French colonies in the Indian Ocean, Isle de France and Isle Bonaparte. In the Mauritius campaign of 1809–1811, both colonies were occupied by British forces, ending the threat from European rivals to Britain's interests in the region.

== Background ==
In the beginning of 1806, control of the Indian Ocean in the Napoleonic Wars was disputed. The First French Empire and its Dutch client state, the Batavian Commonwealth (which became the Kingdom of Holland in mid-1806), held significant naval bases in the region, from which their warships could operate against British interests. The French colonies of Isle de France and Isle Bonaparte dominated the central Indian Ocean, allowing allied raiders to cruise British trade routes and attack isolated convoys, while the Dutch Cape Colony and Dutch East Indies controlled the points of entry to the ocean from east and west, with squadron being based at both colonies. The British, whose bases in India gave them control of the Northern Indian Ocean, were able to obtain supplies and reinforcements from Europe more easily than their enemies, as the Royal Navy was already dominant in European waters, but British forces in the region were still insufficient to make a significant impact on the French and Dutch territories. Control of the Indian Ocean was essential for the British war effort, because the British economy relied heavily on trade with the holdings of the Honourable East India Company in India and with other ports in the east, particularly in China.

In 1803 at the outbreak of the Napoleonic Wars, a French squadron under Counter-admiral Charles Linois was already operating in the Indian Ocean against British commerce, initially based at Isle de France. Linois's principal target was the China Fleet, a large annual convoy of valuable East Indiamen merchant ships and smaller "country ships" that sailed from Canton early in the year and crossed the Indian Ocean to the Cape of Good Hope, then passing northwards to Europe. In 1804, this convoy was worth over £8 million and included 29 ships which—due to the sudden news of the outbreak of war—were entirely unprotected by the Royal Navy during the first leg of its journey across the South China Sea. Although Linois was not aware of the weakness of the convoy's defences, he knew of its importance and value and determined to intercept it, using Batavia on the island of Java as his main base. Ultimately Linois failed to defeat the convoy, withdrawing after some initial skirmishing at the Battle of Pulo Aura, but the importance of Batavia as a base against British shipping was confirmed.

The British commander in the Indian Ocean, Rear-admiral Peter Rainier, was preoccupied with protecting merchant shipping off India during 1804 and 1805 to be able to risk an expedition to the Java Sea. His successor, Rear-admiral Sir Edward Pellew was distracted by the continued operations of Linois's squadron and attacks from frigates based at Isle de France to take any action against the Dutch before the beginning of the monsoon season at the end of 1805, at which point the threat posed by hurricanes prevented any major seabourne operations. However, by early 1806, the departure of Linois into the Atlantic Ocean allowed Pellew and his squadron in Madras to consider offensive operations against enemy harbours. In addition to the threat from cruising French squadrons, a squadron of the navy of the Kingdom of Holland under Vice-admiral Pieter Hartsinck was based at Batavia. Hartsinck's squadron, which consisted of three ships of the line, three frigates and a number of smaller warships, was principally tasked with anti-piracy operations, but their presence so close to the Malacca Straits was a source of concern to the British command in India. Control of the Indian Ocean was essential for the British war effort, because the British economy relied heavily on trade with British India and other parts of Asia, particularly China.

== Campaign ==
=== Frigate reconnaissance ===
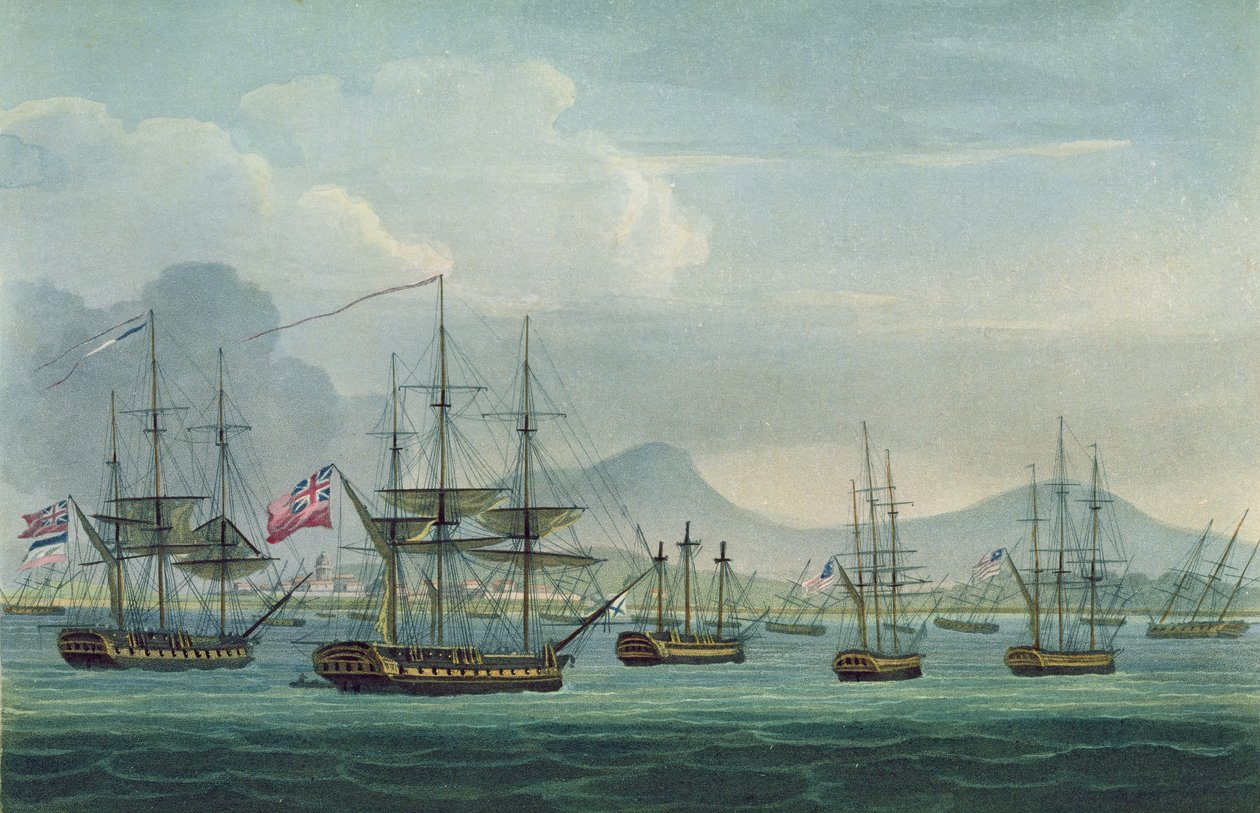
The action of 18 October 1806, the second engagement of the campaign

Pellew's efforts to launch a major deployment in 1806—initially planned to be against Isle de France in conjunction with Rear-Admiral Sir Thomas Troubridge before the target was changed to Java—were delayed by the diversion of his Royal Marines to put down the Vellore Mutiny. Nevertheless, Pellew despatched several frigates to the Java Sea to reconnoitre the region, attack Dutch shipping and report on the state of the Dutch squadron maintained at Batavia. The first ships despatched were the 32-gun frigate HMS Greyhound under Captain Edward Elphinstone and the 18-gun brig-sloop HMS Harrier under Commander Edward Troubridge, son of Admiral Troubridge.

Elphinstone initially cruised through the Molucca Islands in June and July with some success, and on 25 July he discovered four Dutch ships passing through the Selayar Strait. Cautious of the larger force, Elphinstone observed the Dutch ships during the night and on the morning of 26 July identified the ships as a frigate, a corvette and two merchant ships, including a large East Indiaman. In response to the British ships, Dutch Captain Nicolaas Sebastiaan Aalbers formed his convoy into a line of battle, hoping to dissuade Elphinstone from pressing home his attack. The British were not deterred and Greyhound engaged the Dutch frigate Pallas directly while Harrier passed between the frigate and the merchant ship next in line, raking them both. Within 40 minutes, Pallas had surrendered and Harrier then successfully chased down and captured the two merchant ships while the corvette fled to the Sulawesi coast, evading pursuit.

In the wake of Elphinstone's success, a second frigate entered Dutch waters, HMS Caroline under Captain Peter Rainier (nephew of Admiral Rainier) cruising the Java Sea during October. There Rainer discovered that the Dutch ships of the line had sailed eastward from Batavia, except Schrikverwekker, which had been wrecked in the Thousand Islands on 18 May with the loss of two men. He also learned that the Dutch frigate Phoenix was undergoing repairs at an exposed anchorage on Onrust Island close to Batavia harbour. Sailing to investigate, Caroline arrived off the port on 18 October, but encountered two Dutch brigs that raised the alarm, allowing Phoenix to escape into the main harbour. Undeterred, Rainier sailed into Batavia roadstead and there discovered a number of small warships and the frigate Maria Riggersbergen. The smaller ships drove themselves on shore rather than fight the larger British vessel, but Captain Claas Jager on Maria Riggersbergen engaged Caroline. In a battle lasting 30 minutes, the Dutch ship was defeated and captured, Rainier sending the prisoners on shore and removing the frigate, which was later renamed HMS Java.

=== Attack on Batavia ===
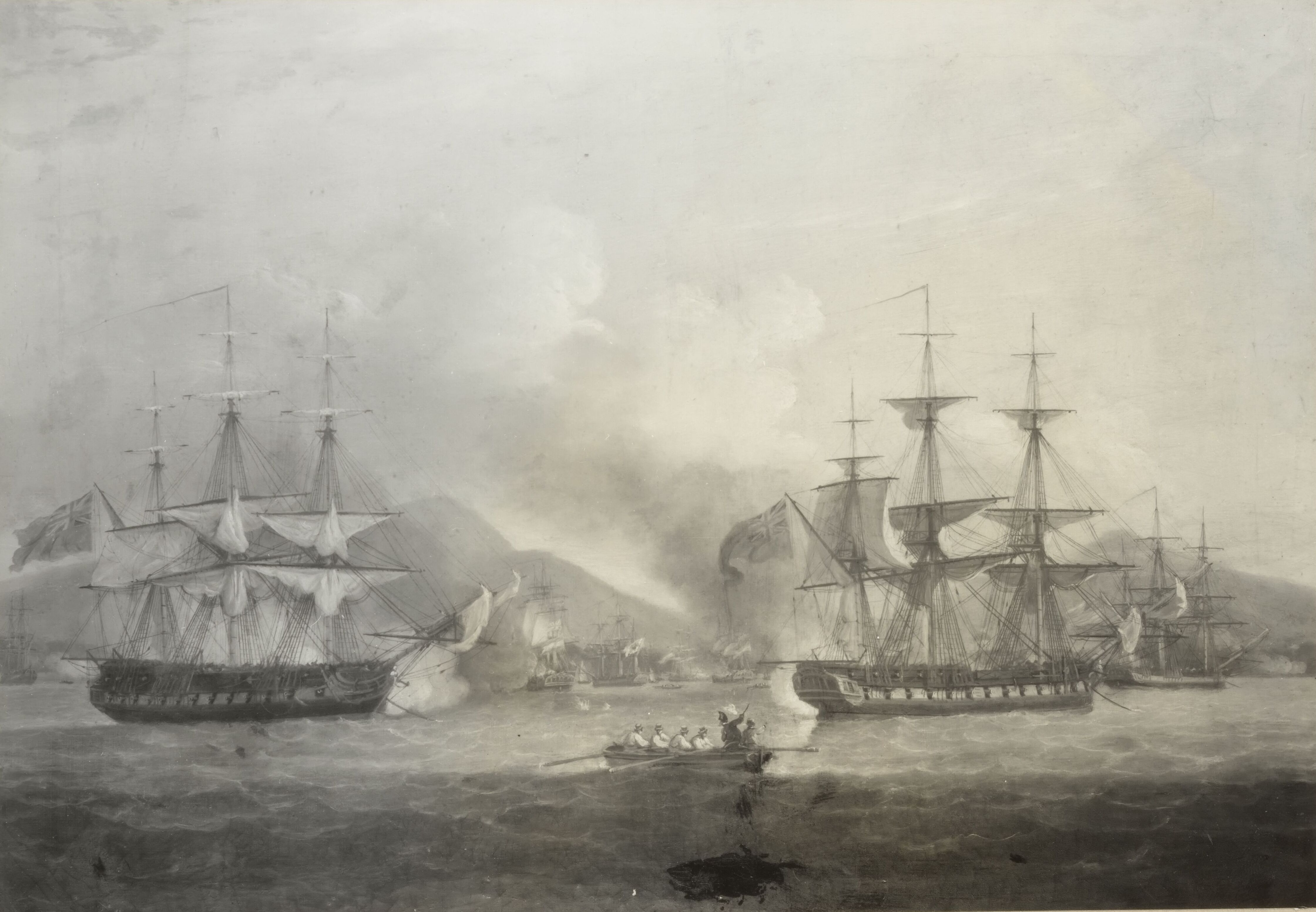
The British raid on Batavia on 27 November 1806

Encouraged by the success of his frigates in the Java Sea, Pellew mustered a significant force in the early autumn of 1806, including four ships of the line, two frigates and a brig with which to eliminate the remaining Dutch squadron. Reaching the Sunda Strait on 23 November, Pellew passed by the port of Bantam and on 27 November reached Batavia, splitting his forces so that the lighter vessels sailed close to shore and the ships of the line remained in deeper water outside the channel entering the harbour. A corvette was captured, and the rest of the Dutch squadron was taken by surprise, mistaking Pellew's force for a French squadron. By the time their mistake was revealed, the harbour was already blocked and so Captain F. W. C. van de Sande drove Phoenix ashore, followed by six other warships and 22 merchant ships.

Determined to eliminate the Dutch ships, Admiral Pellew gave orders that the squadron's boats gather next to the frigate HMS Terpsichore commanded by his son Captain Fleetwood Pellew. Boarding parties of sailors and Royal Marines were then despatched to the stranded Dutch vessels, under the distant cover of the frigates and coming under attack by Dutch batteries from the shoreline. Boarding Phoenix, it was discovered that van de Sande had ordered his ship to be scuttled, rendering Phoenix useless. Taking over the wrecked ship's guns, Captain Pellew opened fire on the other grounded ships, as his boats approached and boarded them in turn, the entire operation conducted with the loss of just one man killed and four wounded. Once taken, the ships that could not be refloated were burnt, Captain Pellew waiting until the rest of the Dutch ships were destroyed before setting fire to the wreck of Phoenix and returning to his ship. In total, one frigate, seven smaller warships and 20 merchant ships were destroyed, while one small warship and two merchant craft were captured. With his objective complete, Admiral Pellew ordered his ships to disperse and return to friendly ports for the winter.

=== Griessie ===
When the winter hurricane season ended in the spring of 1807, Admiral Pellew found his squadron dispersed on a variety of operations from the Red Sea to the South China Sea. Without the forces required for an extended operation against the remainder of the Dutch squadron, Pellew was forced to limit his operations in the Java Sea to frigate reconnaissance, sending HMS Caroline and Psyche (under Fleetwood Pellew) to ascertain the exact location of the Dutch ships of the line. On 29 August, the frigates reached Panka at the easternmost point of Java and the following day captured a merchant ship from Batavia which revealed that the Dutch ships of the line were anchored at Griessie near Surabaya and had deteriorated beyond repair. With their mission complete, the frigates separated to raid Dutch shipping, Psyche sailing west along the coast until Pellew reached the port of Semarang.

Observing two ships at anchor in Semarang roads, Pellew sent in his ship's boats on the morning of 31 August under the command of Lieutenant Kersteman. Despite heavy fire from batteries on shore, Kersteman successfully towed the vessels out without suffering any casualties, capturing an 8-gun schooner and a merchant brig. While the boats were engaged at Semarang, Pellew sighted three vessels cruising off the mouth of the harbour and hastily set fire to the prizes and reclaimed his boats, setting off in pursuit. At 15:30, with Psyche rapidly overtaking the Dutch ships, their captains deliberately drove the vessels ashore approximately 9 nmi (10 mi; 17 km) west of Semarang. Psyche closed with the grounded ships and exchanged fire with them at long range, the shallow coastal water preventing a close range engagement. At 16:30, just as Pellew was hoisting out his boats in preparation for a boarding action, one of the ships surrendered. Within minutes, the others followed, firing final broadsides and hauling down their colours. The surrendered ships were boarded and refloated, their identities established as the 24-gun corvette Scipio, the armed merchant ship Resolutie and the 12-gun Dutch East India Company ship Ceres. Dutch casualties are unknown but the commander of the convoy—Captain Carriage—was killed in the brief engagement, while Psyche survived the action without a man killed or wounded. All of the prisoners were landed at Semarang under terms of parole, as many of Pellew's men were away from the ship in prizes and men could not be spared to watch the Dutch prisoners.

In the summer of 1807, responsibility for the blockade of the French Indian Ocean bases passed from Pellew at Madras to Rear-Admiral Albemarle Bertie at the Cape Colony. This enabled Pellew to concentrate on the Dutch East Indies and temporarily relocate his base to Malacca on the Malay Peninsula. Following the reports of his scouting frigates, Pellew sailed from Malacca with a squadron of ships on 20 November, intending to destroy the remaining Dutch vessels on Java. Arriving at the Madura Strait on 5 December, Pellew sent a small boat party to Griessie with a demand that the Dutch authorities surrender the ships. However, Captain William Cowell, an American officer in the Dutch navy, refused the demand and arrested the boat party, notifying Pellew of his actions and preparing his defences. The following day, Pellew sailed his squadron into the Straits, exchanging fire with a Dutch shore battery at Sambelangan on Madura Island.

As Pellew's squadron neared Griessie, a message arrived from the Dutch governor at Sourabaya, reversing Cowell's orders and offering a full surrender. Pellew accepted the message and on 7 December his ships entered Griessie. However, during the time it had taken to exchange messages, Cowell had ordered the scuttling of all ships in Griessie harbour to prevent them from falling into British hands. The ships were scuttled in shallow water, leaving only wrecked hulls for the British to claim. Pellew ordered the hulls burned, and British landing parties entered the town, burning and destroying all military supplies and cannon they found. Another British party landed at Sambelangan and demolished the battery there. Pellew withdrew on 11 December, his ambition of destroying the Dutch East Indies squadron complete.

== Aftermath ==
The success of the campaign against the Dutch squadron in the East Indies allowed British forces in the Indian Ocean to focus exclusively on Isle de France and Isle Bonaparte, which proved difficult to subdue during the ensuing Mauritius campaign of 1809–1811. Freedom of movement for British forces in the East Indies proved invaluable however: on 27 January 1807, Peter Rainier in Caroline had seized a Spanish ship San Raphael carrying over half a million Spanish dollars and an exceptionally valuable cargo, and the ability of British commerce raiders to act against French, Spanish and Dutch merchant shipping in the region was assured. When Pellew's successor Rear-Admiral William O'Bryen Drury attempted to eliminate the Dutch East Indies islands in a series of large scale invasions during 1810, the Spice Islands were captured and in 1811 Java was seized. British naval movements were completely unopposed, allowing a rapid and successful conclusion to the war in the Pacific.

== Bibliography ==
- Adkins, Roy & Lesley (2006). The War for All the Oceans. Abacus. ISBN 0-349-11916-3.
- Clowes, William Laird (1997) [1900]. The Royal Navy, A History from the Earliest Times to 1900, Volume V. Chatham Publishing. ISBN 1-86176-014-0.
- Grocott, Terence (2002) [1997]. Shipwrecks of the Revolutionary & Napoleonic Era. Caxton Editions. ISBN 1-84067-164-5.
- Henderson CBE, James (1994) [1970]. The Frigates. Leo Cooper. ISBN 0-85052-432-6.
- James, William (2002) [1827]. The Naval History of Great Britain, Volume 3, 1800–1805. Conway Maritime Press. ISBN 0-85177-907-7.
- James, William (2002) [1827]. The Naval History of Great Britain, Volume 4, 1805–1807. Conway Maritime Press. ISBN 0-85177-908-5.
- Woodman, Richard (2001). The Sea Warriors. Constable Publishers. ISBN 1-84119-183-3.
- Woodman, Richard (1998). The victory of seapower. Chatham Publishing.
