= Raid on Griessie =

1807 raid of the Java campaign of 1806–1807

- Part of the Java campaign of 1806–1807
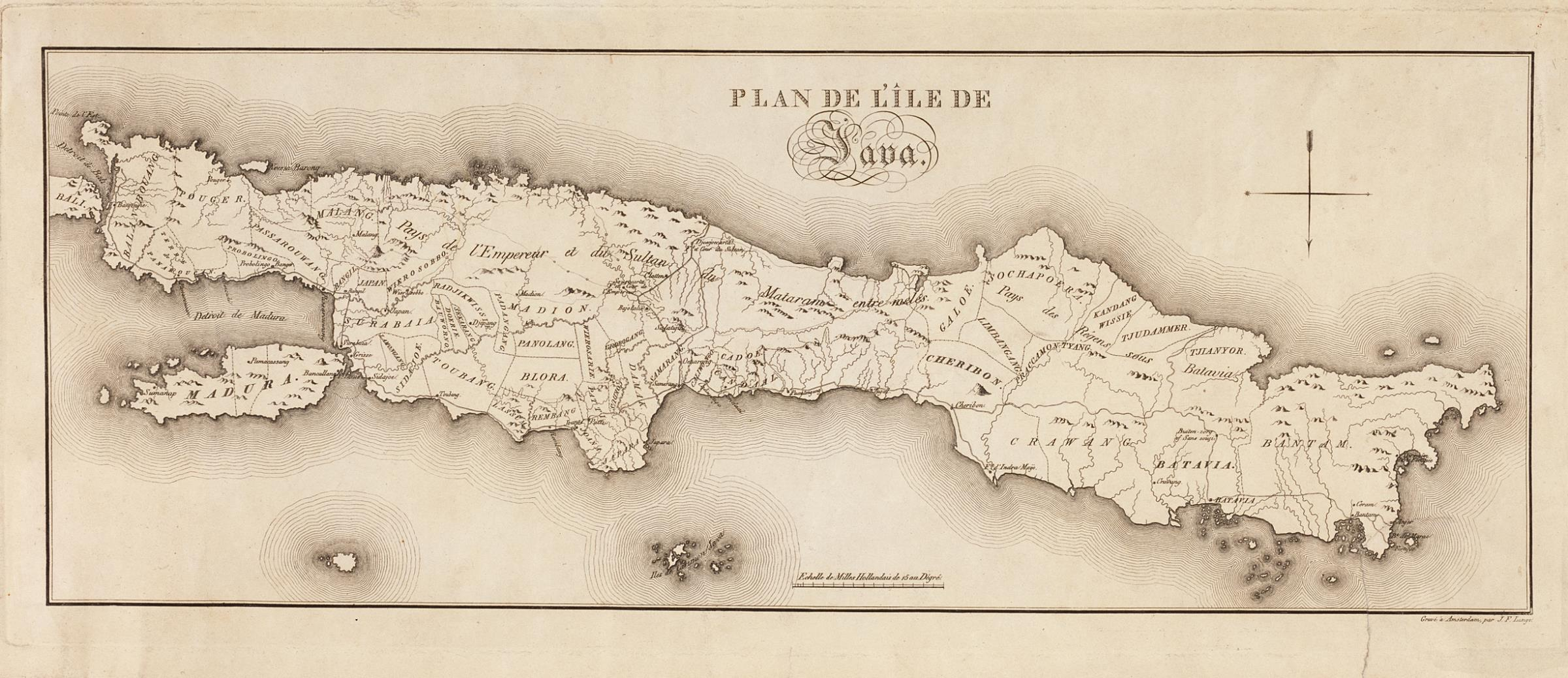
- 1800 map of Java
Date	5–11 December 1807
Location	Griessie, Dutch East Indies 7°08′17″S 112°39′10″E
Result	British victory

Belligerents
United Kingdom	Kingdom of Holland; Dutch East Indies

Commanders and leaders
Edward Pellew	William Cowell

Strength
2 ships of the line 2 frigates 4 sloops-of-war	3 ships of the line 1 merchant ship 1 gun battery

Casualties and losses
1 killed 4 wounded	3 ships of the line scuttled 1 merchant ship scuttled 1 gun battery destroyed

The raid on Griessie was a British attack on the port of Griessie in the Dutch East Indies in December 1807 during the Java campaign of 1806–1807. It was the final action in a series of engagements fought by the British squadron based in the Indian Ocean against the Dutch navy's forces in Java. It completed the destruction of the Dutch squadron with the scuttling of three ships of the line, the last Dutch warships in the region. The British squadron—under the command of Rear-Admiral Sir Edward Pellew—sought to eliminate the Dutch to safeguard the trade route with China, which ran through the Straits of Malacca and were in the range of Dutch raiders operating from the principal Javan port of Batavia.

In mid-1806, British frigates reconnoitred Javan waters and captured two Dutch frigates, encouraging Pellew to lead a major attack on Batavia that destroyed the last Dutch frigate and several smaller warships. Before the Batavia raid, Dutch Vice-Admiral Pieter Hartsinck had ordered his ships of the line to sail eastwards, where they took shelter at Griessie, near Surabaya. On the morning of 5 December 1807, a second raiding squadron under Pellew appeared off Griessie and demanded that the Dutch squadron in the harbour surrender. The squadron's commander, Captain William Cowell, refused and seized the boat party carrying the message. Pellew responded by advancing up the river and exchanging fire with a Dutch gun battery on Madura Island. At that point, the governor in Surabaya overruled Cowell, released the seized boat party, and agreed to surrender the ships at anchor in Gresik harbour.

By the time Pellew reached the anchorage, Cowell had scuttled all the ships in shallow water, and Pellew could only set the wreckage on fire. Landing shore parties, the British destroyed all military supplies in the town and demolished the battery on Madura. With the destruction of the force in Griessie, the last of the Dutch naval forces in the Pacific were eliminated. British forces returned to the region in 1810 with a large-scale expeditionary force that successfully invaded and captured Java in 1811, temporarily removing the last Dutch colony east of Africa.

== Background ==
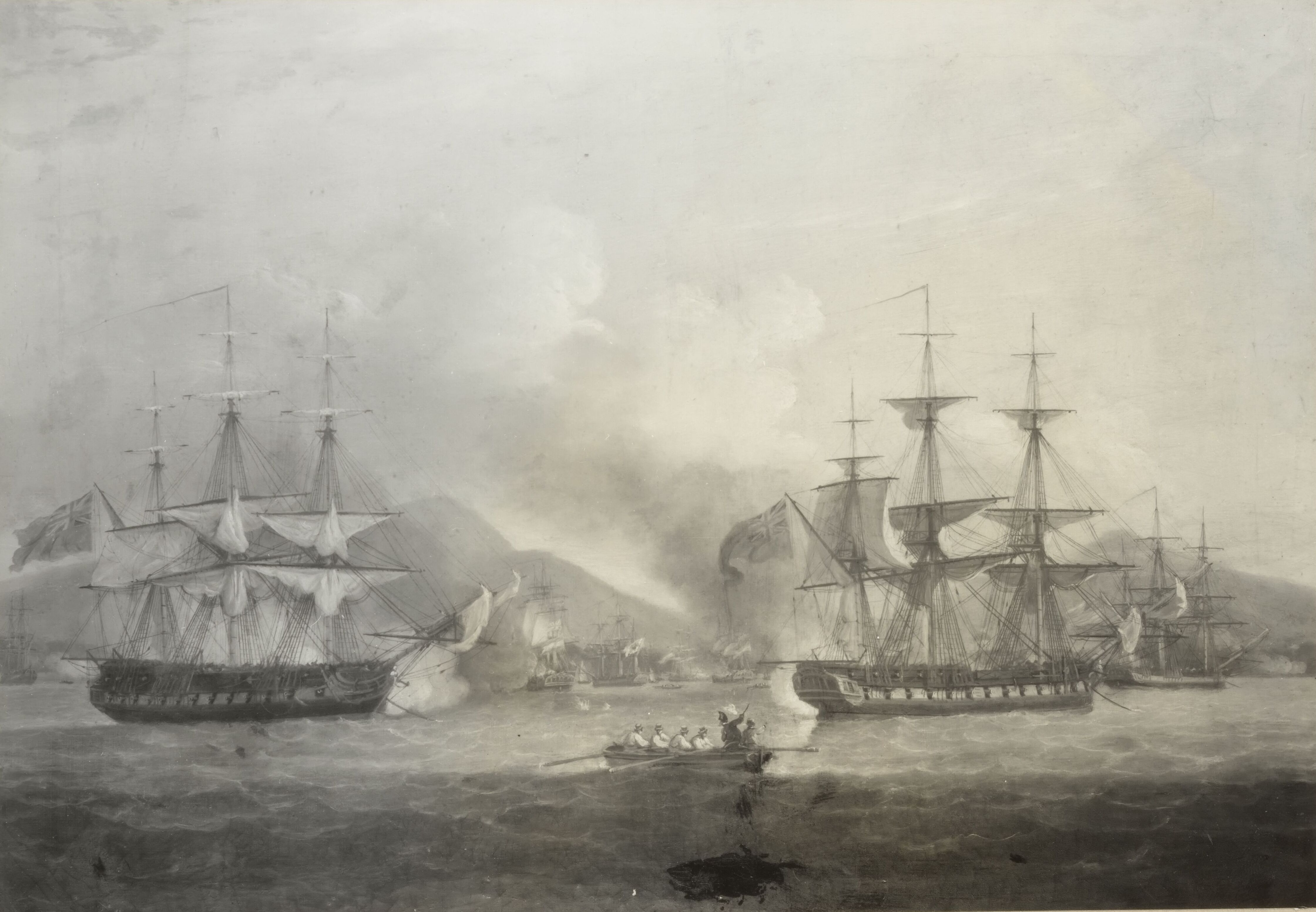
The British raid on Batavia, which preceded the raid on Griessie

In 1804, at the start of the Napoleonic Wars, a powerful French squadron operating from Batavia harbour on the Dutch island colony of Java attacked a large and valuable British merchant convoy sailing from China near the Straits of Malacca in the Battle of Pulo Aura. The French attack was a failure. Still, the threat posed to British trade passing through the Strait of Malacca by French or Dutch warships had been demonstrated. Determined to eliminate this threat, the commander of Royal Navy forces in the Indian Ocean—Rear-Admiral Sir Edward Pellew—ordered frigates to reconnoitre Dutch naval activity in the East Indies in mid-1806. The Dutch navy maintained a small squadron in the region under Vice-Admiral Pieter Hartsinck, principally intended to operate against pirates, consisting of three 68-gun ships of the line, three frigates, and several smaller vessels. Despite the obsolete nature of many of these ships, they nevertheless threatened British trade, and Pellew's frigates raided Dutch harbours and merchant shipping extensively during their patrols.

At the action of 26 July 1806, a Dutch convoy sailing along the southern coast of Celebes was attacked and defeated by one of Pellew's reconnaissance frigates, HMS Greyhound. Among the captured ships were the Dutch frigate Pallas and two large merchant vessels. Three months later, the frigate HMS Caroline entered Batavia harbour itself, seizing the Dutch frigate Maria Riggersbergen at the action of 18 October 1806. These successes encouraged Pellew to conduct a larger scale operation, launching a major Raid on Batavia harbour on 27 November 1806. As his large squadron sailed into the bay, the surviving Dutch ships were driven on shore to avoid capture, boarding parties under Pellew's son, Captain Fleetwood Pellew, completing the destruction by setting the wrecks on fire.

Much of the Dutch East Indies squadron, including the three aging 68-gun ships of the line Kortenaer, Pluto and Revolutie, escaped the raid. Hartsinck sought to divide his forces shortly before Pellew's attack and consequently sent several vessels eastwards along the Javan coast under Captain William Cowell, an American captain in the Dutch navy. Cowell's force eventually sheltered in a protected anchorage at the town of Griessie near Surabaya, 570 mi (500 nmi; 920 km) to the east of Batavia. There, the squadron rapidly deteriorated to the point where Kortenaer was converted into a sheer hulk and Pluto and Revolutie were disarmed, their cannon transferred onto nearby shore batteries.

Pellew could not return to Java early in 1807, as his ships were dispersed on separate operations across the Indian Ocean, some deploying as far west as the Red Sea. However, during the summer responsibility for the blockade of the French island bases of Île Bonaparte and Isle de France (now Mauritius) passed from Pellew to Rear-Admiral Albemarle Bertie at the Cape of Good Hope and Pellew was once again free to concentrate against the remainder of the Dutch squadron. During the absence of his main force, Pellew had sent two frigates into Javan waters: Caroline under Captain Peter Rainier and HMS Psyche under his son Captain Fleetwood Pellew. These ships rapidly established the location and the state of the Dutch ships of the line. Then they separated to raid Dutch merchant shipping, Psyche having considerable success at Semarang on 31 August when Captain Pellew destroyed two Dutch vessels and captured three, including the Dutch 24-gun corvette Scipio, which the British renamed Samarang.

== Raid ==
When news of the Dutch whereabouts reached Pellew at Malacca, he immediately assembled a force from nearby warships, including his flagship HMS Culloden under Commander George Bell, ship of the line HMS Powerful under Fleetwood Pellew, (Note: The former commander of Powerful, Captain Robert Plampin, had returned to Britain in 1807 due to ill health. Pellew's father subsequently ensured his son's elevation to command the ship of the line. Captain Pellew's command was temporary and the following year, once his father had moved to command the Mediterranean Fleet, he was transferred to the frigate HMS Phaeton.) the frigates Caroline under Commander Henry Hart and HMS Fox under Captain Archibald Cochrane, and the sloop-of-wars HMS Victor under Lieutenant Thomas Groube, HMS Samarang under Lieutenant Richard Buck, HMS Seaflower under Lieutenant William Fitzwilliam Owen and HMS Jaseur under Lieutenant Thomas Langharne. The East Indiaman Worcester, which carried 500 men from the 30th Regiment of Foot under Lieutenant-Colonel Lockhart for any landing operations that might be required, accompanied the squadron

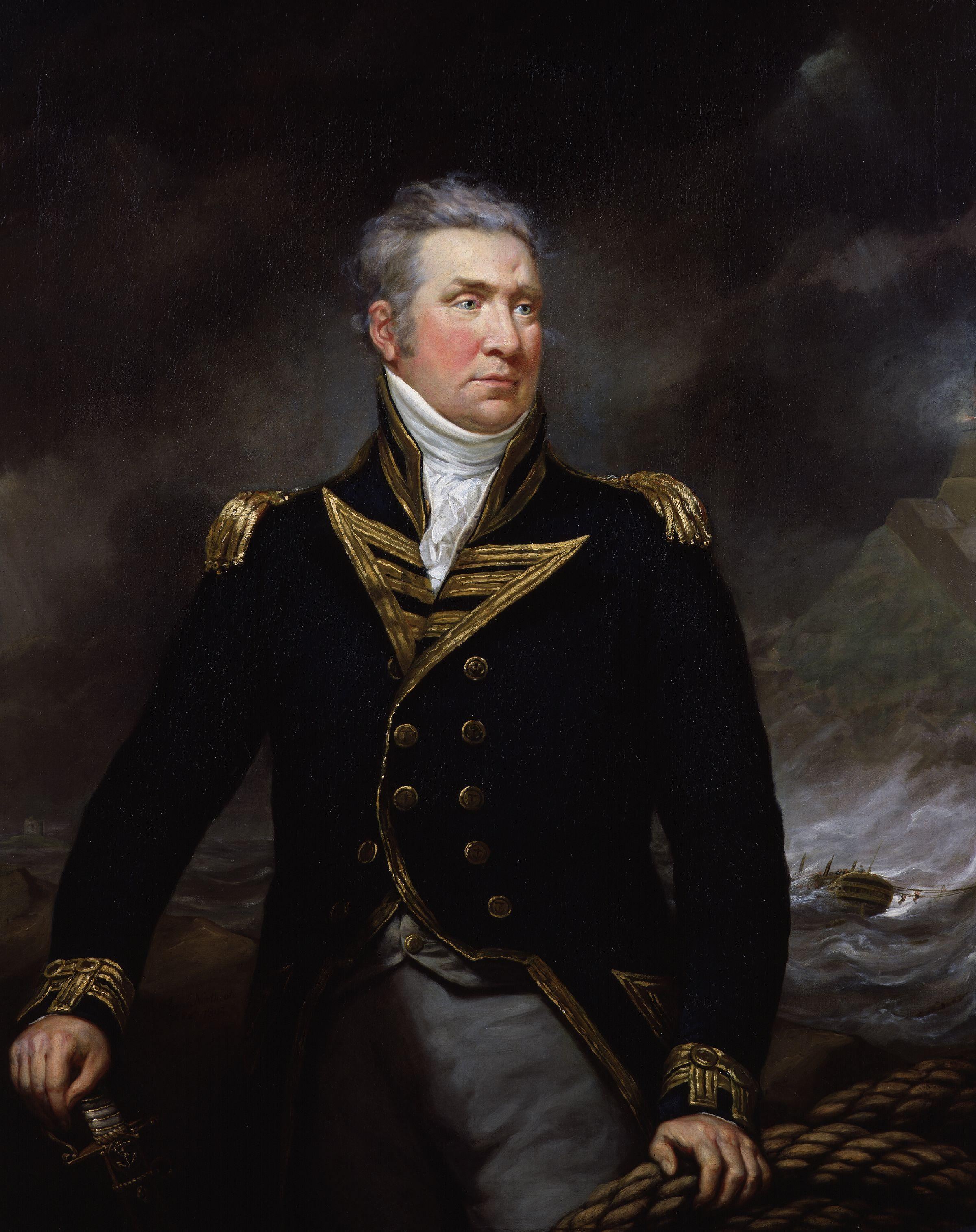
1804 portrait of Sir Edward Pellew

Sailing from Malacca on 20 November, Pellew's squadron passed along the Javan coast for 15 days, reaching Panka Point on 5 December and sending a boat under a flag of truce into Griessie with instructions for the Dutch commander to surrender his ships. Cowell refused and ordered the boat party to be arrested. He then sent a Dutch officer aboard Culloden to inform Pellew of his actions. In response, Pellew determined to attack the port and ordered that Culloden and Powerful be lightened by removing unnecessary stores to enable them to sail into the shallow straits.

On 6 December, the British squadron moved steadily towards Griessie through the Madura Strait, coming under fire from heated cannonballs from a battery of nine cannon situated at Sambelangan on Madura Island. Returning fire with his full squadron, Pellew rapidly silenced the battery without loss or significant damage to his ships, and as the squadron approached Griessie, a message from the civilian governor in Surabaya reached Pellew, reversing Cowell's orders, releasing the captured boat party and unconditionally surrendering the ships in the harbour.

On 7 December, Pellew agreed to formal terms for the surrender of Revolutie, Pluto, Kortenaer and the Dutch East Indiaman Rustloff that were anchored in Griessie. However, when British boats entered the harbour, it was discovered that Cowell had issued orders for all four ships to be scuttled, their wrecks protruding from the shallow water. Unable to remove the ships, Pellew ordered their remains burnt while British landing parties spread throughout the town, burning the military stores and destroying the cannon that had been removed from the ship. Another landing party took possession of the remains of the battery at Sambelangan and demolished it. British operations were complete by 11 December, and Pellew ordered the squadron to withdraw and return to India.

== Aftermath ==
The final operation of Pellew's Java campaign, completed with minimal casualties on either side, saw the eradication of the Dutch naval presence in the East Indies for the remainder of the war. With the Dutch removed, British attention turned to the French Indian Ocean islands, which they blockaded and captured during the Mauritius campaign of 1809–1811. Once Mauritius had been captured, British forces returned to the East Indies, expeditionary forces overwhelming the Dutch defenders on several islands, Java falling last. By that time, Pellew was serving in the Mediterranean, and British control of the Indian Ocean was assured, the British remaining in possession of the East Indies until they were returned to the Netherlands following the capture of Napoleon and the Anglo-Dutch Treaty of 1814 signed at the Convention of London. The East Indies were handed over in 1816 after Napoleon's final defeat at the Battle of Waterloo in 1815.

== Bibliography ==
- Clowes, William Laird (1997) [1900]. The Royal Navy, A History from the Earliest Times to 1900, Volume V. Chatham Publishing. ISBN 1-86176-014-0.
- Gardiner, Robert, ed. (2001) [1998]. The Victory of Seapower. Caxton Editions. ISBN 1-84067-359-1.
- Henderson CBE, James (1994) [1970]. The Frigates. Leo Cooper. ISBN 0-85052-432-6.
- James, William (2002) [1827]. The Naval History of Great Britain, Volume 4, 1805–1807. Conway Maritime Press. ISBN 0-85177-908-5.
