= Peter Rainier (Royal Navy officer, born 1784) =

Royal Navy officer (1784–1836)

Captain Peter Rainier CB
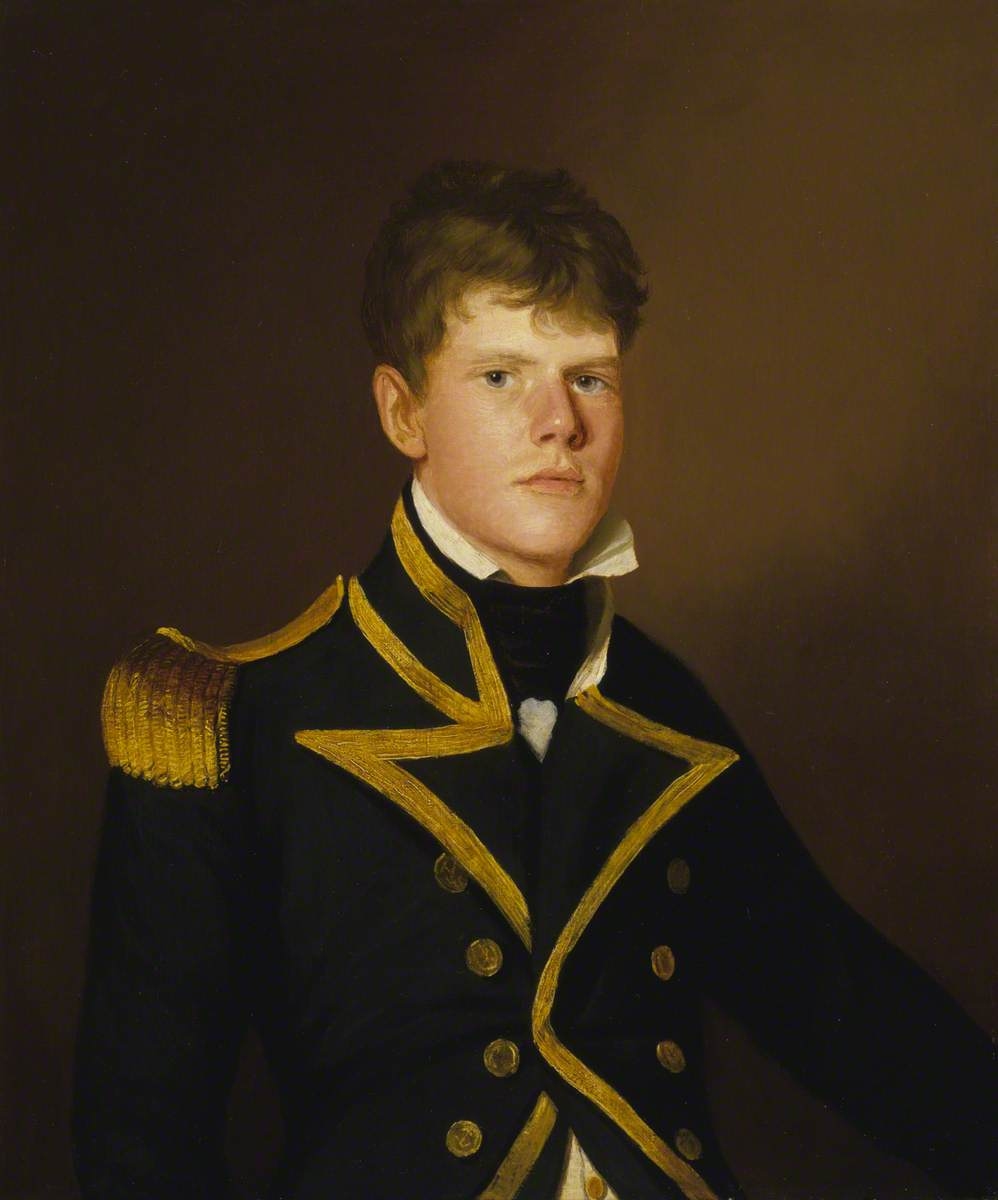
- 1806 portrait of Rainier by Thomas Hickey
- Born: 24 August 1784
- Died: 13 April 1836 (aged 51); Southampton, Hampshire
- Military career
- Allegiance: Great Britain; United Kingdom
- Branch: Royal Navy
- Service years: 1795–1836
- Rank: Captain
- Commands: HMS Dasher; HMS Dedaigneuse; HMS Caroline; HMS Niger; HMS Britannia
- Conflicts: French Revolutionary War; Napoleonic Wars; Action of 18 October 1806

Captain Peter Rainier CB (24 August 1784 – 13 April 1836) was a Royal Navy officer who served in the French Revolutionary and Napoleonic Wars. Due to the patronage of his uncle, Vice-admiral Peter Rainier, he was promoted quickly through the ranks so that by the age of twenty Rainier was already a post-captain. He was given command of the 36-gun frigate HMS Caroline and in the action of 18 October 1806 captured the 36-gun Dutch frigate Maria Reijersbergen off Batavia.

Rainier captured the Spanish treasure ship San Rafael in January 1807 off the Philippines, which had on board £500,000 worth of bullion coin. He left Caroline later in the year and received his next command, the 38-gun frigate HMS Niger, in June 1813. Commanding Niger, Rainier participated in the capture of the 44-gun French frigate Ceres off the Cape Verde Islands in January 1814. He left Niger at the end of the Napoleonic Wars and did not receive another command until 1831 when Rainier was given command of the 120-gun ship of the line HMS Britannia, in which he served in the Mediterranean Fleet until 1835. Rainier died on April 1836 in Southampton after a short illness.

== Early life ==
Peter Rainier was born on 24 August 1784 to John and Susannah Rainier. The Rainier family was of Huguenot descent, with his great-grandfather having left France for Ramsgate when the Edict of Nantes was revoked in 1685. The family was well known in the British naval community, with many family members serving in the Royal Navy.

== Naval career ==
Rainier joined the Royal Navy in August 1795 in the ship of the line HMS Pompee, commanded by his uncle Captain James Vashon. In the proceeding years he served in frigates commanded by Captain Arthur Kaye Legge and Captain Charles Adam before being promoted to lieutenant in early 1802. He was given command of the 18-gun sloop HMS Dasher in December 1804, after the death of her previous captain, on the East Indies Station. The commander in chief there was another uncle, his godfather Vice-Admiral Peter Rainier. The admiral was infamous for shamelessly advancing and promoting his family, as he had already done for Rainier's cousin John Spratt Rainier, a future rear-admiral. Almost immediately Rainier was promoted to commander by his uncle and in February 1805 he was made an acting post-captain.

The newly promoted Rainier was given command of the 40-gun frigate HMS Dedaigneuse at the same time, and commanded her until April when he transferred into the 36-gun frigate HMS Caroline. Rainier's rise through the ranks was infamously fast, being only twenty years old at the time, and a number of records failed to note his promotions to lieutenant or commander at all because of the brevity in which he held these ranks.

=== Action of 18 October 1806 ===
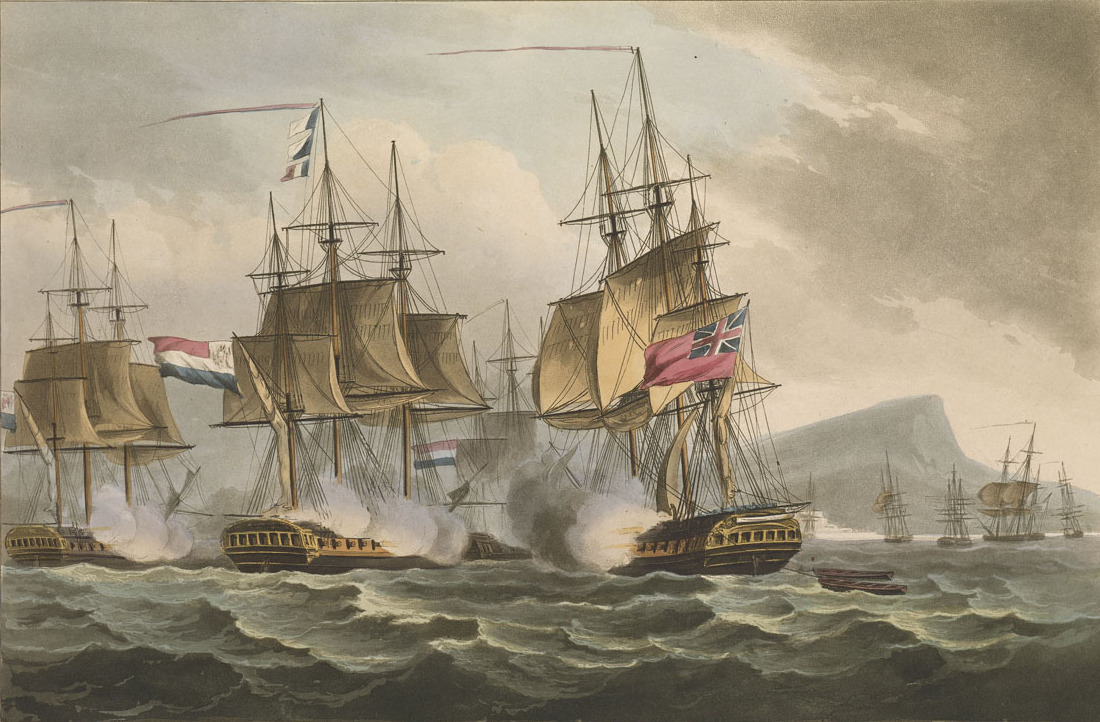
The action of 18 October 1806 with HMS Caroline on the right

Rainier's rank as a post-captain was confirmed on 17 January 1806. He continued to serve on the East Indies Station and was very successful in Caroline during the Java campaign of 1806–1807, fighting the action of 18 October 1806; Rainier had been patrolling off Batavia when he captured a small Dutch brig, the crew of which informed him that the Dutch 36-gun frigate Phoenix was making repairs at Onroost Island nearby and was vulnerable to attack. He sailed Caroline to the area and while doing so discovered two more Dutch brigs, these ones warships, of which he managed to capture one, the 14-gun Zeerop, while the other hugged the coastline to escape where Caroline could not follow. While Rainier was securing the newly captured vessel Phoenix used the opportunity to sail from Onroost into Batavia Roads. From the crew of Zeerop Rainier learned that another Dutch frigate, the 36-gun Maria Reijersbergen, was also at Batavia along with some smaller warships, the 20-gun William, 18-gun Patriot, and 14-gun Zeephlong.

Phoenix having made her escape, Rainier chose to instead attack Maria Reijersbergen as the largest threat, despite his crew already being down by fifty-seven due to the needs of prize crews and sickness, and having been warned by his Dutch captives that she was already prepared for battle. Rainier sailed Caroline into the Roads and straight for the Dutch frigate, attacking her from extremely close range. The two ships fought each other in this position for half an hour before Maria Reijersbergen surrendered. The battle between the two frigates finished in very shallow water surrounded by dangerous shoals and so Rainier was not safely able to attack the other Dutch warships. Despite this inability to continue attacking, the remaining vessels, including the frigate Phoenix, ran themselves aground to avoid the fate of Maria Reijersbergen. Rainier brought the Dutch frigate away from Batavia before anchoring, having suffered twenty-two casualties compared to Maria Reijersbergen's fifty. (Note: Rainier would go on to integrate the capture of Maria Reijersbergen into his coat of arms.) She was bought into the Royal Navy and named HMS Java. Despite the action being highly acclaimed, Rainier was not rewarded by the navy for it; it has been suggested that this was because of a combination of his young age (twenty-two at the time) and as a form of censure for how he had been so quickly promoted through his uncle's nepotism.

=== Treasure ship and end of Java campaign ===
Rainier continued his successes in Caroline into 1807; on 27 January he was sailing off the Philippines when an unknown ship was spotted, and upon Caroline approaching her she hoisted Spanish colours. The ship was much smaller than Caroline, but when Rainier brought his ship alongside her the Spanish ship opened fire; Caroline responded in kind and forced the ship to strike her colours after killing or injuring 27 members of her crew. Upon taking possession of the Spanish ship, the British discovered that she was the 16-gun San Rafael of the Royal Company of the Philippines, sailing from Lima to Manila under the name Pallas. San Rafael was operating as a treasure ship for the company and was carrying £500,000 worth of bullion coin and 1,700 quintals of copper, all of which was captured by the British. (Note: The prize money for San Rafael totalled around £170,000 of which Rainier received £50,000.)

Peter died in 1808 and left his fortune to Rainier and his cousin John. He had left the East Indies in 1805 and one of his replacements as commander-in-chief was Rear-Admiral Sir Edward Pellew, who in November 1806 had finished off the job Rainier had started at Batavia in October by destroying Phoenix, William, Patriot, Zeephlong, and their smaller consorts. However prior to this the two largest remaining Dutch warships, the 68-gun ships of the line Revolutie and Pluto, had escaped. Pellew sent Rainier in Caroline alongside the 36-gun frigate HMS Psyche to hunt for these two ships in June, and on 30 August Caroline and Psyche successfully located the Dutch ships of the line in the fortified port of Griesse. Using this information Pellew would go on to destroy them in the raid on Griesse in December, but by this point Rainier had left Caroline, going home to England suffering from a probable fever.

=== Later service ===
After recuperating from his illness Rainier began to repeatedly petition the Admiralty for another command, but was unsuccessful until June 1813 when he was given command of the brand new 38-gun frigate HMS Niger. In Niger Rainier's first duty was to escort a valuable convoy of bullion coin to Spain, and he was then sent to the Texel with the 36-gun frigate HMS Fortunee under his orders to search for two French frigates. Poor weather meant Rainier was unable to find the French, but in November he captured the American 16-gun letter of marque Dart as she attempted to cross the Atlantic from New Orleans to France. In December he was sent as escort to another convoy alongside the 36-gun frigate HMS Tagus and on 5 January 1814 he was sailing with them off the Cape Verde Islands. The two frigates spotted a strange sail on the horizon and chased it, soon finding it to be the French 44-gun frigate Ceres. By the morning of 6 January, after sailing 238 miles, Tagus had drawn close enough to begin firing at the frigate; one of her shots destroyed Ceres's mainmast just as Rainier was bringing Niger into position to also fire into the French ship. Being outnumbered and unable to manoeuvre, Ceres then surrendered off Santo António. He cruised off the coast of Brazil in Niger for a while after this before sailing home to decommission her.

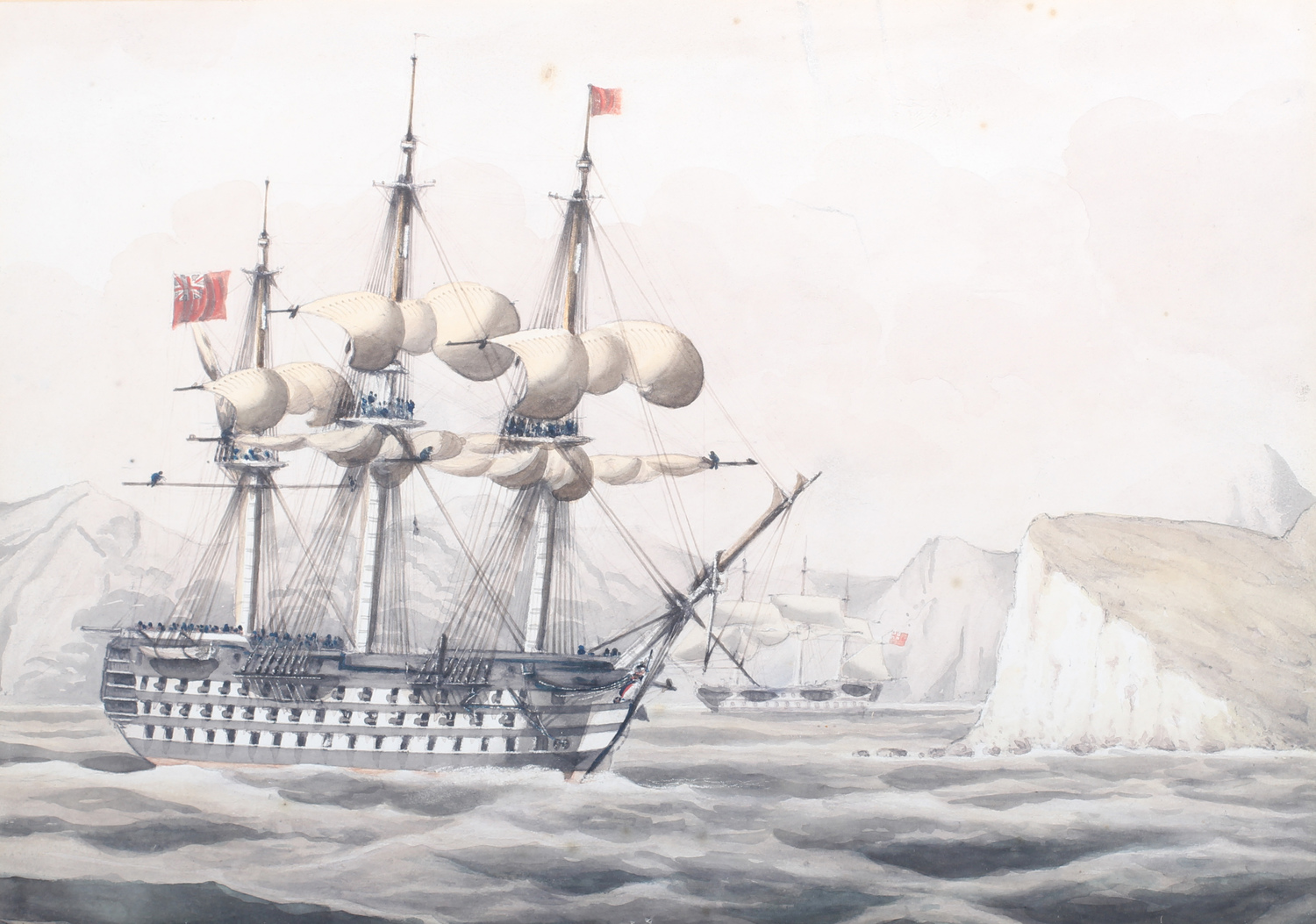
HMS Britannia during Rainier's command

For his services he was appointed a Companion of the Order of the Bath on 16 September 1815. With the Napoleonic Wars at an end the rate of promotion for officers slowed down considerably and having to rely on seniority alone, Rainier never reached the top of the captains' list to be promoted to flag rank. He was however still rewarded for his services, becoming a naval aide-de-camp to King William IV on 4 August 1830. He did not serve at sea again until October 1831 when he took command of the 120-gun ship of the line HMS Britannia. He served in Britannia in the Mediterranean Fleet of at first Vice-Admiral Sir Pulteney Malcolm and then Vice-Admiral Sir Josias Rowley, based at Malta. For at least some time he served as flag captain to Malcolm. He left the fleet and Britannia in February 1835.

== Other work and retirement ==
Since at least 1818 Rainier had lived in Hamilton Place, Southampton. He was a member of the Southampton Corporation and became a burgess in September 1826. In October of the following year he became a bailiff and then on 6 October 1829 he was made sheriff of Southampton. He also served as a magistrate for the county from 1825. He worked with his brother-in-law, Lieutenant-Colonel Henry Bowler, to record objects he discovered for the Royal Asiatic Society, and in 1833 they presented their findings on an engraved stone and avenue of sphinxes found by Rainier at the Temple of Kalabsha and Beni Hasan respectively in 1828 and 1829, when he travelled there while between commands. Rainier died at his home in Southampton on 13 April 1836 after a short illness, at the age of fifty-one.

== Family ==
Rainier married Elizabeth Crow of Middlesex (died 31 October 1852). Together they had four children:

- Caroline Rainier, who married Captain Ebenezer Jones on 6 July 1841.
- Ellen Catherine Rainier, who married William Yolland on 18 July 1843.
- Commander Peter Rainier, Royal Navy officer
- Lieutenant Charles Rainier, Royal Navy officer
