= Henry Hart (Royal Navy officer) =

British naval officer and diplomat

Rear-Admiral Sir Henry Hart KCH
- Born: 1 May 1781; Wilmington, Kent
- Died: 22 December 1856 (age 76); Queen's House, Greenwich
- Military career
- Allegiance: United Kingdom
- Branch: Royal Navy
- Service years: 1796–1846
- Rank: Rear-Admiral
- Commands: HMS Terpsichore; HMS Duncan; HMS Caroline; HMS Fox; HMS Thracian; HMS Cyrus; HMS Revenge; HMS Sapphire; HMS Melville; HMS Imogene
- Conflicts: French Revolutionary Wars; Action of 13 January 1797; Ferrol Expedition; Napoleonic Wars; Action of 5 October 1804; Raid on Griessie
- Awards: Knight Commander of the Royal Guelphic Order; Knight Bachelor; Naval General Service Medal with Droits de L'Homme and Cerbere clasps
- Other work: Commissioner of Greenwich Hospital, London

Rear-Admiral Sir Henry Hart KCH (1 May 1781 – 22 December 1856) was a British naval officer and diplomat of the eighteenth and nineteenth centuries. After a brief stint in the East India Company he joined the Royal Navy in 1796 on Sir Edward Pellew's frigate HMS Indefatigable, participating in the action of 13 January 1797 before following Pellew to the ship of the line HMS Impetueux where he experienced a mutiny before taking part in a number of cutting out expeditions and the Ferrol Expedition. At the Peace of Amiens Hart transferred to the ship of the line HMS Foudroyant in the Mediterranean Sea where he was promoted to lieutenant and joined Sir John Gore's frigate HMS Medusa, in which he participated in the action of 5 October 1804 before sailing to India in 1805. There he was reunited with Pellew who made him his flag lieutenant and appointed him to a succession of acting commands, including to that of the frigate HMS Caroline in which he played an important role in the Raid on Griessie in 1807.

In 1811 health issues forced Hart to return to England where he served in the English Channel before being promoted to post-captain later in the year. In 1814 he became the flag captain of Gore's flagship HMS Revenge in which he helped oversee France's surrender of Corfu. Hart's next command was the frigate HMS Sapphire which he sailed to the Leeward Islands to protect British interests in the warfare resulting from the Spanish American wars of independence. In 1820 he was again forced to relinquish his command due to ill health and he would not gain his next command for ten years until Gore again requested for him to become his flag captain on the East Indies and China Station. There he was given temporary command of the frigate HMS Imogene to go on a diplomatic mission to Zanzibar where he secured the loyalty of the imaum and received a ship of the line as a gift for William IV. In 1835 he returned to England and was knighted for his diplomatic and military services. He became a commissioner of Greenwich Hospital, London before being promoted as a retired rear-admiral in 1846. He died at Queen's House, Greenwich, on 22 December 1856 at the age of seventy-six.

== Early life ==
Henry Hart was born on 1 May 1781 at Wilmington in Kent as the eighth son of Richard Hart of Uckfield and his wife Sarah. On his mother's side he was related by marriage to Sir Thomas Miller and on his father's side to Sir Percival Hart Dyke, the Hart family being descended from Sir Percival Hart of Lullingstone Castle. As a child Hart joined the East India Company as a volunteer.

== Naval career ==
=== Early career ===
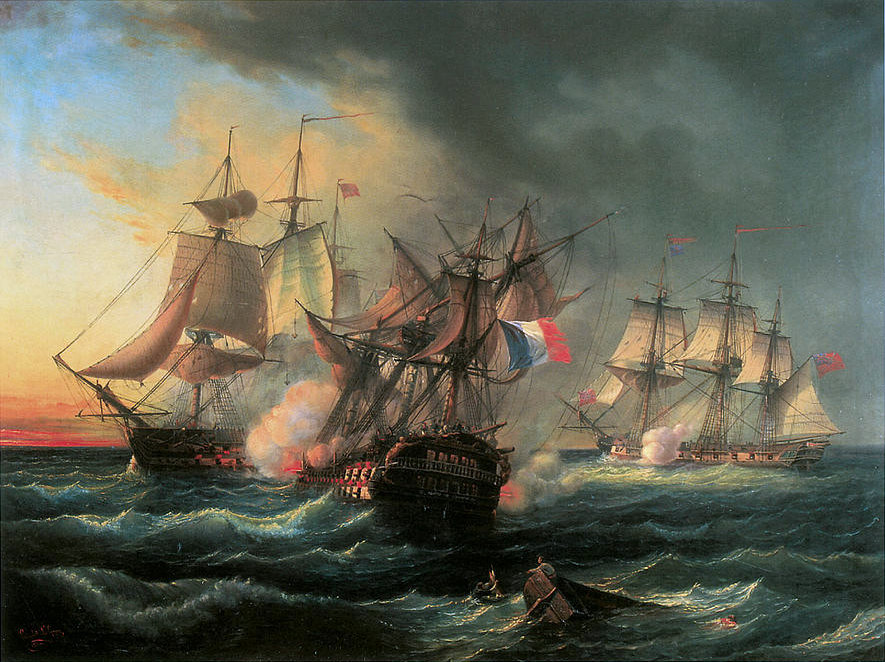
The action of 13 January 1797 in which Hart took part on board HMS Indefatigable

Hart left the East India Company for the Royal Navy in March 1796, becoming a midshipman on the frigate HMS Indefatigable under Captain Sir Edward Pellew in the English Channel. (Note: While Hart is recorded on the books of Indefatigable from March he only physically joined the ship in May, thus missing Indefatigable's capture of the French frigate Virginie on 29 April.) As such he participated in the action of 13 January 1797 where Indefatigable and the frigate HMS Amazon drove the French ship of the line Droits de l'Homme ashore, destroying her, in which action nineteen men of Indefatigable were injured.

Having become a follower of Pellew, Hart joined him in his new command, the ship of the line HMS Impetueux, in March 1799. (Note: While having no prior connection to Pellew, Hart became a lifelong friend of his and enjoyed a similarly close relationship with his wife Susan and son Fleetwood, also a naval officer.) He was rated as an able seaman upon joining Impetueux but was restored to his rank as a midshipman on 15 March. On 31 May the crew of Impetueux (who already had a reputation for insubordination) mutinied unsuccessfully against Pellew in Bantry Bay. Hart was midshipman of the watch at the time the mutiny started and identified a number of the mutineers at the court martial in June. While spending most of his time in Impetueux on the blockade of Belle Île, Hart distinguished himself on several occasions. On 29 July he took part in the successful cutting out of the French brig Cerbere in Port Louis and then on 29 August he participated in the similar cutting out of the French brig La Guépe, which was "desperately defended", in Vigo Bay. He also served in the Ferrol Expedition in August; while Impetueux bombarded fortifications he was given command of a small flat-bottomed boat and brought troops ashore on the beaches of the landings.

Hart left Impetueux when the Peace of Amiens began in 1802, joining instead the ship of the line HMS Foudroyant which was the flagship of Admiral Lord Keith in the Mediterranean Fleet. He completed his necessary time of service as a midshipman on Foudroyant and was made an acting lieutenant on 2 April 1802 in the frigate HMS Medusa under Captain John Gore, still in the Mediterranean. His new rank was confirmed on 12 June. He spent the rest of the Peace sailing on Medusa visiting all the French and Spanish ports in the Sea and acting as an escort to important personages such as Ferdinand IV and Sir William Drummond. Hart rose to become the first lieutenant of Medusa. As such on one occasion after the Napoleonic Wars had begun, Medusa discovered two French privateer feluccas chasing the British cutter British Fair off Gibraltar. Upon the attack of Medusa the feluccas split up and attempted to flee but as Medusa passed the first of them closely Hart was ordered to board her and he did so successfully while Medusa destroyed the other ship with her guns. The action was witnessed by Gibraltar's garrison and the crew were cheered by it as they returned. Hart continued in Medusa after this and as such participated in the action of 5 October 1804 where Medusa and three other frigates captured three Spanish frigates and destroyed a fourth in the Atlantic Ocean.

The following November Medusa captured the Spanish frigate Matilda which had on board a cargo of quicksilver worth £200,000. Hart was given command of Matilda and sailed her into Portsmouth where she and her cargo could be further evaluated. Re-joining Medusa soon after, he sailed on 15 April 1805 to India with the new Governor-General of India, Lord Cornwallis on board, and arrived there in July. His old captain Edward Pellew, described as his "sincere and valuable friend", was now a rear-admiral and Commander-in-Chief, East Indies and with Hart in Madras he took him from Medusa to serve as his flag lieutenant on board the ship of the line HMS Culloden. (Note: Pellew often looked to advance the careers of the men who had served with him on Indefatigable with Culloden's first, second, and sixth lieutenants and master all having served as such.) Hart continued to serve as such until August 1806 when, still a lieutenant, Pellew began to appoint him to a series of acting commands on the station.

=== Acting commands ===
Hart's first acting command came when he was given command of the frigate HMS Terpsichore as one of a series of lieutenants serving as her acting-captain after the death of her commanding officer in July. After having moved on from Terpsichore, Hart's next command came in 1807 when he was transferred to the acting-command of the frigate HMS Duncan before again being replaced in a rotation of acting-captains. Towards the end of 1807 Hart was again placed in an acting command role, this time of the frigate HMS Caroline. Caroline was serving with Pellew's squadron off Java and in August, before Hart's arrival, she had reconnoitred the Dutch-controlled port of Griessie and discovered Dutch ships of the line at anchor there. On 11 December Hart sailed Caroline with the rest of the squadron back to Griessie to attack it and destroy the Dutch force present.

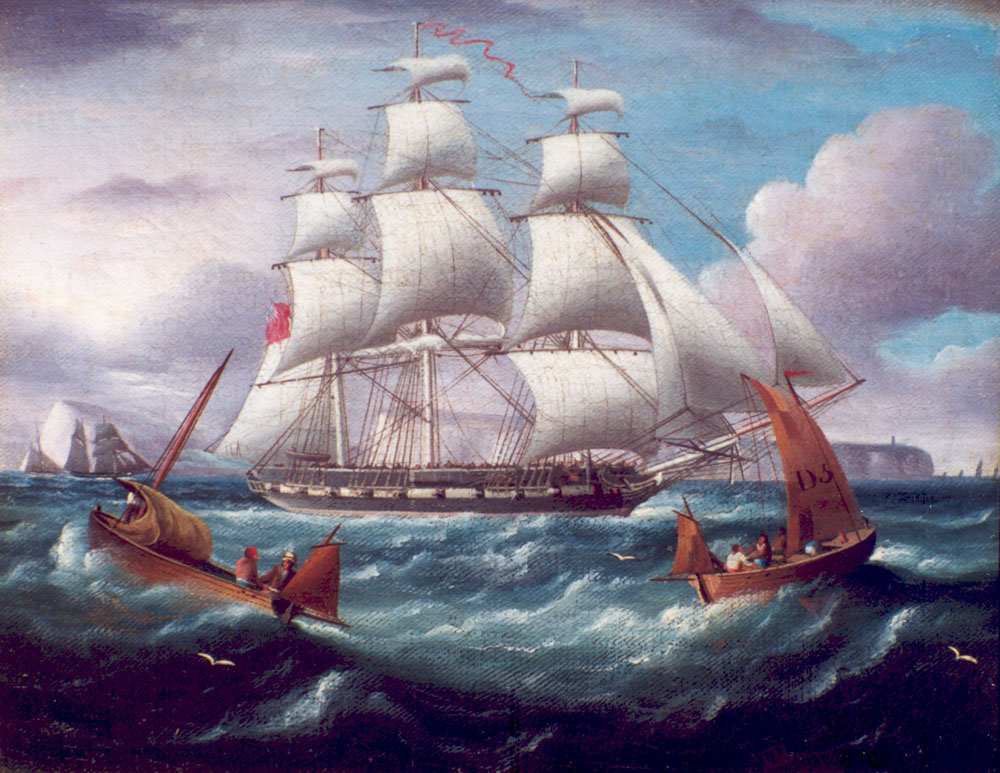
HMS Caroline, commanded by Hart in the Raid on Griessie

Hart was given command of the landings and of all seamen ashore during the attack, and he was successful in coordinating both of these aspects of the attack; the dockyard and storehouses were destroyed and the scuttled remains of the Dutch naval presence left in the East Indies burned. This came to be known as the Raid on Griessie. Caroline was used by Pellew as his flagship for some of the operation after Culloden grounded herself and her crew became intoxicated on a store of liquor. When Culloden grounded Caroline was directly astern of her and it was thought that Caroline would either hit Culloden or have to run herself ashore to escape that, but through the quick use of a spare anchor the crisis was averted just before Caroline hit the flagship's stern. Hart was praised for his good seamanship is avoiding the incident. Around the same time as the Raid, Hart cut out a Dutch 14-gun sloop-of-war from Java's coast in broad daylight and soon afterwards participated in an action against a number of batteries and gun boats in the mouth of Manila Bay.

Hart was superseded in command of Caroline by Captain Charles Gordon at the beginning of 1809 and was transferred to the acting-command of yet another frigate, HMS Fox. On 23 March Hart sent Fox's boats in to a creek where they captured the French 8-gun privateer La Carravanne which had been attempting to make the journey to Surabaya. Hart served in acting-command of Fox until 1811 when his health deteriorated to such an extent that he was forced to leave the East Indies and Pellew's command completely.

Having served as an acting-captain for four years Hart expected that he had by this time been promoted fully to post-captain but found upon his return to England that the First Lord of the Admiralty, Lord Mulgrave, had only signed off on his promotion to commander, dated 12 October 1807, for which he was "bitterly disappointed". This meant that despite extensive experience in command of frigates Hart was not of the correct rank to truly command one, and as such in November 1810 his next command was the sloop-of-war HMS Thracian, which he was given only after Mulgrave was replaced as First Lord by Charles Philip Yorke. In Thracian Hart served off the coast of Cherbourg for almost a year before being promoted to post-captain on 1 August 1811.

=== Post-captain ===
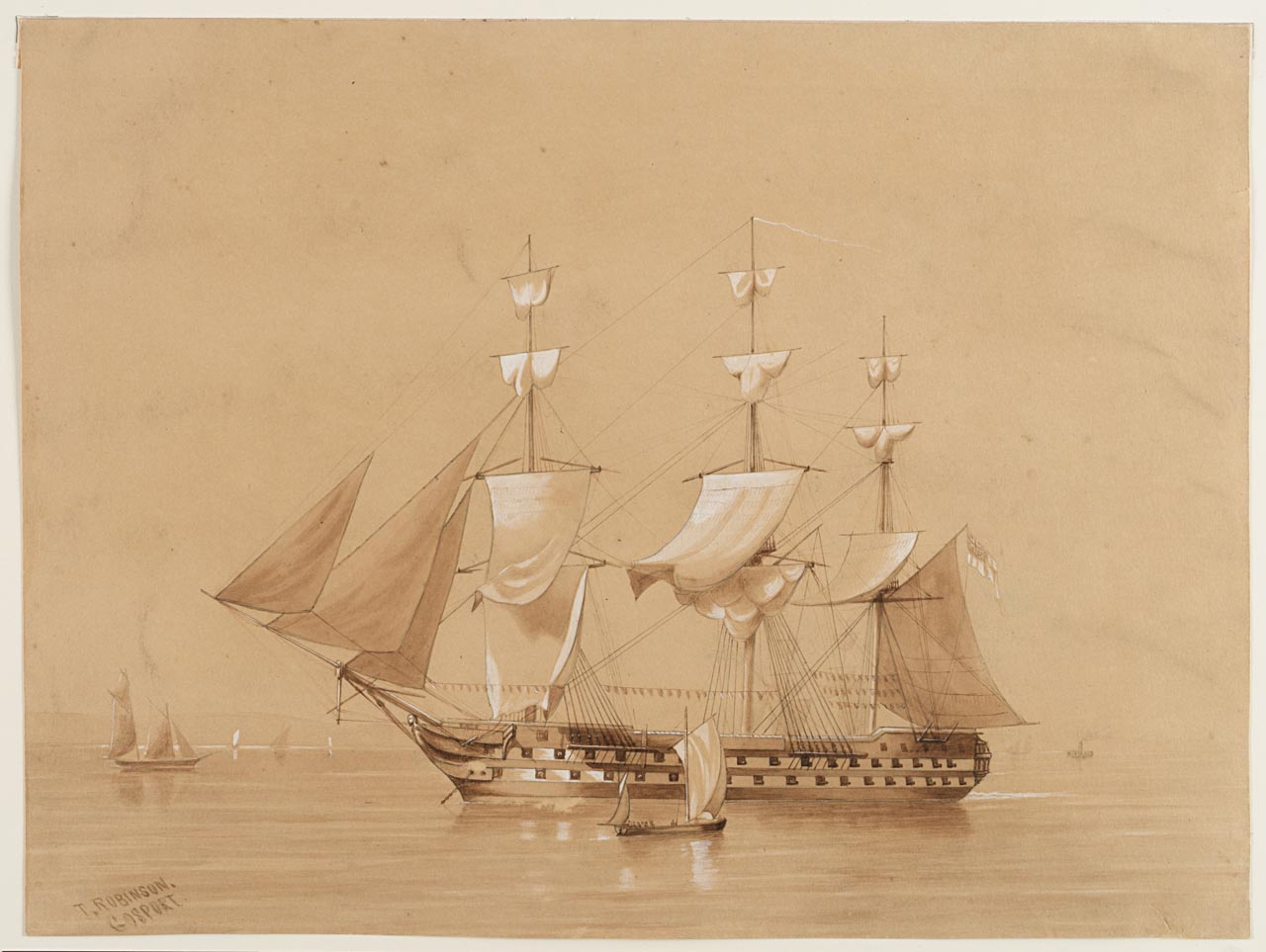
HMS Revenge, Hart's first command as a post-captain

While now a post-captain Hart did not receive immediate employment, possibly due to his ill health; again he relied on the favour of one of his old commanders, this time of the newly promoted Rear-Admiral Sir John Gore. Gore had been given a flagship, the ship of the line HMS Revenge, in the Mediterranean Fleet and chose Hart as his flag captain. In order to facilitate this transfer Hart was given acting-command, on 10 December 1813, of the post ship HMS Cyrus which was fitting out at Plymouth Dockyard to also join the Mediterranean Fleet. He joined the fleet in early 1814 and subsequently took command of Revenge on the Cádiz blockade and in the Adriatic Sea. As such he took part in the blockade of Venice from 22 March which ended when Italy was surrendered by France, at which point the squadron Hart was a part of sailed for Corfu to oversee the handover of that island from the French to Britain on 8 June. This process was completed on 28 June and two days later the squadron went to Minorca from where Hart and Revenge sailed for Spithead on 16 August, Gore having resigned his command upon the end of hostilities. Hart paid off Revenge at Chatham Dockyard in the same month and again found himself unemployed. (Note: It is likely that this unemployment was not planned by the Admiralty for Hart had not been expected to bring Revenge home; Gore had been sent an order to continue in command of his squadron in Revenge despite the new peace with France, but returned to England before he received it.)

After four years on land he was given command of the frigate HMS Sapphire on 27 August 1818. Soon after his assumption of command Hart took Sapphire to the Leeward Islands Station. Hart and Sapphire sailed for Latin America to watch over British interests in Porto Bello to secure them against the Spanish American wars of independence igniting in the continent. Here he observed Gregor MacGregor's attack and capture of the port in April 1819. While stationed in the Leeward Islands Hart accomplished a number of minor feats, including successfully crossing the Isthmus of Panama in only two days and acting as judge in a landmark case in Jamaica which saw two slave traders prosecuted for violating the Slave Trade Act 1807. Soon after these events Hart was sent in Sapphire on a diplomatic mission to Cartagena where he assisted the Governor-General of South America who had escaped there from Mexico due to the Mexican War of Independence. This was his last major service in the Americas before his health began to severely decline; this forced him to relinquish his command and return home to England, which he did by travelling as a passenger on the frigate HMS Tartar, arriving on 28 August 1820. He would spend the next ten years ashore unemployed.

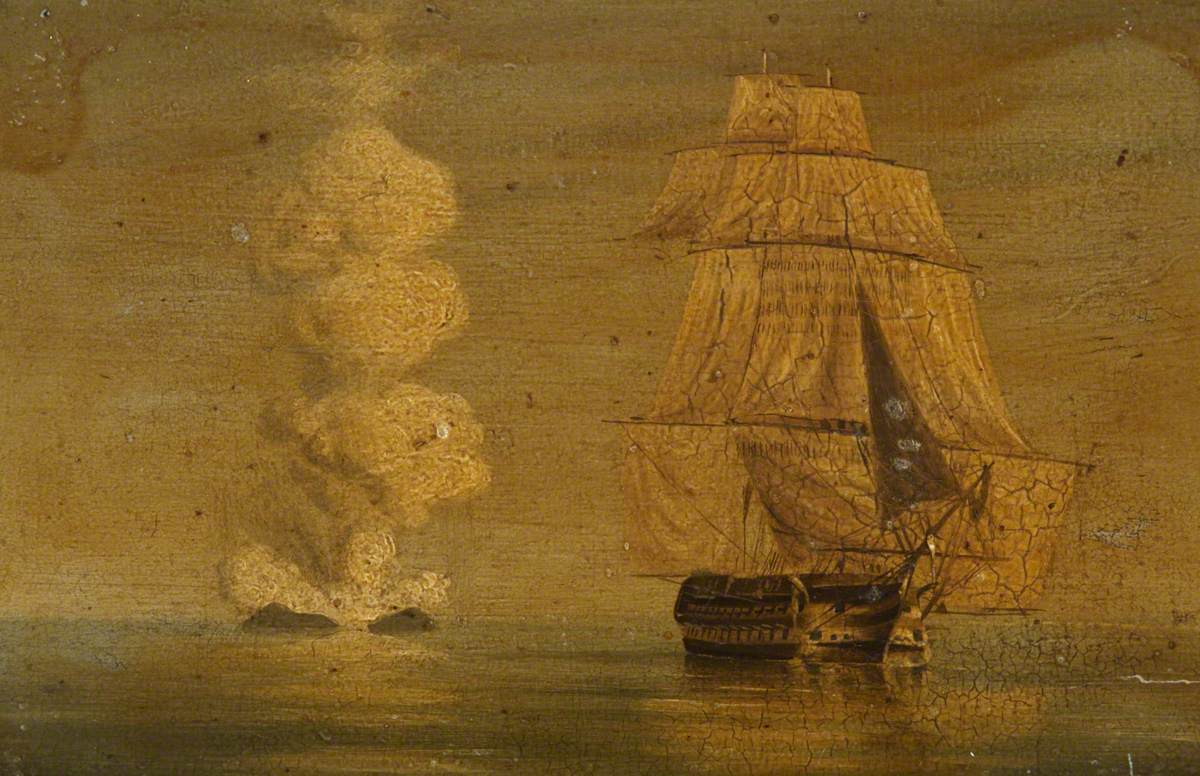
HMS Melville in 1831 prior to Hart assuming command

In 1831 the East Indies and China Station was created and the now Vice-Admiral Sir John Gore was appointed as its first commander-in-chief. For his flag-captain he again chose Hart who took command of Gore's flagship, the ship of the line HMS Melville, on 30 September. In 1833 the vice-admiral gave Hart temporary command of the frigate HMS Imogene to sail to Zanzibar to speak with the Imaum of Muscat, Said bin Sultan, about the United States' monopoly on trade with that country and the possibility of British trade links being created. Arriving in early 1834, his negotiations were successful and upon his departure from Zanzibar he was given the ex-East Indiaman Liverpool, which had been converted into a ship of the line, as a gift for William IV. As well as this Hart was personally gifted an arabian horse which was put on board Liverpool. He escorted the ship to Bombay from where she was sailed home to become HMS Imaum. After returning from Zanzibar he wrote a report on his negotiations that reassured the British establishment, with the imaum's political allegiance to Britain still strong and his relationship with America purely commercial.

Hart returned to England in Melville in July 1835, transporting the previous Governor of Bombay Lord Clare, when Gore's tenure as commander-in-chief ended. He paid Melville off on 22 July and in reward for his services was subsequently made a Knight Commander of the Royal Guelphic Order on 25 January 1836 and a Knight Bachelor on 23 February, giving him the title of Sir Henry Hart. Melville was Hart's last active command in the Royal Navy; he received a Captain's Good-Service Pension on 12 April 1842 to further honour his service.

=== Flag rank and retirement ===
In 1845 Hart was appointed a commissioner of Greenwich Hospital, London; a year later on 1 October 1846 he was promoted as a retired rear-admiral. Hart was not kept on the active list of the navy because of an Admiralty regulation that required post-captains who held civil posts to either accept retirement when promoted, instead of staying on the active list, or lose their civil post. Hart was against being placed on the retired list, a position "foreign to his feelings", but felt that that was the only option available to him. Sir George Pechell brought up Hart's case in parliament in 1850, noting that other officers such as Sir Watkin Owen Pell, who Hart had served alongside as a commissioner, had not been forced to retire as Hart had; despite this precedent Hart was not reinstated on the active list and as such was never promoted higher than rear-admiral.

== Other work ==
In the early 1840s Hart accompanied his friend Lord Prudhoe on a diplomatic mission to the United States and Canada, arriving in New York in July 1841 before making the journey to Halifax. Hart returned from the mission in October so that he could attend the wedding of Admiral (now Lord Exmouth) Pellew's granddaughter Harriet in London. Hart continued his active life into professional retirement; he patented a mode of curing smoking chimneys in 1848, using a wheel placed in a chimney and operated by a weather vane to remove smoke, for which the Society of Arts awarded him their Isis Medal in 1850. He also served on the committee of The Marine Society and was a senior member of the United Service Club. Possibly influenced by his judicial work on the behalf of slaves in Jamaica, Hart supported a number of charitable endeavours in later life including the Merchant Seamans' Orphan Asylum. He also supported, in tandem with his wife, a number of organisations set up to assist destitute women through either funding or emigration.

== Death ==
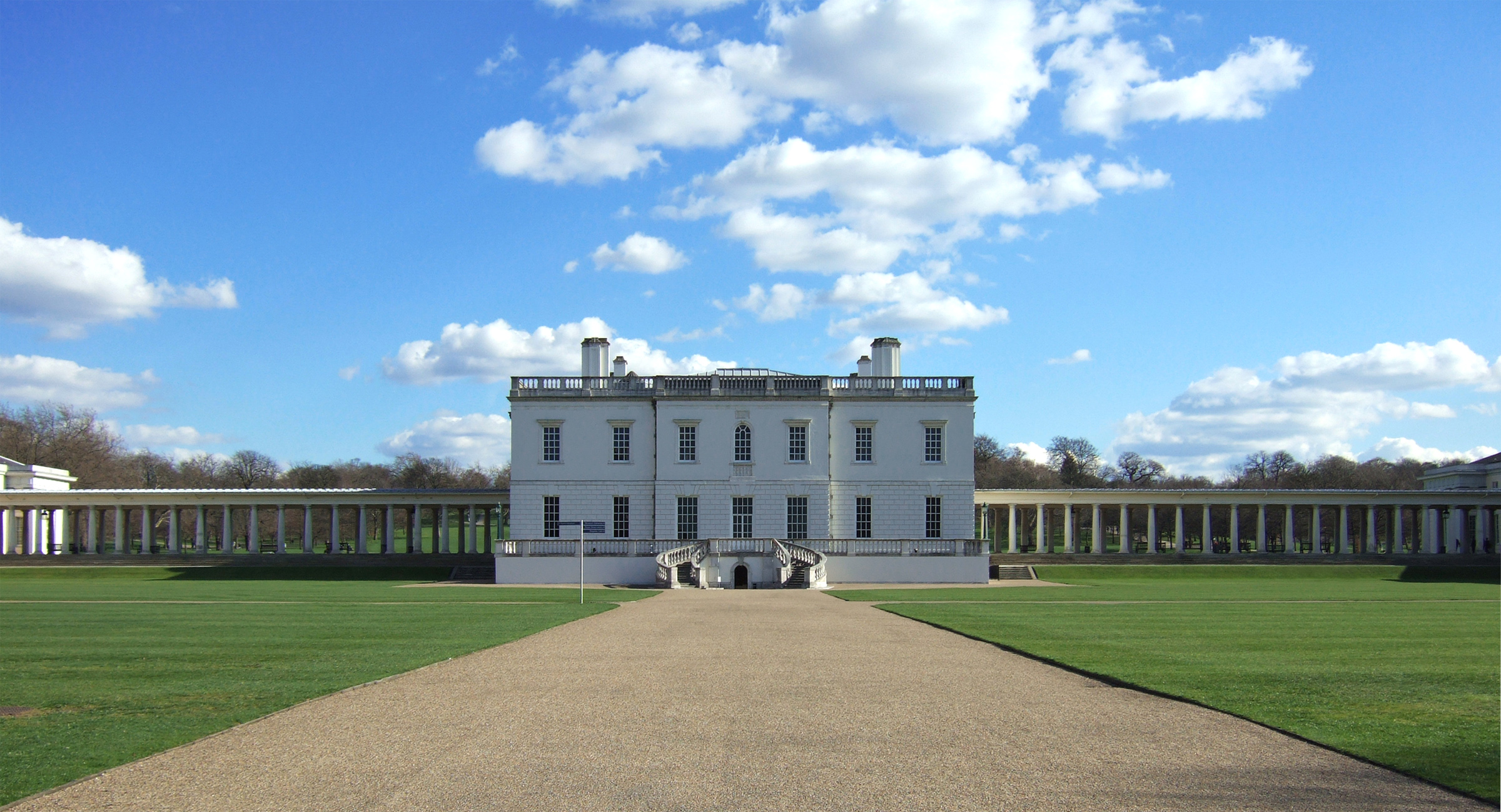
Queen's House, where Hart died in 1856

Hart died at Queen's House, Greenwich, on 22 December 1856 at the age of seventy-six. He is remembered on a memorial, dedicated to the senior officers of the Greenwich Hospital, in the Old Burial Ground of the Naval Hospital.

== Family ==
While on station in the East Indies Hart married Maria, the daughter of Andrew Williams of Southampton, in Fort St. George on 4 October 1808. As such he became a relation of Sir Edward Page-Turner who was married to the bride's sister. The couple had no children and upon Hart's death he bequeathed his estate to his wife and nephew, also named Henry Hart.
