= Navy of the Kingdom of Holland =

Navy of Holland from 1806 to 1813

- Marine van het Koninkrijk Holland
- The navy's ensign from 1807 to 1813
- Active: 1806–1813
- Country: Kingdom of Holland
- Branch: Navy
- Engagements: Napoleonic Wars; Java campaign of 1806–1807; Walcheren Campaign

Commanders
- Notable commanders: Carel Hendrik Ver Huell; Jan Willem de Winter; Jan Hendrik van Kinsbergen; Gerrit Verdooren van Asperen; Pieter Hartsinck; Arnold Adriaan Buyskes

The navy of the Kingdom of Holland (Dutch: marine van het Koninkrijk Holland) existed from 1806 to 1813. Founded in June 1806 after Napoleon transformed the Batavian Commonwealth into a kingdom ruled by his brother Louis Bonaparte, the navy inherited its ships from the Batavian Navy, which had been severely weakened by mutinies and British naval attacks. Most of the kingdom's navy was blockaded in European ports by the Royal Navy, and its Dutch East Indies squadron was destroyed in the British Java campaign of 1806–1807. Napoleon annexed Holland into France in 1810, though its navy was not incorporated into the French navy and continued to exist until the Royal Netherlands Navy was founded in 1813.

== History ==
Founded in June 1806 after the Batavian Commonwealth was transformed by Napoleon into a kingdom ruled by his brother Louis Bonaparte, the navy of the Kingdom of Holland assumed control over the ships and administrative infrastructure of the Batavian Navy, which in 1805 consisted of 15 ships of the line, 10 frigates and three corvettes. The historian Niklas Frykman described the Batavian Navy as a "third-rate force", having been weakened by a series of mutinies and losing much of its fleet to British naval attacks or accidents. Most of the new navy's sailors were recruited from Friesland, Zeeland or abroad. Like its Batavian predecessor, the new navy recruited officers from the merchant marine to fill open positions.

For the duration of its existence, most of the kingdom's navy, like the Batavian Navy before it, was blockaded in European ports by the British navy, and as such unable to put to sea. When Dutch warships managed to slip past the British blockades, "their voyages often ended in disaster". As a result, there were "[no] naval operations of importance... undertaken by Holland" during the French Revolutionary and Napoleonic Wars. As the Dutch East India Company had been liquidated in 1799 and its assets taken over by the state, the kingdom's navy was also responsible for defending the Dutch East Indies. Vice-admiral Carel Hendrik Ver Huell was appointed by Louis as Minister of the Navy in 1806.

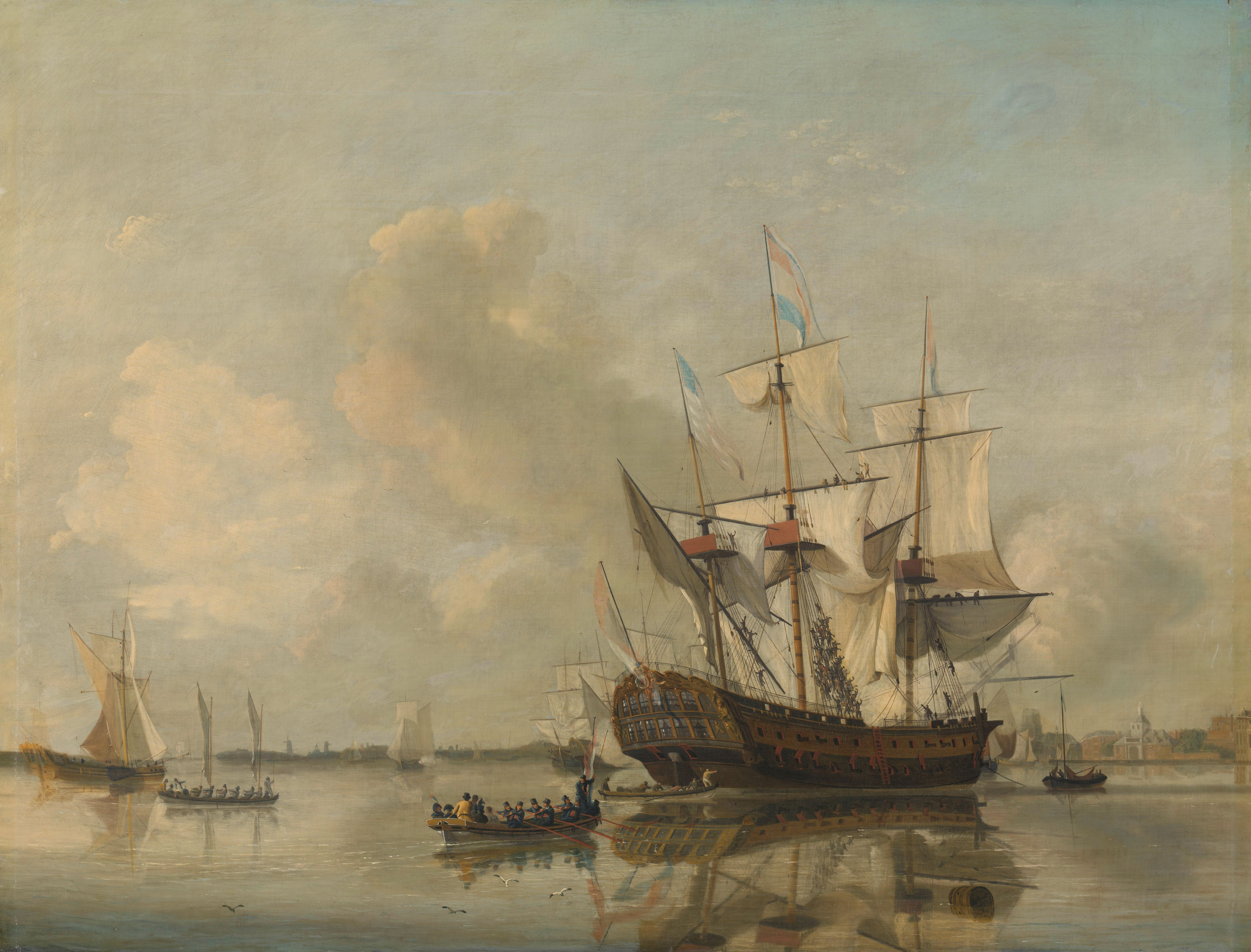
1807 painting of the Dutch frigate Rotterdam on the Meuse

The navy's Texel and Amsterdam squadrons mutinied in August 1806 after the Batavian flag was introduced onboard their ships, with mutineers refusing to swear an oath of allegiance to Louis or obey orders by their officers. Dutch authorities immediately moved to suppress the mutiny; to placate the mutineers, officials ordered the Statenvlag to be hoisted aboard their ships, which brought the mutiny to an end. The Statenvlag subsequently became the navy's de facto ensign, which was made official by a decree Louis issued on 1 December 1807 which renamed the flag as the Koninklijke Hollandsche Vlag ("Royal Flag of Holland"). However, some of the navy's units, such the Zeeland squadron, continued to sail under the Batavian flag.

In 1802, a squadron of 10 ships under Vice-admiral Pieter Hartsinck was sent to Batavia. Once it arrived at Batavia in 1804, Hartsinck's squadron, which did little beyond patrolling northern Java out of Surabaya, quickly deteriorated from a lack of supplies and manpower. In the Java campaign of 1806–1807, the squadron was tracked down and destroyed in a series of targeted attacks by British naval forces under Rear-admiral Sir Edward Pellew, who was concerned about the threat it posed to British shipping in the region. From 1808 to 1811, Governor-General Herman Daendels attempted to rebuild Dutch naval strength in the East Indies by building several gunboats, though this failed to prevent the British from occupying Java in 1811.

In 1807, a suspicious Louis dismissed Ver Huell as Minister of the Navy and appointed him as the Dutch ambassador to France. Two years later, Ver Huell temporarily took command of the kingdom's navy and resisted the British attack on Walcheren in concert with French forces. Napoleon, angered by the Dutch military's poor performance, annexed Holland to France on 9 July 1810. The navy, then numbering 13 ships of the line, five frigates and four corvettes, was however never incorporated into the French Imperial Navy. In 1813, Russo-Prussian troops liberated Holland from French rule during the War of the Sixth Coalition, with the newly-established United Netherlands establishing the Royal Netherlands Navy in the same year. Under the terms of the 1814 Treaty of Paris, the naval squadrons at Den Helder and Antwerp were transferred to the Royal Netherlands Navy.
