= Benjamin William Page =

Royal Navy Admiral (1765–1845)

Admiral Benjamin William Page
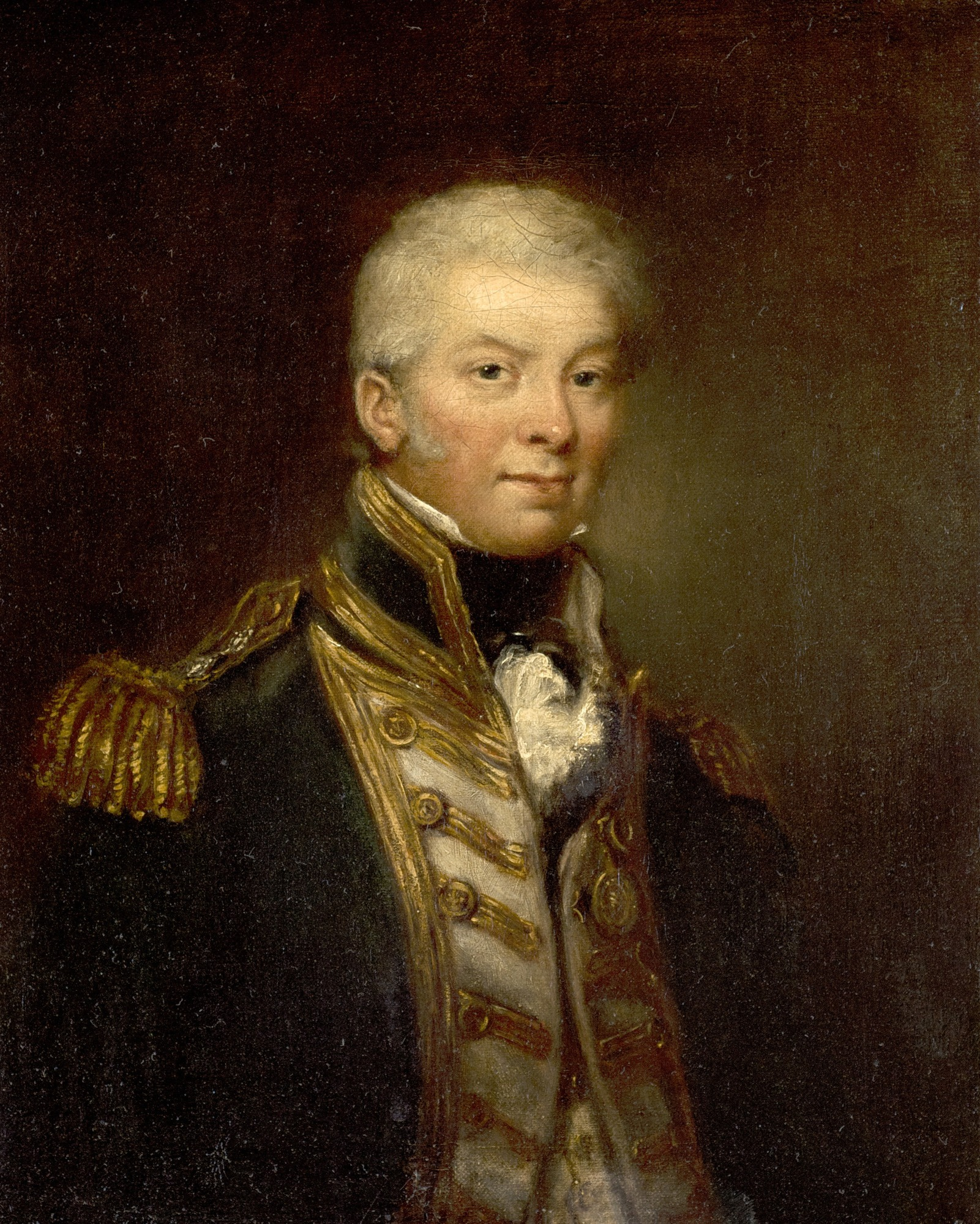
- Page in the early 1800s
- Born: 7 February 1765; Ipswich
- Died: 3 October 1845 (aged 80); Ipswich
- Military career
- Allegiance: United Kingdom
- Branch: Royal Navy
- Service years: 1778–1845
- Rank: Admiral
- Commands: HMS Suffolk; HMS Hobart; HMS Orpheus; HMS Inflexible; HMS Caroline; HMS Trident; Harwich Sea Fencibles; HMS Puissant
- Conflicts: American Revolutionary War; Battle of Sadras; Battle of Providien; Battle of Negapatam; Battle of Trincomalee; Battle of Cuddalore; French Revolutionary War; Invasion of Ceylon; Blockade of Genoa; Battle of Abukir; Blockade of Alexandria; Napoleonic Wars
- Awards: Order of the Crescent (Ottoman)

Admiral Benjamin William Page (7 February 1765 – 3 October 1845) was a Royal Navy officer of the eighteenth and nineteenth centuries who served extensively on the East Indies Station. He joined the Royal Navy in 1778 on board the flagship of Rear-Admiral Sir Edward Hughes, his patron. He sailed with Hughes to the East Indies and participated in the series of naval battles against the French that culminated in the Battle of Cuddalore in 1783. Page returned to England in 1785 and was promoted to lieutenant. His first appointment as such was in the frigate HMS Astraea commanded by Captain Peter Rainier. Rainier also became a patron of Page, who transferred with him to the ship of the line HMS Monarch in 1790 and then recommended him for further employment elsewhere. After another period of service in the East Indies, Page was again taken up by Rainier as a lieutenant, this time on the ship of the line HMS Suffolk, in 1793. Page served as Rainier's temporary flag captain in Suffolk and fought at the invasion of Ceylon in 1795 before being given command of the sloop HMS Hobart. In Hobart Page used his extensive knowledge of the East Indies to navigate Rainier's fleet to the Moluccas and Amboyna Island, which they captured.

Page was given command of the frigate HMS Orpheus in 1797 and soon after promoted to post captain. He was forced to leave the East Indies in 1798 due to his declining health, and took up his next appointment, as captain of the troopship HMS Inflexible, in 1800. In Inflexible he served in the Mediterranean Sea, supporting the blockades of Genoa and Alexandria and participating in the Battle of Abukir. After leaving Inflexible in 1802 Page was given command of the frigate HMS Caroline. In Caroline he brought news of the Napoleonic Wars to the East Indies in 1803 and served there until 1805, successfully taking a number of privateers and protecting valuable East India Company convoys. Service in the East Indies having again damaged his health, Page did not receive another command until 1808 when he was given the Harwich Sea Fencibles until their disbanding in 1810. Page's last active service came when he commanded the guardship HMS Puissant at Spithead between 1812 and 1815. He was subsequently promoted by seniority to rear-admiral in 1819, vice-admiral in 1830, and admiral in 1841.

== Early life ==
Benjamin William Page was born on 7 February 1765 in Ipswich, Suffolk. His father was Benjamin Page and his mother Ann Aldrich. His father was a tailor and ship owner, as well as a friend of another Ipswich local, Rear-Admiral Sir Edward Hughes. He used his influence with the admiral to get Page and three other young boys into the Royal Navy under his patronage. On 20 November 1778, at the age of thirteen, he became a first-class volunteer in Hughes' flagship, the ship of the line HMS Superb.

== Naval career ==
=== Early career ===
==== First East Indies tour ====
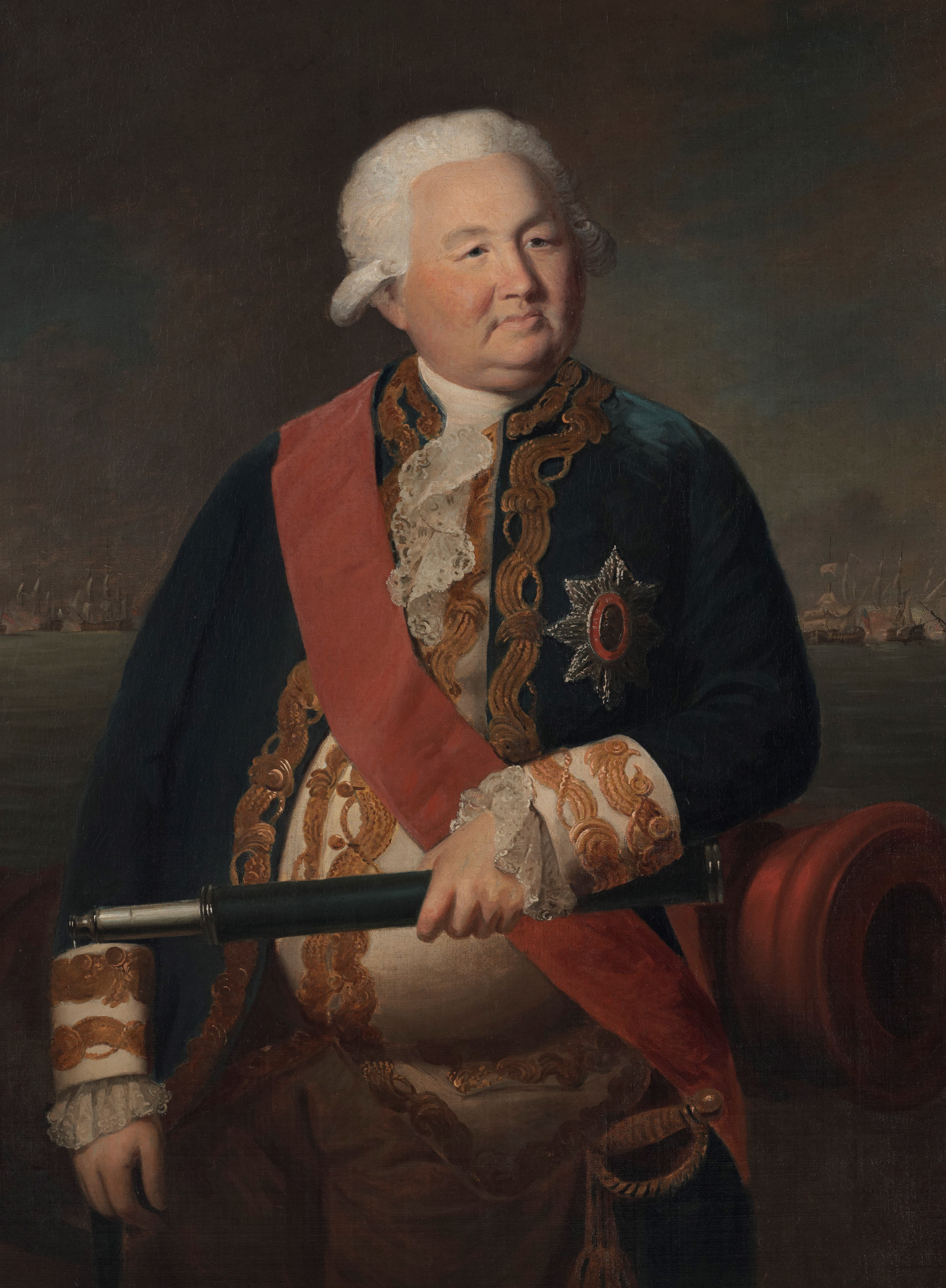
Admiral Sir Edward Hughes, Page's first naval patron

Superb sailed for the East Indies on 7 March 1779, where Hughes took command of the British fleet there to fight in the American Revolutionary War. Page participated on board Superb in the subsequent four battles, Sadras, Providien, Negapatam, and Trincomalee, fought between Hughes and the French admiral Pierre André de Suffren in 1782. He was injured twice in these battles, one being a severe wound to the leg and the other being considerable burns received during Providien. Page was a highly favoured junior officer on board Superb and as a result of this was appointed an acting lieutenant in the ship of the line HMS Exeter, another ship of Hughes' fleet, on 27 December.

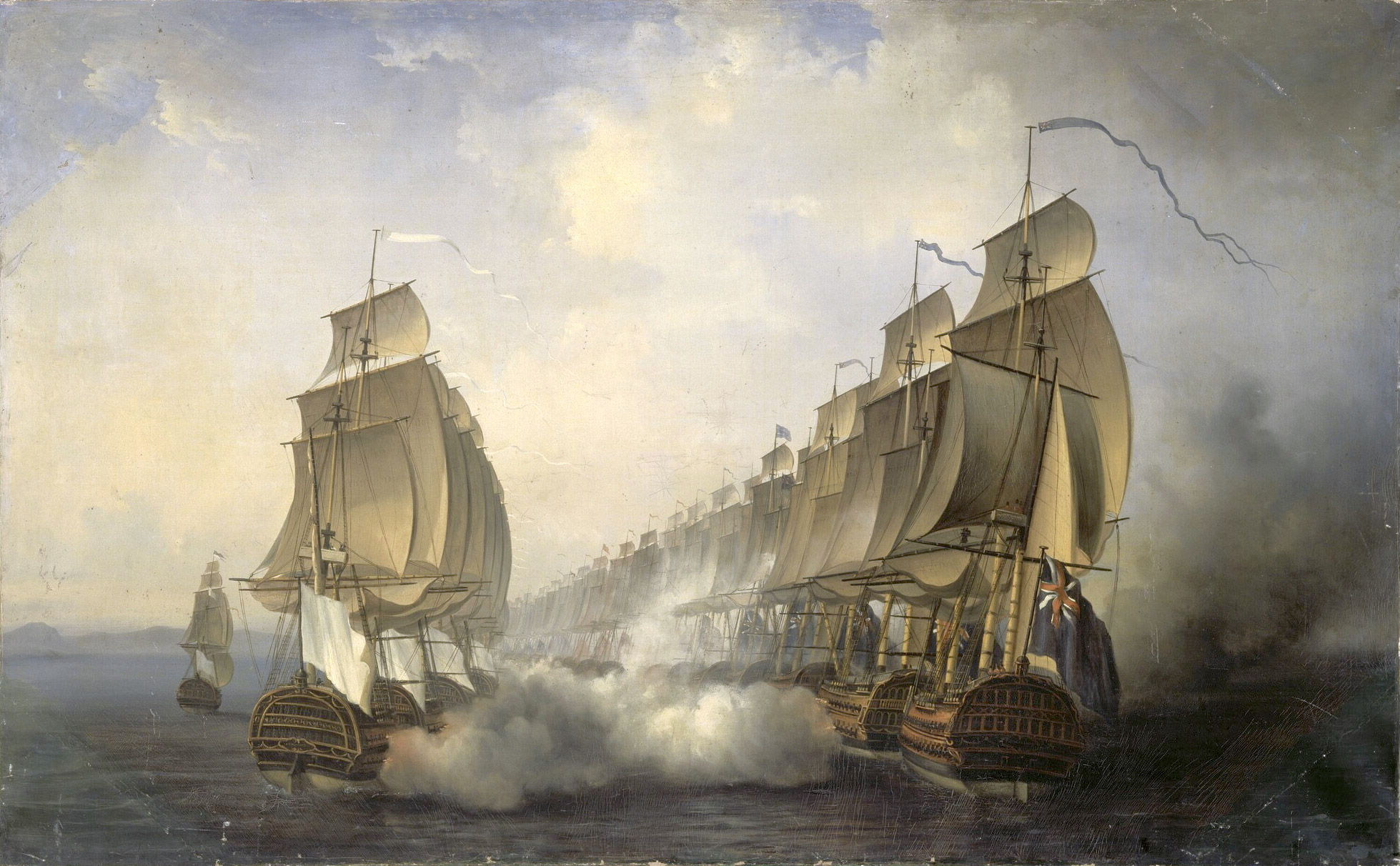
The Battle of Cuddalore, which Page fought in on HMS Exeter

In Exeter Page fought at the final naval action between the fleets of Hughes and Suffren, the Battle of Cuddalore on 20 June 1783, before the war ended. Exeter was ordered home at this point in time, but having the support of Hughes, Page was kept on in the Indies. Hughes managed this by at first transferring Page to the ship of the line HMS Worcester in August and then to the cutter HMS Lizard in February 1784, still an acting lieutenant. Page was the only lieutenant on board Lizard and as such was forced to develop as an independent officer quickly. He was so successful in his role in Lizard that Captain George Courtenay of the post ship HMS Eurydice requested that Page be appointed to his ship, he having no lieutenants.

Page joined Eurydice in September and returned to England in her in July 1785, where he received his long-awaited confirmation as a lieutenant from Lord Howe, backdated to 20 November 1784. Page was appointed next to the frigate HMS Astraea on 19 October 1786 as her second lieutenant, serving on the Jamaica Station. Astraea was commanded by Captain Peter Rainier and Page became a follower of him, moving with Rainier to the ship of the line HMS Monarch in the English Channel, when he was given command of her on 26 June 1790 during the Spanish Armament. (Note: Page was assisted in his rise through the ranks by the naval patronage of Hughes and Rainier, but also received the support of Horatio Nelson, who would go on to correspond with him in 1802 and 1803 so that Page could return the favour and assist in the training of a protégé of a political friend of Nelson's.)

==== Second and third East Indies tours ====
Page left Monarch soon after as he was recommended by Rainier to Captain Robert Sutton of the frigate HMS Minerva. He joined Minerva on 23 December and three days later the ship sailed for the East Indies Station. While on station he was moved from Minerva to serve in the ship of the line HMS Crown, which was the flagship of the commander-in-chief Commodore William Cornwallis, in August 1791. Page left the East Indies when Crown sailed home in July 1792. He stayed ashore unemployed by the navy until 9 January 1793 when his patron Rainier, now a commodore, was given command of the ship of the line HMS Suffolk and he was chosen as Suffolk's first lieutenant. Suffolk at first served in the Channel Fleet of Lord Howe, but on 26 April 1794 Page again sailed for the East Indies, as part of the escort to a large convoy, with Rainier becoming commander-in-chief in the East Indies upon their arrival there.

As a commodore Rainier was meant to have a flag captain serving under him in Suffolk but none was present, and so Page was unusually given the pay of a commander and held the role temporarily. As such he participated in the invasion of Ceylon from 21 July 1795 which was coordinated by Rainier. Page was further rewarded after this when Rainier gave him command of the recently captured and renamed sloop HMS Hobart, in September of the same year, as her acting captain with the corresponding rank of acting commander. His first action as captain of Hobart was to coordinate with a detachment of the 52nd Regiment of Foot the capture of the Dutch factory of Molletive on 1 October. The site was undefended and captured quietly by the force.

The next action of Rainier's fleet was to capture the Moluccas. Page was by now on his third tour of the East Indies and was known to be an expert on the seas of the area; as such he was chosen to navigate the fleet through the difficult passages leading to the islands, doing so in January 1796. The islands were captured without resistance and the force sailed on to attack Amboyna Island, but before Amboyna was taken Page was sent to Madras with dispatches recently captured from a Dutch brig of war and so he missed out on the prize money resulting from the final capitulation. Having commanded Hobart as an acting commander for half a year, he was promoted to the full rank on 12 April. In December he escorted a valuable convoy of Chinese merchant ships from Prince of Wales Island to Bombay, for which he received the thanks of the government and the merchants. The latter group also gave him a present of 500 guineas in thanks for his service.

=== Post-captain ===
==== Mediterranean campaigns ====
Page continued to command Hobart until 27 February 1797 when he was given acting command of the frigate HMS Orpheus after her captain died on station. His command was made permanent with his promotion to post captain on 22 December of the same year, and he stayed in the East Indies with Orpheus until he was ordered home to England, his health having severely declined, in August 1798. (Note: One of his issues was a large swelling in the right knee, which was treated in 1799.) Having regained his health, Page was appointed to the ship of the line HMS Inflexible on 21 January 1800. The ship was armed en flute as a troopship throughout his command, with only the guns on her upper deck remaining in situ and a large portion of her crew having been removed. Inflexible sailed with a part of the 17th Regiment of Foot on board on 8 April in a troop convoy which Page was senior officer of. They sailed to the Mediterranean Sea and landed their soldiers at Minorca on 13 May, after which Inflexible was employed as a storeship on the blockade of Genoa. Genoa surrendered on 4 June but the day before Page and Inflexible had been sent from the blockade on a special service to Leghorn, meaning that as previously at Amboyna he was deprived of any prize money resulting from the success. Page then assisted in taking the injured and unwell men among the surrendered French soldiers to Antibes.

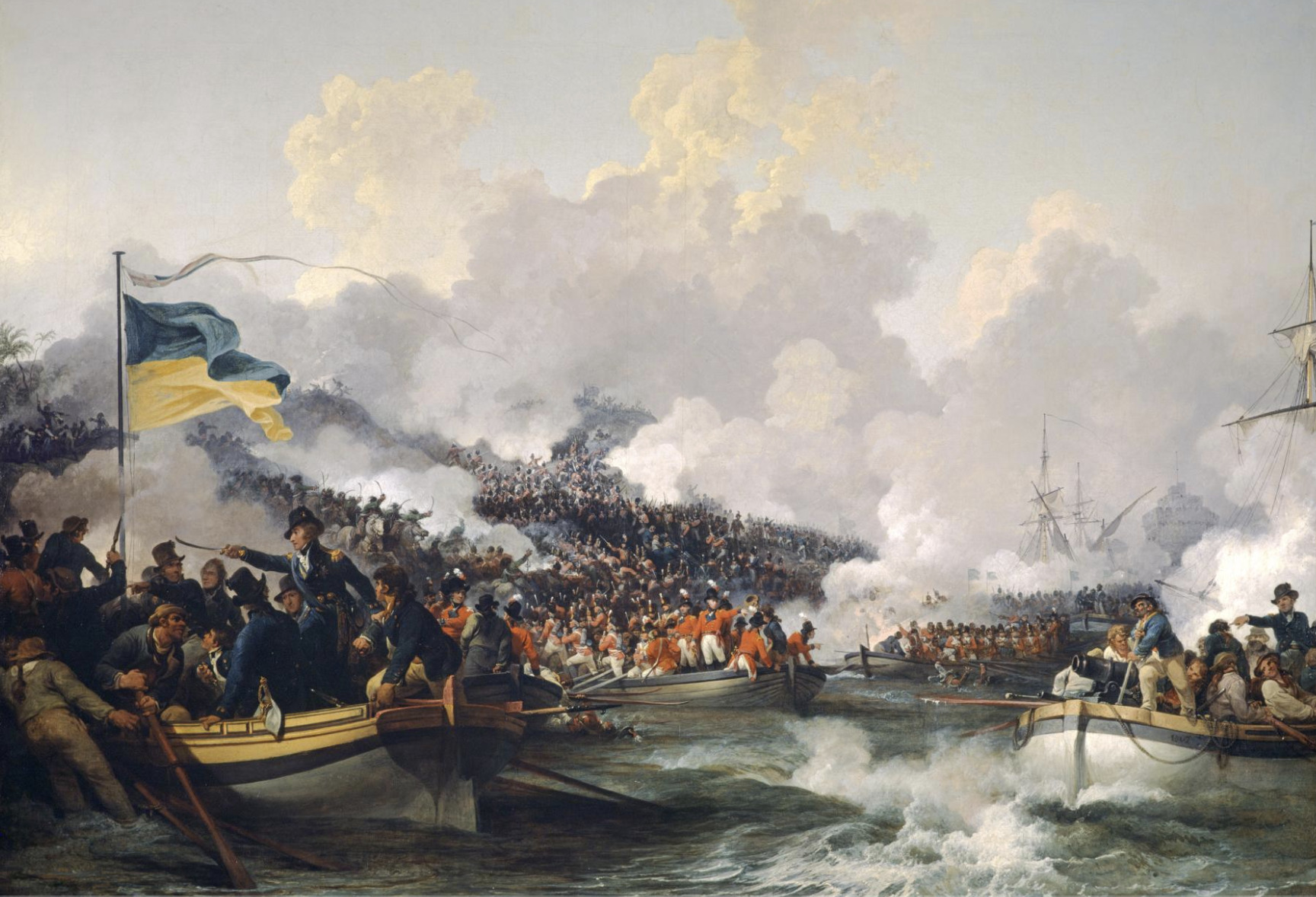
The Landing of British Troops at Aboukir by Philip James de Loutherbourg. British soldiers go ashore at the Battle of Abukir on 8 March 1801

Inflexible returned to England with a large convoy on 4 August. Page was ordered back to the Mediterranean to give sealed orders to Admiral Lord Keith in September. Having done so Keith embarked a portion of a battalion of the 42nd Regiment of Foot on board Inflexible. These troops were intended for the fight against the French campaign in Egypt and Syria, and on 8 March 1801 Page landed them as part of the Battle of Abukir that saw Britain establish a military presence in Egypt. Having done her duty as a troopship, Inflexible was then attached to the force implementing the blockade of Alexandria. Page was detached from the blockade when Cairo fell in June to take command of the convoy conveying the 13,556 surrendered French soldiers to Marseille, and when Alexandria fell in August Page had still not returned from his mission, thus missing out on prize money from a victory for the third time. Despite this Page was one of the naval officers chosen to be rewarded for his service in the campaign by the Ottoman Empire, and on 8 October he and a number of other officers were created Knights of the Order of the Crescent by Küçük Hüseyin Pasha in an extravagant ceremony. After this he sailed Inflexible home carrying Major-General Sir Eyre Coote and the 1st Battalion of the 3rd Regiment of Guards. He left Inflexible in February 1802, as the Peace of Amiens began, and went on half pay. (Note: Also recorded as leaving Inflexible in March.)

==== Fourth East Indies tour ====
On 9 November Page was given command of the frigate HMS Caroline, in which he served for the remainder of the Peace on the Irish Station. In May 1803 he was sent in the frigate, with secret orders announcing the start of the Napoleonic Wars, to the East Indies where his patron the now Vice-Admiral Rainier was still commander-in-chief. (Note: Page had only one hour to react to his orders before setting sail for the East Indies and as such Caroline served there with equipment meant only for the Irish Station that was never replaced.) The war being very new, Page was able to use his awareness to his advantage, taking a number of French merchant vessels and detaining two ships of the Batavian Republic as droits of admiralty on the voyage. Another capture made was the brig of war De Haasje on 2 August 1803, which had been carrying dispatches from Napoleon; De Haasje was sent in to Saint Helena where the alarm of war was raised, causing the detention of a number of Batavian merchants in the harbour there. Upon arriving on station 103 days after leaving Cork, Page was able to use his local knowledge of the East Indies and his position as senior naval officer to successfully convoy ships of the East India Company through the Bay of Bengal for several months. While doing so he captured two French privateers; Les Freres Unis on 5 January 1804 and then Le General du Caen on 4 February. The two privateers had only recently arrived from France upon their capture and had not had time to attack British shipping as had been their goal. In gratitude for his service, the merchants of Bombay and Madras each presented Page with gifts of 500 guineas.

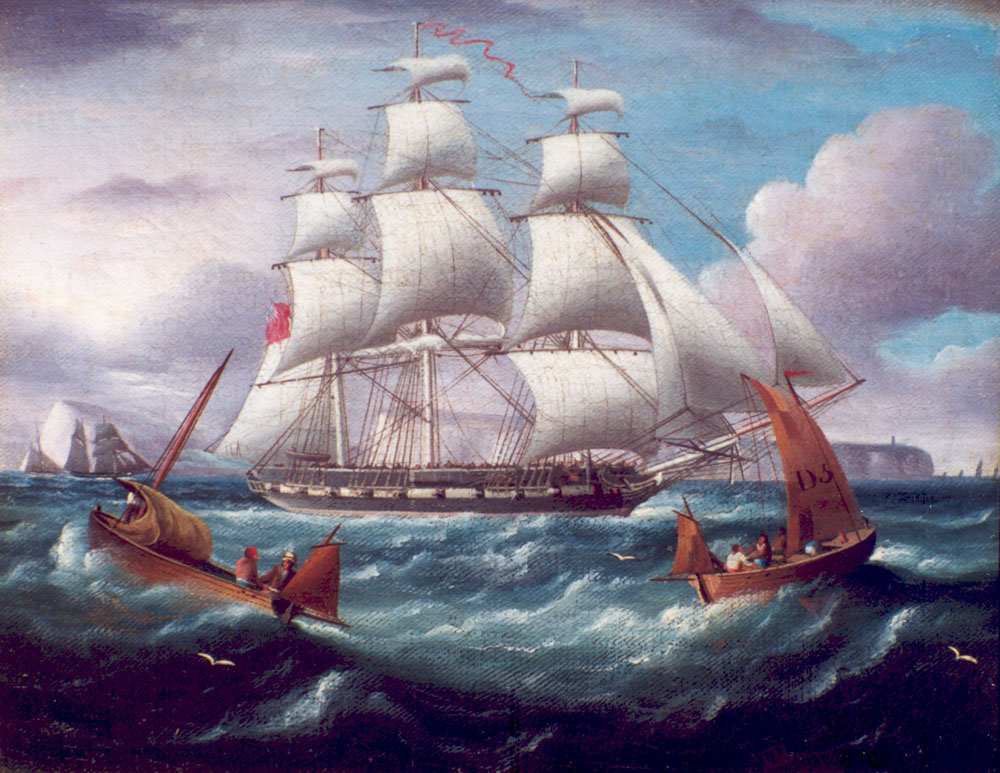
Painting of the frigate HMS Caroline by Thomas Buttersworth

On 15 February the convoy of Commodore Nathaniel Dance was attacked by a force commanded by the French admiral Charles-Alexandre Léon Durand Linois, and while they were successful in escaping, Rainier expected Linois to attack more convoys. To combat this, Page was given command over the ship of the line HMS Grampus, frigate HMS Dedaigneuse, and sloop HMS Dasher to form a squadron for the protection of a valuable convoy sailing to and from China. Page successfully conveyed the convoy to Canton and back to the East Indies without meeting Linois, arriving back on station in January 1805.

==== Home service ====
Page commanded Caroline until 26 February 1805 when he was translated into the ship of the line HMS Trident, which was the flagship of Rainier, to serve as flag captain. Page sailed Trident home to be paid off in October when Rainier's term as commander-in-chief ended, and at the same time acted as escort to a convoy of 44 ships. Upon arriving in England the Court of Directors of the East India Company presented him with 500 guineas for this service. Having served so often in the East Indies, Page's health had severely deteriorated and as such he was not offered another command immediately. He remained unemployed until 10 May 1808 when he was given command of the Harwich Sea Fencibles, a form of naval militia. He commanded them until they were disbanded in 1810, at which point he went back on half pay. Page's last command came on 21 August 1812 when he was given the ship of the line HMS Puissant, which was the guardship at Spithead. As captain of this ship his role included presiding over 167 courts martial, controlling the nearby prison ships, and examining midshipmen in their candidacies for promotion to lieutenant. (Note: One of these courts martial was that of Lieutenant Henry Ducie Chads, the ranking surviving officer of the frigate HMS Java, in April 1813, investigating the loss of that ship to the American frigate USS Constitution.) Puissant also served as the flagship, and Page the flag captain, of Admiral Sir Richard Bickerton who was Commander-in-Chief, Portsmouth. He left Puissant in September 1815 when she was decommissioned. (Note: Also recorded as leaving Puissant in October.)

=== Flag rank ===
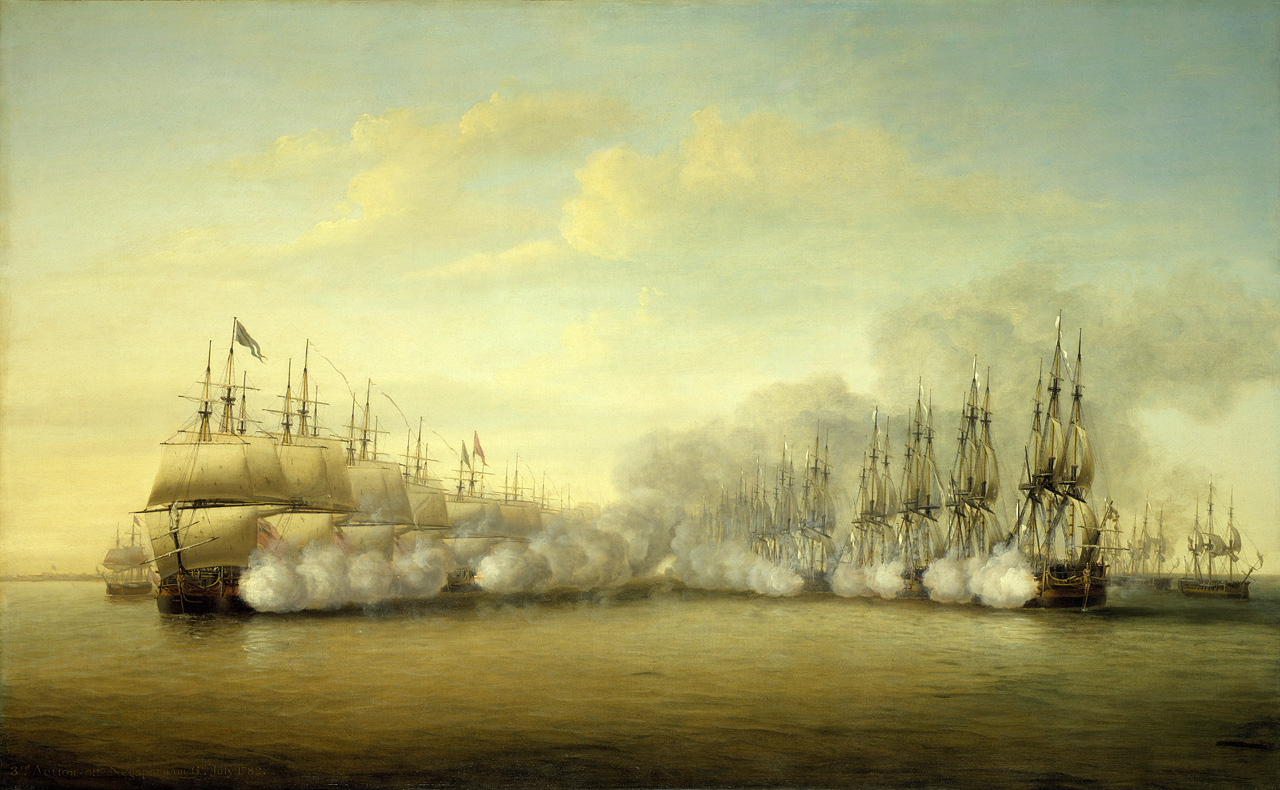
Battle of Negapatam, 6 July 1782, one of the paintings saved by Page

By seniority Page was promoted to rear-admiral on 12 August 1819, vice-admiral on 22 July 1830, and admiral on 23 November 1841. (Note: Full dates of flag rank: Rear-admiral of the blue 12 August 1819, rear-admiral of the white 27 May 1825, vice-admiral of the blue 22 July 1830, vice-admiral of the white 10 January 1837, admiral of the blue 23 November 1841.) He was never employed by the Royal Navy after reaching flag rank. Page continued to live in Ipswich through his retirement. He devoted a portion of his later life to protecting paintings of actions he and his patrons Hughes and Rainier had served in. In 1835 he discovered a series of eight paintings of Hughes' battles against Suffren by Dominic Serres hanging in some neglected corridors of the Greenwich Naval Hospital instead of in that building's painted hall where he had expected them to be. Angered by this, Page persuaded the hospital to give him the paintings in return for one larger painting, which ended up being a work by George Chambers on the Battle of La Hogue. He presented the paintings to Ipswich town hall, as Hughes also came from that town.

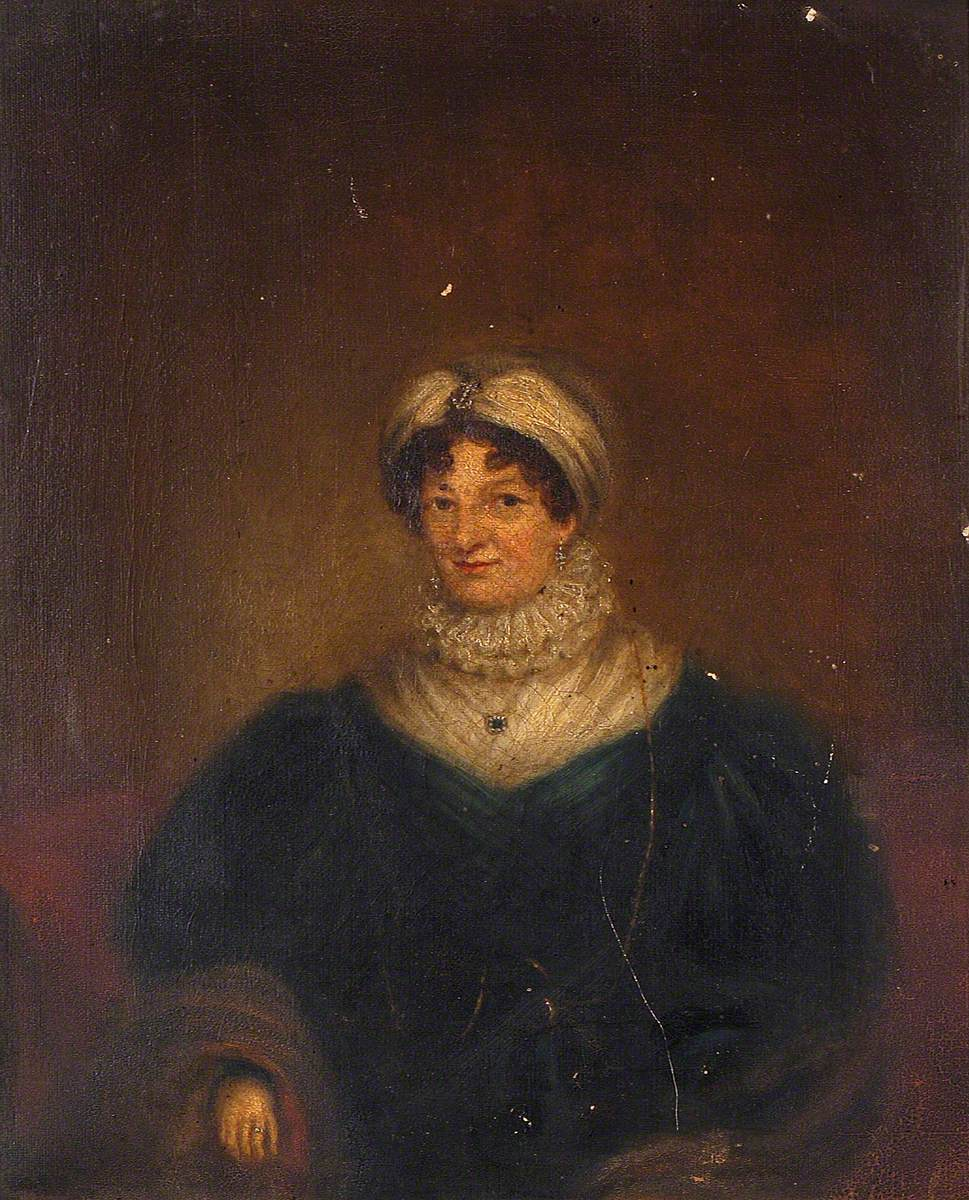
Page's wife Eliza

== Death ==
He died at Ipswich on 3 October 1845 at the age of eighty. He and his wife are remembered on a plain white marble tablet in St Mary-le-Tower Church.

== Family ==
Page married Elizabeth, the daughter of John Herbert of Totnes (who served for some time as Governor of Prince of Wales Island), on 2 August 1796. The couple remained childless and Elizabeth died in 1834. Having no children to inherit his property, Page distributed it among his nieces and nephews. His Ipswich mansion was left to the widow of his nephew Robert Leman Page. Other recipients included Admiral Sir George Cockburn, Archdeacon Henry Berners, and the widow of Rear-Admiral Sir Edward Berry.
