= Dukinfield (disambiguation) =

Dukinfield is a town in England.

Dukinfield may also refer to:

- Dukinfield (ward), an electoral ward of Tameside, England
- Dukinfield baronets, of Dukinfield, Cheshire

== People with the surname ==
- John Dukinfield (1677–1745), English merchant
- Robert Dukinfield (1619–1689), Parliamentarian commander during the English Civil War

== See also ==
- Dukinfield / Stalybridge (ward), an electoral ward of Tameside, England
