= Duckenfield Hall (1783 ship) =

History

Great Britain
- Name: Duckenfield Hall
- Namesake: A sugar estate at Duckenfield, Jamaica; see also John Dukinfield
- Owner: 1783:Nesbit; 1796:John St Barbe; 1799:Manning; 1819:Fry & Co.
- Builder: Thames
- Launched: 1783
- Fate: Wrecked September 1820
- Notes: Three decks

General characteristics
- Type: Brig
- Tons burthen: 359, 369, or 371, or 386, or 500 (bm)
- Propulsion: Sail
- Complement: 28
- Armament: 12 × 6-pounder guns

Duckenfield Hall was launched on the Thames in 1783. She spent most of her career trading with the West Indies. She made one voyage for the British East India Company (EIC) between 1797 and 1798. In 1819, she became a Greenland whaler. She was wrecked in the Orkney islands in 1820, while returning from a whaling voyage.

== Career ==
Duckenfield Hall enters Lloyd's Register in 1784, with W. Forster, master, Nesbit & Co., owner, and trade London–Jamaica.

In 1788, four men of Duckenfield Hall's crew mutinied and made off with her shallop. A Spanish schooner, while sailing from Havanah to Byam, on 20 July, came upon a vessel, believed to be the shallop, at Santa Cruz. The mainsail was stained with blood and there were three men aboard. The Spaniards seized the men and took them and the vessel to "Byam", where the men were put into jail on suspicion of their being the mutineers from Duckenfield Hall and of having killed one of their companions.

Duckenfield Hall is last listed in 1792, with C. Nockels, master, Nesbit, owner, and trade London–Jamaica. In 1792, Nesbit put a new vessel, Duckenfield (launched 1792; 516 tons (bm)), with Nockels, master, on the London–Jamaica route. It appears that Duckenfield Hall was simply laid up.

In 1794, her owners offered to charter Duckenfield Hall to the EIC. The broker offered her at £26/ton in war and £17 in peace, or at the average of the two lowest accepted rates for any River-built ships, for two voyages as an extra ship to Bengal or the Malabar Coast to carry cargoes of sugar, saltpeter, pepper, or other goods. The EIC rejected her on the grounds that she was too small for their purposes; they wanted a vessel of at least 400 tons (bm). The broker appealed, pointing out that she was 388 tons (registered), coppered, "In compleat order", and nearly ready for sea. That appeal appears to have fallen on deaf ears, and the broker wrote again, pointing out that she had carried as much as 650 tons.

Still, Duckenfield Hall re-entered Lloyd's Register in 1797, with J. Moring, master, J. St Barbe owner, and trade London–India.

EIC voyage (1797-1798): Captain James Moring acquired a letter of marque on 26 December 1796. Prior to taking command of Duckenfield Hall he had been captain of Crescent, which was also a St Barbe ship.

Captain Moring sailed from the Downs on 25 January 1797, bound for Madras and China. Duckenfield Hall was at Falmouth on 13 February, and arrived at Madras on 8 June. While she was in India, the EIC chartered her to serve as a transport, one of about fifteen, in a planned attack on Manila.

Duckenfield Hall arrived at Penang on 5 September, and waited there. However, the British Government cancelled the invasion following a peace treaty with Spain and the EIC released the vessels it had engaged. The EIC later paid £6401 19s 2d for her hire.

On 31 October, Duckenfield Hall was at Malacca and on 1 December, at Amboina. She reached Macao on 7 February 1798, and arrived at Whampoa Anchorage on 26 February. Homeward bound, she crossed the Second Bar on 26 March. She reached St Helena on 5 August, and arrived at Gravesend on 19 October.

Lloyd's Register for 1799 showed Duckenfield's master, owner, and trade changing, but the amendments are illegible. James Moring went on to command Comet, which also belonged to St Barbe. In 1800 Duckenfield Hall's master was W. Pedder, her owner Manning, and her trade London–Antigua.

On 24 February 1801, Lloyd's List reported that HMS Russell had towed "Duckingfield Hall", Pedder, master, into Torbay. She had been sailing from Antigua to London when off the Scilly Islands another vessel had run foul of her. Duckenfield Hall had lost her foremast, and her fore, main, and mizzen topmasts; the vessel that ran into her was believed to have foundered.

On 13 March 1812, Duckenfield Hall sailed from Falmouth with the West India Fleet. She left her anchor and cables behind, as did several other vessels, due to a strong gale that had come up.

Around 23 August 1816, Duckenfield Hall, Lusk, master, arrived in the Downs. She had sailed from Trinidad on 12 July.

The Register of Shipping for 1819, listed Duckenfield Hall with Turpin, master, Fry & Co. owner, and trade Hull–Davis Strait. She had become a Hull-based Greenland whaler. The Register for 1820, gave the name of her master as Maddison. In all, she made three whaling voyages.

Year	Master	Where	Whales	Tuns whale oil
1818	Turpin		7	108
1819	Maddison	Davis Strait	7	122 (320 butts)
1820	Maddison	Davis Strait	15	180 tons

On 11 August 1820, Duckenfield Hall was reported to be at Davis Strait and to have taken five fish (whales). By 30 July, she was still there and had taken nine fish.

== Fate ==
A report from Hull, dated 20 September 1820, stated that Duckenfield Hall had grounded in "The Orkneys" [sic] (archaic usage for the Orkney islands) on her way back from Davis Strait. The next issue of Lloyd's List, four days later, reported that Duckenfield Hall, Madison, master, from Davis Strait to Hull, had put into Orkney to discharge her cargo. Her back had been broken.

During the 1820 season, some 200 vessels participated in the northern whale fishery. Four were lost: Highflyer, of Hull, and Hope, of London, were lost at Greenland, Brothers, of Hull, was lost at Davis Straits, and Duckenfield Hall was lost in The Orkneys [sic]. The rest returned safely.
