= Crescent (1790 ship) =

History

Great Britain
- Name: Crescent
- Owner: 1790:John St Barbe; 1798:Shedden & Co.; 1801:Captain & Co.; 1802: Throckmorton & John Fisher; 1805:Mather & Co.
- Builder: Marmaduke Stalkart, Rotherhithe
- Launched: 15 May 1790
- Fate: Foundered 8 March 1807

General characteristics
- Tons burthen: 233, or 238, or 262 (bm)
- Complement: 1793:60; 1796:20; 1801:22
- Armament: 1793:6 × 12 + 8 × 6-pounder guns; 1796:10 ×6-pounder guns; 1801:16 × 9&4-pounder gun; 1806:10 × 12-pounder carronades
- Notes: Three decks

Crescent was launched at Rotherhithe in 1790. She initially traded with the Levant, particularly Smyrna. After the outbreak of war with France she may have tried her hand as a privateer. In 1796–1798 she made a voyage to the East Indies, almost surely on behalf of the British East India Company (EIC). A French privateer captured her but the British Royal Navy quickly recaptured her. In 1802-1804 she made one voyage as a slave ship in the triangular trade in enslaved people. In 1805 she became a whaler. She was lost in 1807 off Patagonia while homeward bound from her first whaling voyage.

== Career ==
Crescent enters Lloyd's Register in 1790 with J. Moring, master, St Barbe, owner, and trade London–Straits (of Gibraltar). subsequent volumes of Lloyd's Register refer to her trade as being London–Smyrna.

On 6 March 1793 Captain James Moring acquired a letter of marque. War with France had commenced in February and the size of Crescent's crew is consistent with her sailing as a privateer. In 1793 she had damages repaired.

Lloyd's Register for 1798 shows Crescent's master changing from J. Moring to J. Elsmere, and her trade from Falmouth–Smyrna to London–East Indies. (Note: Captain Moring took over command of the St Barbe ship Duckenfield Hall.) Captain John Ellesmere acquired a letter of marque on 9 June 1796.

Because the EIC had a monopoly on trade with the East, on her voyage to the East Indies Crescent was probably sailing on its behalf, or for the British government. Currently there is no readily available information to settle the question.

On 17 June 1798, the French 16-gun privateer Mercure captured Crescent as Crescent was returning to London from China. (Note: Mercure (1798) was probably the 200-ton ("of load"), 16-gun privateer from Saint-Malo commissioned around November 1797 under Captain Delastelle, with 97 men. She did another cruise later under Jacques Dupuy-Fromy from January 1799. HMS Melampus captured Mercure on 26 February.) However, on 29 June, the frigate HMS Caroline recaptured Crescent. Crescent was brought into Falmouth.

Lloyd's Register for 1798 shows Crescent's master changing from Lesmere to S. Brown, and her trade from London–East Indies to London–Jamaica. There also appears to have been a change in ownership, but the name of the new owner is illegible. The volume for 1799 makes it clear that the new owner was Shedden & Co.

=== Transporting enslaved people ===
On 11 June 1801, Captain William Chapman acquired a letter of marque. The Register of Shipping for 1802 shows her master changing from Chapman to A. Cowan, her owner from Capt. & Co. to Throckmorton, and her trade from London–Demerara to London–Africa. (Note: The owners were Throgmorton and Anderson.)

Captain Alexander Cowen sailed from London 13 September 1802. Because the Peace of Amiens had ended the war with France, Cowan did not acquire a letter of marque. In 1802, 155 vessels sailed from English ports, bound for the trade in enslaved people; 50 of these vessels sailed from London. (Note: The end of war with France in 1802, resulted in the Royal Navy discharging many experienced seamen. Wages for seamen engaged in Liverpool fell from £6 per month (plus clothing and food), to £1 16s per month.)

Crescent arrived at West Africa and started gathering captives at Cape Coast Castle on 8 December. She sailed from Africa on 29 May 1803, and arrived at Kingston, Jamaica, on 4 August. She landed 240 captives. (Note: Before Crescent left London, a government inspector had authorised her to carry up to 272 captives.) She sailed from Jamaica 18 November, and arrived at London on 29 January 1804.

=== Whaler ===
John Mather, Matthew Heathfield, Thomas Hopper, Thomas Mather, and Richard Heathfield purchased Crescent in 1805. She then underwent a thorough repair. The Register of Shipping for 1806 shows Hopper, master, Mather, owner, and trade London-South.

Crescent, Captain Thomas Hopper, sailed from England on 6 March 1805, bound for Peru. She was off the coast of Peru in July. 28 February 1806, she was "all well" off the Galápagos Islands. She was again "all well" of the coast of Peru in July. On 14 December she was around Cape Horn, bound for London.

== Fate ==
Crescent foundered off Patagonia on 8 March 1807. Edward, of Nantucket, rescued the crew. (Note: The rescuer was probably Edward, of Nantucket, Isiah Ray, master, which in 1805-1806 was whaling off Brazil.)
