= HMS Hobart =

Sloop of the Royal Navy

History

France
- Name: Cerf
- Namesake: The deer
- Builder: Bordeaux
- Commissioned: 1793
- Renamed: Revanche
- Captured: October 1794

Great Britain
- Name: HMS Hobart
- Launched: 1794
- Acquired: By capture on 21 October 1794
- Fate: Sold on 23 February 1803

General characteristics
- Class & type: 18-gun sloop
- Tons burthen: 340 bm
- Armament: 18 guns

HMS Hobart was an 18-gun sloop of the Royal Navy. She was formerly the French privateer Revanche, which Captain Edward Pakenham and Resistance captured in the Sunda Strait, East Indies, on 21 October 1794. The Navy sold her in 1803.

== French privateer ==
Cerf, later Revanche, was one of the 350-ton three-masted merchantmen from Bordeaux that could double as privateering corvettes when armed en course. She was commissioned in July 1793 in Île de France (now Mauritius). Her first cruise, under Claude Dubois, took place between July 1793 to February 1794. She was described as having a crew of 300 men and 30 guns. From May 1794 she was on a second cruise, still under Dubois, with 121 to 300 men, and 18, 28 or 30 guns.

== Royal Navy ==
Hobart served on the East Indies Station and on 1 October 1795 was under the command of Captain Benjamin William Page. She then carried a detachment of the 52nd Regiment of Foot, commanded by Captain Charles Monson, which took possession of Molletive, Ceylon.

In early 1796 Rear-admiral Peter Rainier led a squadron composed of HMS Suffolk, Centurion, Resistance, Orpheus, and Swift to attack Dutch possessions in the Banda or Nutmeg islands. One or two armed ships belonging to the British East India Company, and three transports carrying troops completed the expedition.

On 16 February the British arrived off Amboyna, the Dutch capital of the Molucca islands. The troops landed and took possession of the island. The treasury contained 81,112 rixdollars, and the warehouses contained 515,940 lbs. of cloves.

On 5 March the expedition arrived off Great-Banda, or Banda-Neira. The troops landed on the 8th after a little resistance from two small shore batteries. That evening Fort Nassau surrendered. The treasury at Banda-Neira held 66,675 rixdollars, and the warehouses held 84,777 lbs. of nutmeg, 19,587 lbs. of mace, and other stores. Each of the British naval captains about £15,000 sterling in prize money. Although Hobart had performed a valuable service prior to the captures, she did not share.

Rainier had had Captain Page and Hobart led the expedition through the straits of Malacca, Sincapore, and Banca because of Page's familiarity with the area. However, after the capture on 22 January in the straits of Banca of the brig Harlingen with important dispatches, Rainier had Hobart carry them to Madras. Because she was not at the capture, she did not share in the prize money. (Note: James refers to Harlingen as Haerlem.)

Page was formally appointed as Hobart's commander in April 1796. In December command of Hobart passed to Commander George Astle. Commander James Hills succeeded Astle in December 1797, and he was in turn succeeded by Commander Volant Vashon Ballard in July 1798. Commander Charles Elphinstone took over in August 1799, and commanded Hobart until being succeeded by Commander Francis Stratton in June 1800. In 1801 she was under Lieutenant Robert Evans, at first in an acting capacity, until his promotion to commander in April 1802.

== Fate ==
Having spent her entire naval career in the East Indies, Hobart was sold at Bombay on 23 February 1803.
