= George Astle =

British Naval Commander

Rear-Admiral of the Blue George Astle (27 November 1773 – c. 29 June 1830) was a British naval commander.

== Early life ==
Astle was the son of antiquary and paleographer Thomas Astle, and Anna Maria Astle, daughter of Philip Morant. He was born in Yoxall, Staffordshire, on 27 November 1773, and baptised in St Mary at Lambeth on 31 December 1773.

== Career ==
His career in the Royal Navy began in the early 1790s, and by 1794 he had been appointed lieutenant. In early January 1797, he returned from the Cape of Good Hope, in command of the newly captured HMS Prince Frederick. The Prins Frederik was a 68-gun Dutch Sailing Warship built in (1779), renamed Revolutie in 1796 and captured by the British in Saldanha Bay, off the coast of South Africa, on 17 August 1796. On his return to Britain, Astle took up command of HMS Hobart. HMS Hobart was an 18-gun sloop, that had been captured from the French in 1794. Astle passed over command of Hobart to Commander James Hills in December 1797. In August 1798, Astle was appointed captain and commander of the fifth-rate 38-gun frigate HMS La Virginie, a post he held until February 1803. Astle sailed to the ‘East Indies’, present-day Indonesia, and reported to The London Gazette the capture of a number of Dutch ships around Ambon, in February 1801. Later, Astle held the command of HMS Spartan, a new ship which was launched at Rochester on the Medway in August 1806. Astle held command until February 1807, when he was replaced by Jahleel Brenton. In May 1825, Astle was appointed Rear-Admiral of the Blue.

== Death ==
At the time of his death, in 1830, George Astle lived at Clapham Rise, in London. He was buried at St Mark's Church, Kennington in London on 29 June 1830.

== Family ==
George Astle was married to Ann (born, Marylebone, ca. 1784; died 3 May 1867, in Ramsgate). They had four children: George (1804-1876); Mary (1809-1887); John (born 1811); and Ann (1811-1892).
