= HMS Phosphorus (1804) =

Brig of the Royal Navy

History

Batavian Republic
- Name: Haasje
- Namesake: The hare
- Captured: 1803

United Kingdom
- Name: HMS Phosphorus
- Namesake: Phosphorus
- Acquired: 1804 by purchase of a prize
- Fate: Sold 1810

United Kingdom
- Name: Phosphorus
- Acquired: 1810 by purchase
- Fate: Lost c.1813

General characteristics
- Type: Brig
- Tons burthen: 11536/94, or 120, or 121 (bm)
- Length: 55 ft 7 3/8 in (17.0 m)
- Beam: 19 ft 9 in (6.0 m)
- Depth of hold: 12 ft 6 in (3.8 m)
- Propulsion: Sails
- Complement: At capture:33; Royal Navy:24; Mercantile:14
- Armament: Dutch service: 18 × 12-pounder carronades; At capture:6 cannon; Royal Navy:4 × 12-pounder carronades; Mercantile:8 × 6-pounder guns + 2 × 12-pounder carronades

HMS Phosphorus was the Dutch naval brig Haasje that the Royal Navy captured in 1803 and took into service in 1804 as a fireship. She took part in a notable single-ship action in 1806. The Navy sold her in 1810. She then became a merchantman trading with the Mediterranean. She was lost c.1813.

== Capture ==
Haasje was a Dutch naval brig that HMS Caroline captured on 2 August 1803 and sent into Saint Helena. She was 30 hours out of the Cape of Good Hope with dispatches for Batavia (Dutch East Indies) when she encountered the British. Captain-Lieutenant J. Ysbrands, her commander, initially refused to let Caroline's boats come alongside and it was only after Caroline had fired at Hassje that Haasje struck. By the time the British boarded Ysbrands had succeeded in throwing her dispatches overboard. She had been carrying eighteen 12-pounder carronades but had had to leave all but six at the Cape.

== Royal Navy service ==
In June 1804 the Royal Navy purchased Haasje and took her into service as the fireship HMS Phosphorus. She underwent fitting at Woolwich between 17 June and 11 September. Lieutenant John Heslop commissioned her in October, and Lieutenant William Tremlatt replaced him in January 1805. In August Lieutenant William J. Hughes assumed command. Lieutenant L.J. Reslop commanded Phosporus in 1805–1806. On 2 July 1806 Lieutenant William James Hughes assumed command.

At daybreak on 14 August 1806 Phosphorus was eight leagues south of the Isle of Wight on her way to join the Channel fleet. She encountered a French privateer lugger pierced for 16 guns, mounting 12 guns, and full of men. The two vessels exchanged fire, resulting in one of Phosphorus's carronades being out of action. The Frenchman ran alongside at ten minutes past five and 70–80 men attempted to board. Phosphorus's 24 officers and men repelled the attack; after 45 minutes the lugger made sail and sailed off. Hughes attempted to give chase but could not catch up and so went into the Downs. Hughes and seven of his crew were wounded, one severely and one mortally. Later reports gave the lugger's name as Elize.

His exploit earned Hughes the attention of the Duke of Kent and a letter of approbation from the Lords of the Admiralty. Lloyd's Patriotic Fund awarded him a sword worth £100, and also £100 in money. Lastly, he received promotion to the rank of Commander on 25 September 1806.

In 1807 Lieutenant R. D. Lancaster replaced Hughes.

Phosphorus, Royalist, and Bloodhound shared in the prize money for the Danish ship Æolus, which they took on 19 August 1807, early in the Gunboat War between Britain and Denmark.

Phosphorus shared with the hired armed cutter Active in the proceeds of the detention on 28 August of the Danish vessel Ferneijelsen.

=== Disposal ===
The "Principal Officers and Commissioners of His Majesty's Navy" offered Phosphorus, lying at Sheerness, for sale on 24 March 1810. She sold on that day.

== Merchantman ==
Phosphorus became a merchantman. She first appeared in Lloyd's Register (LR) and the Register of Shipping (RS) in the 1811 volumes. Although both sources agreed on master, owner, and trade, LR gave her origin as the Brazils, and RS gave her origins as "Dutch".

Captain Hugh Curtis acquired a letter of marque on 28 November 1811. She traded with the Mediterranean, sailing as far as Malta. She also was licensed to sail without convoy.

Year	Master	Owner	Trade	Source
1811	H.Curtis	F.Medley	London–Gibraltar	LR
1811	H.Curtis	T.Medley	London–Gibraltar	RS
1812	H.Curtis; T.Medley	F.Medley	London–Gibraltar	LR
1813	T.Medley	T.Medley	Hull–Gibraltar	RS

== Fate ==
RS for 1813 carried the notation "LOST" by her name. The executors of the will of Thomas Outibridge Medley, owner of Phosphorus, advertised on 30 March 1813, for all creditors and debtors to respond.
