= Thomas Buttersworth =

English seaman and painter

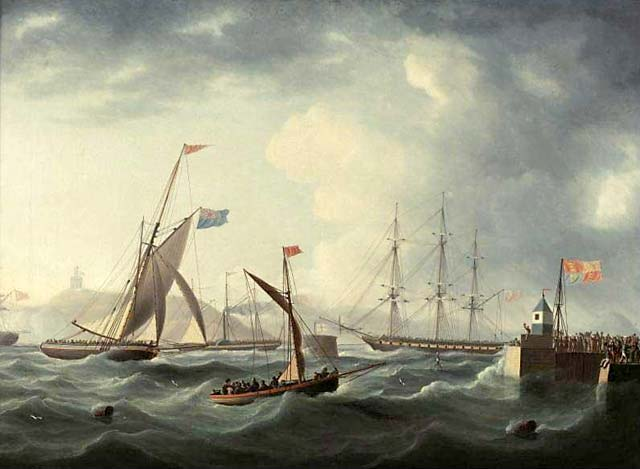
The Royal George at Leith for the Visit of King George IV to Scotland.

Thomas Buttersworth (5 May 1768 – November 1842) was an English seaman of the Napoleonic Wars period who became a marine painter. He produced works to commission, and was little exhibited during his lifetime.

== Life ==
Butterworth was born on the Isle of Wight. He enlisted in the Royal Navy in London in 1795, and served on HMS Caroline during the wars with France, before being invalided home from Menorca in 1800.

The National Maritime Museum in London has 27 watercolours by him, several of which are mounted on sheets from 18th century printed signal and muster books. He went on to paint numerous naval battle scenes and pictures such as the ‘'Inshore Squadron off Cádiz in 1797'’ which are thought to show scenes he witnessed. On being appointed Marine Painter to the East India Company he painted ship portraits on commission. It had been thought that he died in 1830, but recent research has found that he painted Queen Victoria's visit to Edinburgh in 1842 before he died in London later that year.

His son James Edward Buttersworth (1817–1894) also became a maritime painter.

== Gallery ==
British armed top sail schooner off Malaga, Spain, in the collection at The Mariners' Museum

British brig attacking a French lugger in the collection at The Mariners' Museum

the London off the Seven Sisters (1820) in the collection at The Mariners' Museum

battle between United States & Macedonian (ca. 1820) in the collection at The Mariners' Museum
