= Albion (1792 ship) =

History

Great Britain
- Name: Albion
- Namesake: Albion
- Owner: F. W. Hurry
- Builder: F. W. Hurry, Newcastle upon Tyne
- Launched: 1792

General characteristics
- Tons burthen: 430, or 43063/94, or 501 (bm)
- Length: Overall: 109 ft 4 in (33.3 m); Keel: 86 ft 9 1/2 in (26.5 m) (keel)
- Beam: 30 ft 6 1/2 in (9.3 m)
- Depth of hold: 12 ft 11 in (3.9 m)
- Propulsion: Sail
- Complement: 30; 45
- Armament: 14 × 6&4-pounder guns; 12 × 6-pounder + 2 × 4-pounder guns; 30 guns
- Notes: Three decks

Albion was an East Indiaman launched at Newcastle upon Tyne in 1792.

Albion made one voyage for the East India Company (EIC) as an "extra" (chartered) ship. The EIC had Perry measure and repair her in 1797. Captain John Parson (or Pearson) received a letter of marque 17 March 1797.

In 1782 the Albion was involved with several other letters-of-marque ships (Lord North, Hector, Friendship, John, Byron and Britannia) in the capture of a Spanish built ship the Three Brothers. The Three Brothers was legally condemned as prize at a court of the Vice Admiralty in Jamaica on 27 January 1783. She was then transferred to Liverpool for sale.

Parson sailed from the Downs on 24 May 1797, bound for Bengal. She arrived at Calcutta on 5 September 1797. Homeward-bound, she was at Culpee on 28 October 1797, (Note: Culpee (or Coulpy, Kulpi, Kalpi, or Kulpee), was an anchorage towards Calcutta, and just below Diamond Harbour and opposite Diamond Point.) and then at Saugor on 3 December 1797. She reached the Cape of Good Hope on 14 February 1798 and Saint Helena on 4 March 1798 before arriving at Blackwall on 19 June 1798.

In 1799 Albion was sent out to Calcutta to trade within the Far East.

An Albion, of 400 tons (bm), A. Wallace, master, was listed in 1803 as belonging to Madras. She was no longer listed in 1819.

Although one source states that she was destroyed by fire at Canton in December 1807, the vessel that burned was Albion.
