= John Dukinfield =

Bristol slave trader (1677–1745)

John Dukinfield (also Duckinfield, Duckenfield) was a Bristol merchant and slave trader. Born 12 August 1677 in Bristol, he died in 1745. He had two brothers, Robert and William. A member of the family holding the Dukinfield baronetcy, he was a member of the Society of Merchant Venturers.

== Trans-Atlantic slave trade ==
Dukinfield started in the Trans-Atlantic slave trade in 1713; his last voyage was in 1731. Dukinfield's slave ships made approximately 23 voyages for the purpose of buying and selling slaves, acquiring roughly 6,448 slaves in Africa, with 5,183 surviving. After purchase they were sent to be sold in various ports, mainly Jamaica, and Virginia, with less than 3% going to other Caribbean ports. 20% of slaves from his ships voyages did not survive, a comparatively high figure compared to the 12.1% average of the middle crossing death rate at the time. John Dukinfield purchased a total of 641 slaves in South Africa and around the Indian Ocean, of whom 443 slaves survived the journeys. He also received 336 slaves from the Gold Coast; 46 of these died during their voyage. Over all, 14% of his slaves appear to have died before reaching their destination. The majority of Duckfield's 23 voyages were to Jamaica, and the highest number ever was 715, in 1719. He co-owned many ships, including:The Little Bristol ,The Dukinfield, The Rebecca Snow, The Berkley, The Berkley Gally, The Abington, The Prince Eugene, The Tunbridge Gally, The Peterborough, The Joseph Anna, and The Betty.

== Illegal trading in Madagascar and piracy ==
In 1717 Dukinfield acquired a licence from the East India Trading Company to import Malagasy slaves from Madagascar to Jamaica. However, since his "cargo" consisted primarily of young children, and more than half died during the voyage, a small measure of prejudice followed his name. When Dukinfield made his next slaving trip to Madagascar, he did so without a temporary licence from the East India Company. As a result, when he arrived in Virginia, his ship was discovered to be trading illegally and so had its cargo seized; Dukinfield himself was sent back to England for trial. While trading, his ships would routinely run into trouble with pirates, which was commonplace during this period, and his ships were occasionally robbed, or even seized in their entirety. On one occasion a whole crew and captain were taken hostage.

== Other interests ==
When Dukinfield's ships returned from Africa, they would often carry with them foreign goods, including redwood, ivory, pepper, and exotic animal hides. He also was a big trader in sugar, due to the large sugar plantation he had established in Jamaica.

== Personal life ==
He married Ann Andrews, daughter of fellow Bristol merchant Captain William Andrews. Andrews had apprenticed Dukinfield in the latter's youth years. Duckenfield and Anne had 11 children, and he was survived by three daughters and his sons, William, Samuel (who became the 4th baronet) and Robert. The latter inherited the large plantation in St. Thomas-in-the-East in Jamaica, called Dukinfield Hall.
