= Nicolaas Sebastiaan Aalbers =

Dutch naval officer (1772–1806)

- Born: 21 October 1772; Terborg, Gelderland
- Died: 26 July 1806 (aged 33) Off Celebes, Java Sea
- Allegiance: Dutch Republic; Batavian Republic; Kingdom of Holland
- Branch: Dutch States Navy; Batavian Navy; Navy of the Kingdom of Holland
- Service years: 1780s–1806
- Rank: Captain-at-sea
- Commands: Zwaluw; Pallas
- Conflicts: French Revolutionary Wars; Napoleonic Wars; Java campaign of 1806–1807; Action of 26 July 1806

Captain-at-sea Nicolaas Sebastiaan Aalbers (21 October 1772 – 26 July 1806) was a Dutch naval officer who served in the French Revolutionary and Napoleonic Wars. As an officer in the Dutch States Navy, he served in the Dutch East Indies from 1789 to 1792 prior to the outbreak of the French Revolutionary Wars. Continuing to serve in the Batavian Navy, Aalbers returned to the East Indies in 1803 as part of a squadron under Vice-admiral Pieter Hartsinck. In late July 1806, he led a Dutch convoy which was defeated by the Royal Navy in the action of 26 July 1806, with Aalbers dying of wounds sustained during the battle.

== Early life ==
Nicolaas Sebastiaan Aalbers was born on 21 October 1772 in Terborg, Gelderland. His parents were Berend Aalbers and Barta Meijerink Aalbers. He joined the Dutch States Navy in the late 1780s and in spring 1789 captained the brig Zwaluw as part of a squadron under Captain-at-sea A. H. C. van Staringh which set sail for the Dutch East Indies, arriving there in December. Over the course of the next year, Aalbers participated in military operations against the Bone State and helped to prevent an anti-Dutch rebellion from breaking out in Surakarta. He continued to serve in the Spice Islands until 1792, when Aalbers returned to Holland with van Staringh's squadron; as Zwaluw was by now too weak to make the return voyage, Aalbers sailed on board the ship Merkuur instead. He continued to serve in the Dutch navy when it was transformed into the Batavian Navy in 1795.

== Napoleonic Wars and death ==
In 1803, Aalbers again returned to the Dutch East Indies as part of a squadron under Vice-admiral Pieter Hartsinck, captaining the 36-gun frigate Pallas. Promoted to captain at sea in 1804, he continued to serve in the East Indies when the Batavian navy was transformed into the navy of the Kingdom of Holland in mid-1806. In June of that year, Royal Navy forces under Rear-admiral Edward Pellew, having received information on Hartsinck's squadron and fearing that it could attack British trade routes in the region, began a campaign to destroy it.

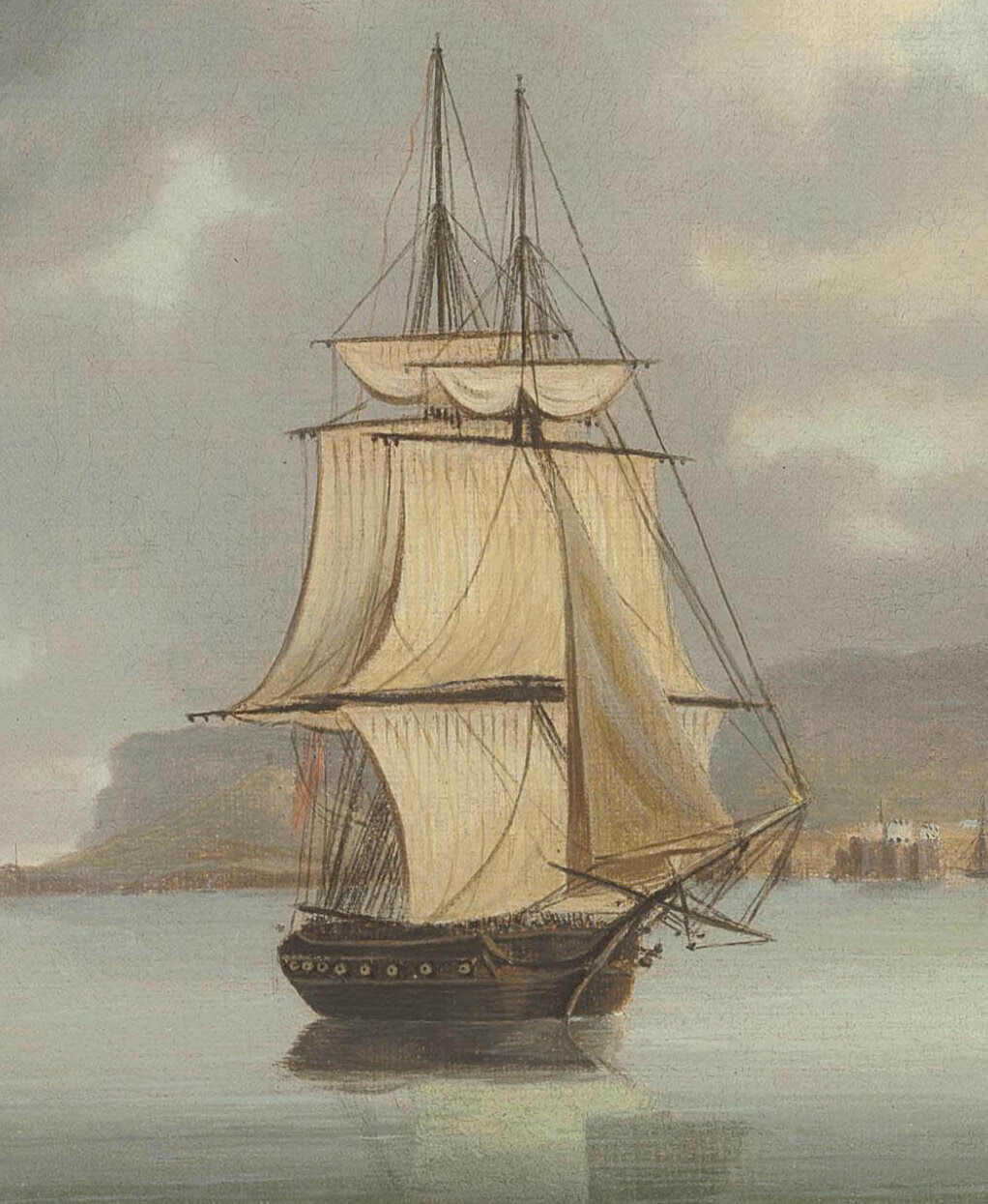
HMS Harrier off Funchal in 1805

In late July, Aalbers led a convoy from the Spice Islands which consisted of Pallas and the 24-gun corvette William under Captain-at-sea P. Feteris acting as escorts for two East Indiamen, Victoria and Batavier. On 25 July, the convoy was spotted passing the Selayar Strait by lookouts from two nearby British warships, the 32-gun frigate HMS Greyhound under Captain Edward Elphinstone and the 18-gun brig-sloop HMS Harrier under Commander Edward Troubridge. Elphinstone immediately started to chase the Dutch convoy, with Aalbers responding by forming a line of battle and retaining close formation as his ships passed the Dutch-controlled ports of Bonthain and Balacomba on the Celebes coast. At around 21:00, Aalbers ordered his convoy to anchor 7 nmi (8.1 mi; 13 km) offshore and prepare for the British attack. Elphinstone, fearing Victoria might be a ship of the line, halted his advance and Greyhound and Harrier stopped to observe the Dutch convoy during the night, maintaining a position 2 nmi (2.3 mi; 3.7 km) windward of Aalbers' ships.

At dawn, Greyhound's lookouts were able to ascertain that Victoria was a large merchantman rather than a warship and Elphinstone resumed the attack. Aalbers ordered his convoy to set sail shortly afterwards, his ships tacking away from the shore in line of battle ready for the British. However, in doing so Pallas drew ahead of the next ship in the line, creating a gap through which a British attack could be directed. At 05:00, Elphinstone raised French colours in an effort to confuse the Dutch and indicated that he wished to speak with Aalbers, who was not fooled; when Elphinstone opened fire on Pallas at close range at 05:30, the Dutch frigate immediately responded in kind. With the frigates engaged, Harrier cut between Pallas and Victoria, Troubridge ordering his ship's carronades to fire at Victoria and his men to fire muskets at Pallas's crew. Greyhound took advantage of the confusion Harrier's attack had created, passing Pallas's bow and raking her.

As Pallas's damage and casualties mounted, Harrier joined the attack; a wounded Aalbers passed control over the ship to one of his lieutenants. Gunfire from the Dutch frigate gradually slackened, and finally stopped at 06:10 when she struck her colours from the ship's mast with over 40 casualties from a crew of 250, 50 of whom were inexperienced native recruits. The British also captured Victoria and Batavier, with William escaping. All three captured ships were taken over by British prize crews and brought to Port Cornwallis on South Andaman Island. Eight members of Pallas's crew were killed and a further 32 were wounded, including Aalbers and three lieutenants. Six of the Dutch wounded later died of their injuries, including Aalbers. British losses by contrast were light, with one man killed and eight wounded on Greyhound and three wounded on Harrier. The Royal Navy subsequently took Pallas into service as HMS Makassar, and by the end of 1807 had all but destroyed Hartsinck's squadron.
