= Sydney (ship) =

Early 19th-century ship

History

United Kingdom
- Name: Sydney
- Owner: Campbell & Co.
- Builder: Java
- Fate: Wrecked 20 May 1806

General characteristics
- Type: East Indiaman
- Tons burthen: 900 (bm)
- Armament: 2 guns

Sydney was an East Indiaman of 900 tons that carried a crew of 130 men. The ship had been constructed in Java and was registered in Calcutta. Sydney, Austin Forrest, master, sailed from Port Jackson, Australia on 12 April 1806 for Calcutta, India. On 20 May 1806, she was wrecked off the coast of New Guinea, with no crew lost. Captain Forest arrived in Calcutta on 9 October 1806 on board Varuna from Penang, having sailed from there on 4 October. A letter from Captain Forrest put the locus of the wreck at 3°20′S 146°50′E. The locus of the wreck was later named Sydney Shoal.

Pallas was carrying Mr. Robson, the chief mate, and a party of lascars, reached Ambonya where the governor had treated them with great kindness and hospitality, and later put them on the Dutch frigate Pallas. HMS Greyhound and Harrier captured Pallas on 26 July.

Forest and the remainder of his crew reached Bencoolen on 19 July. They were able to board the East Indiaman Perseverance, which left Bencoolen on 17 August and arrived at Penang on 27 August on her way to China.

Sydney was uninsured. In 1825 Robert Campbell received some compensation from the Colonial government for the loss of Sydney as she had been sailing to bring back 400 tons of rice from Calcutta to alleviate the food shortage that floods on the Hawkesbury had caused. The compensation consisted of £2000 to be paid to Campbell's nominee in London, £1000 in sheep, and £1000s worth of land of his choice in New South Wales. The property was later known as Duntroon.
