= Charles Andrew Bruce =

Charles Andrew Bruce (1768–1810) was briefly Governor of Prince of Wales Island (now called Penang) from March 24, 1810, until his death in office in December 1810. He is buried at the Old Protestant Cemetery, George Town, Penang, now in present-day Malaysia.

Bruce was one of the sons of Charles Bruce, 5th Earl of Elgin and Martha Bruce, Countess of Elgin and Kincardine (1739–1810) and a brother of the collector Thomas Bruce, 7th Earl of Elgin.

The Prince of Wales Island Gazette Extra of 21 March 1810 recorded the appointment and arrival of Charles Andrew Bruce as Governor and the appointment of Colonel Norman Macalister and William Edward Phillips as members of Council.

== March 1810 ==
Occurrences for March 1810: March 24—Late on Tuesday night, the ship Bengal Anna, Captain Thomas Scott, anchored in the harbour from Calcutta, having on board the honourable C. A. Bruce as governor; honourable Mrs. Bruce, and two children; Mrs. Scott and three children; Major Yule, J. C. Lawrence, esq. civil service, captain M'Innes, 20th regiment, and lieutenant M'Donald, Bombay establishment. At sunrise, on Wednesday, the Anna saluted the fort, which was returned. At seven o'clock, the honourable Mr. Bruce landed under the appropriate honours, and was received at the wharf by the honourable the governor and members of council, who accompanied him through a street, formed by the military, to the government house. At ten o'clock, the honourable Mr. Bruce took the usual oaths and his seat as governor, and colonel Macalister was sworn in as second, and W. E. Phillips, Esq. third, and last member of council, under the customary salutes. The following proclamation was published by order of the honourable the governor and council. PROCLAMATION: Whereas the honourable the court of directors have been pleased to direct that a civil servant of the establishment of Bengal, should be appointed governor of this presidency, and the right honourable the governor-general in council, having under that authority, nominated the honourable Charles Andrew Bruce, to the office, the arrival of that gentleman, at this island, and his having taken the prescribed paths and charge of the government, is announced. All persons, in the honourable company's civil, military, and marine service, and all the other inhabitants of Prince of Wales's Island, and its dependencies, are therefore directed to take due notice thereof, and to obey the said honourable Charles Andrew Bruce, accordingly. The honourable the court of directors, having also appointed colonel Norman Macalister, to be second member of council, and commandant of the forces, and William Edward Phillips, Esq. third and last member of council, those gentlemen have this day taken the prescribed oaths, and their seats accordingly. Published by order of the honourable governor and council. THOS. RAFFLES, Sec. to Govt. Fort Cornwallis, March 21, 1810.

== December 1810 ==
PROCLAMATION, Fort Cornwallis, 28th Day of December (1810): In consequence of the much lamented death of the honourable Charles Andrew Bruce, late governor of Prince of Wales's Island and its dependencies, and commander in chief of the fort and town, and in the absence of Colonel Norman Macalister, second member of council, and next in succession to the office of government, vacant by this event, PUBLIC notice is hereby given, and it is proclaimed, the powers of governor of Prince of Wales's, and the command of the fort and town, has necessarily developed pro-tempore on William Edward Phillips, esq. third member of council; and that the same Wm Edward Phillips, esq. has this day duly taken the prescribed oaths and seat accordingly. It is also hereby further proclaimed, that John James Erskine, esq. has, in conformity to the provisional appointment of the honourable, the court of directors, been called in to the board, and has taken the prescribed oaths and his seat as a member of council. All persons in the civil, military and marine service, of the honourable East India Company, and all the other inhabitants of Prince of Wales's Island, and its dependencies, are therefore hereby required and directed to take due notice thereof, and to obey the said William Edward Phillips, esq. as governor and commander in chief accordingly pro-tempore. Published by command of the honourable the Governor in council. W. A. CLUBLEY, Act. Sec. to Govt.

== See also ==
- Governor of Penang
