= Henry Shepherd Pearson =

Henry Shepherd Pearson (c. 1775–1840) was acting Governor of Penang from 1807 to 1808.

According to "The Worthies of Westmorland" by George Atkinson, Pearson was the second son of Sir Richard Pearson and Hannah Shepherd. He was christened at Saint Mary the Virgin in Dover, Kent, on 8 February 1777. Another source holds that he was born in Dover on 20 October 1776, and that his mother was the former Margaret Harrison. In 1820, he married Caroline Lyons, daughter of John Lyons of Antigua and Catherine Walrond, and had the following children:

- Caroline Pearson (1827–1909), who married barrister and solicitor Charles Evan-Thomas of Glamorganshire, Cardiff, Wales
- Augusta Pearson (c. 1828–1922), who married barrister and solicitor George Arthur Knightley Howman (later Little)
- Emily Pearson (1830–1876), who married Captain Cowper Phipps Coles, R.N.
- Richard Lyons Otway Pearson (1831–1890)
- Henrietta Maria Pearson (1832–1890), who married Sterling Browne Westhorp
- Agnes Minna Pearson (1835–1908), who married the Rev. Richard Lister Venables in 1867 and had two daughters: Katherine Minna (1870–1956), who married Sir Charles Leyshon Dillwyn-Venables-Llewelyn, 2nd Bt., and Caroline Emily Venables (1872–1963)

When Pearson was writing his will (held in National Archives, PROB 11/1931, Image Reference 227/203) in July 1839, he noted that he was "formerly of Bombay" but currently was "of Liverpool House, Dover" (actually Walmer, Kent) and was residing in Boulogne-sur-Mer, Kingdom of France. He continued to live in Boulogne-sur-Mer and was there when he wrote a final codicil to his will on 14 January 1840, proved on 28 July that year. In his will, Pearson wrote that he wished to be buried where he died in the plainest manner possible. He died on 18 April 1840 in Boulogne-sur-Mer and is probably buried in the British section of the Eastern Cemetery there.

== April 1807 ==
On 4 April, Mr. W. C. Clubley was appointed deputy secretary:

Government Orders. Fort Cornwallis on 10 April. The whole of the troops at the presidency are to parade this afternoon, at half past four o'clock, in front of the Government-house, to attend the remains of the honourable Philip Dundas, late Governor of this island, to the place of interment. Lieutenant-colonel Basset to command. Three rounds of light cartridges per man to be served to the 20th regiment, which corps only is to fire over the grave, on account of the narrowness of the ground. Forty-five-minute guns, corresponding with the years of age of the deceased, are to be held in readiness to be fired during the funeral procession and to be commenced by a signal from the Government-house. The Bengal artillery furnished the carrying party. The garrison colours are to be hoisted at half mast at sun-rise and continue until sunset. (signed) John Drummond, Town Major. On 13 April, a salute of 19 guns to be fired, on H. S. Pearson Esq. taking his seat as governor of this island. Also a salute of 11 guns on W. E. Phillips, Esq. taking his seat as a member of the council. By order of the honourable governor and council. (signed) Thomas Raffles, Secretary to government.

== October 1807 ==
On 17 October:

Yesterday, the Hon. Colonel Norman Macalister in conformity with the orders of the hon. governor-general in council took the usual oaths and his seat as governor of this presidency. A salute of 19 guns was fired on the occasion. Henry Shepherd Pearson Esq. also took the oaths and his seat, as the second member of the council. Appointments. Captain M'Innes, to be private secretary to the governor, with the established salary of 120 Spanish dollars per month. Lieut. Robert Campbell, to act as aids-de-camp to the hon. the governor. Mr. Robert Ibbetson, to be assistant in the collector's office. Mr. Quintin Dick Thompson, to be paymaster, and commissary of provisions and petty stores. Mr. John Macalister, to be an assistant collector of customs and land revenues at Malacca. Mr. William Bennet, to be assistant to the warehouse-keeper. The office of deputy warehouse-keeper is to be abolished from the first of the ensuing month. Henry Shepherd Pearson, Esq. to be warehouse-keeper and paymaster. Mr. J. C. Lawrence is to be acting Malay translator to the government.
