= List of governors of Penang =

Governor of Penang
- Yang di-Pertua Negeri Pulau Pinang
- Standard of the Yang di-Pertua Negeri of Penang

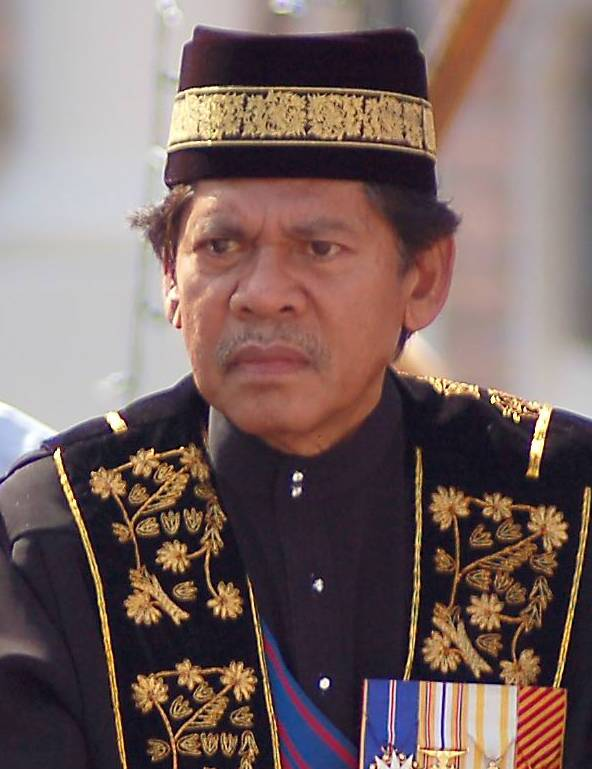
- Incumbent; Ramli Ngah Talib since 1 May 2025
- Style: Tuan Yang Terutama
- Residence: Seri Mutiara
- Appointer: Yang di-Pertuan Agong
- Inaugural holder: Raja Uda Raja Muhammad
- Formation: 31 August 1957; 69 years ago
- Website: www.penang.gov.my/index.php/tyt

The Governor of Penang, officially Yang di-Pertua Negeri of Penang (Malay: Yang di-Pertua Negeri Pulau Pinang), is the ceremonial head of state of the Malaysian state of Penang. The role of governor is largely ceremonial with the power vested in the executive branch of the state government led by the chief minister. The Yang di-Pertua Negeri is styled Tuan Yang Terutama (TYT; lit. 'His Excellency').

Until the 18th century, the island of Penang was part of the Sultanate of Kedah. In 1786, the island was ceded by the sultan of Kedah to the East India Company, with Francis Light representing the company. Light renamed the island Prince of Wales Island. In 1790, after suffering a military defeat at the hands of Light, Sultan Abdullah formally handed over the island to the British. Light was appointed Superintendent of Prince of Wales Island. From 1800 to 1805, the island was led by a lieutenant governor.

In 1805, Prince of Wales Island became a residency, led by a governor. In 1826, the island, along with Malacca and Singapore, were consolidated into the Straits Settlements. Thereafter, Penang was administered by a British resident councillor subordinate to the governor of the Straits Settlements.

Penang was occupied by the Japanese from 1941 to 1945. After the surrender of the Japanese, the British returned and briefly imposed military rule on Malaya before forming the Malayan Union in 1946. During the Malayan Union and the pre-independence Federation of Malaya period, Penang was administered by British resident commissioners.

Since independence, the head of state of Penang, the Yang di-Pertua Negeri (Governor) has been appointed by the Yang di-Pertuan Agong (King of Malaysia) after consultation with the chief minister of Penang. The governor retains only ceremonial functions, including opening and dissolving the state assembly, conferring state awards and appointing the chief minister after elections. The chief minister is the head of executive branch of the state government.

== Princes of Wales Island ==
=== Superintendents ===
Superintendent	Took office	Left office	Notes
Captain Francis Light	11 August 1786	21 November 1789	Superintendent
Captain John Glass	21 November 1789	9 February 1790	Acting Superintendent
Captain Francis Light	9 February 1790	21 October 1794	Superintendent, resumed. Died in office. "The inscription to his memory at St. George's Church by a contemporary Penang Resident – Robert Scott – adds to the favourable impression made by the public records a warm testimony to his worth:- "In Memory of Francis light Esq. who first established this Island as an English Settlement, and was many years Governor. "
Philip Manington	21 October 1794	30 November 1795	Acting Superintendent
Thomas Pigou	30 November 1795	31 January 1796	Acting Superintendent
John Beanland	31 January 1796	3 April 1796	Acting Superintendent
Major Forbes Ross MacDonald	3 April 1796	24 September 1797	Superintendent
George Caunter	24 September 1797	28 October 1798	Acting Superintendent, first period
Major Forbes Ross MacDonald	28 October 1798	December 1798	Superintendent, resumed
George Caunter	December 1798	20 April 1800	Acting Superintendent, second period

=== Lieutenant governors ===
Lieutenant Governor	Took office	Left office
Sir George Alexander William Leith	20 April 1800	1804
Sir Robert Townsend Farquhar	1804	1805

=== Governors ===
Name	Appointed	Ended	Notes
Philip Dundas	5 December 1804	8 April 1807	Died in office
Henry Shepherd Pearson	8 April 1807	2 March 1808	Acting
Norman Macalister	2 March 1808	March 1810	
Charles Andrew Bruce	24 March 1810	December 1810	Died in office.
William Edward Phillips	December 1810	1811	Acting.
Archibald Seton	1811	1812	
William Petrie	1811	1812	Acting while Seton in Java
William Petrie	29 January 1812	27 October 1816	Died in office
William Edward Phillips	27 October 1816	18 March 1817	Acting
John Alexander Bannerman	18 March 1817	8 August 1819	Died in office
William Edward Phillips	1 March 1820	August 1824	
Robert Fullerton	4 February 1824	12 November 1829	Governor of the Straits Settlements (1826–1830)

=== Resident councillors ===
Portrait	Name	Period in office
	William Clubley	1825–1826
	Robert Ibbetson	1826–1 May 1830

=== Residents and governors ===
Portrait	Name	Appointed	Left office
	Robert Fullerton (Resident)	1 May 1830	12 November 1830
	Robert Ibbetson (Initially Resident)	12 November 1830	7 December 1833
	Kenneth Murchison	7 December 1833	18 November 1836
	Sir Samuel George Bonham, Bt	18 November 1836	January 1843

=== Deputy residents and resident councillors ===
Name	Appointed	Left office	Notes
Robert Ibbetson	1 May 1830	12 November 1830	Deputy Resident
Kenneth Murchison	12 November 1830	7 December 1833	Initially Deputy Resident
James William Salmond	22 September 1834	1836	
Captain James Low	1838		Acting
Edmund Augustus Blundell	1849	1855	

In 1851 the Straits Settlements, while still remaining a residency, was transferred from the authority of the governor of the Presidency of Bengal and put under direct control of the governor-general of India. The powers previously invested in the governor of Bengal were now vested in the governor of the Straits Settlements.

- 1851–1855: Edmund Augustus Blundell was Resident Councillor of Prince of Wales Isle / Penang until 1855.
- 18XX–1860: William Thomas Lewis, Asst. Resident Councillor of Prince of Wales' Isle was transferred to Resident Councillor of Malacca in 1854 upon the demise of Captain Hay Ferrier. He would later become Penang's commissioner of police and its Resident Councillor. On 6 December 1838, he was appointed to officiate as resident councillor at Malacca during the absence on leave of Mr. Garling. W. T. Lewis retired as Resident Councillor of Penang in September 1860. He had transferred to the Straits Settlements in 1825 and had served the Government of the Straits Settlements for about 54 years. He was Siamese Consul at Penang during Ord's Governorship. In 1856 he was Resident Councillor and Acting Governor of Penang.
- 1860–1867: Major General Henry Stuart Man was Resident Councillor of Penang. Major General Henry Man was born in 1815 and became known in 1834 as an ensign in the 49th Madras Native Infantry. He was the captain in 1848, serving in the second Anglo-Burmese was 1852–1853 later becoming executive engineer and superintendent of convicts at Mulmein, Burma. In 1858, he was the officer-in-charge of the detachment that secured the British landing at Port Blair and formally annexed the islands to the British Crown. In 1860, Lieutenant-Colonel Man, as then was he, was appointed Resident Councillor of Penang and served in that capacity until 1867. In 1868, Lieutenant-Colonel Henry Man returned to Port Blair as its fifth Superintendent while at the same time taking over the responsibility for the newly annexed Nicobar islands. The following year, his son, E.H. Man, joined him at Port Blair and the old Man relinquished his official position and was promoted to colonel. He was promoted to major-general in 1881. He died at Surbiton, England, on 10 April 1898 was buried at Thames Ditton, Surrey.

== Colonial Office, United Kingdom ==
=== Lieutenant-governors, Penang ===
On 1 April 1867 the Straits Settlements were transferred from the control of the Indian government to that of the secretary of state for the colonies in London (Colonial Office).

- 1867–1871: Major General Archibald Edward Harbord Anson, Lieutenant-Governor of Penang under Governor-General Sir Harry St. George Ord at Singapore.
- 1871–1872: Arthur Nonus Birch, Actg. Lieutenant-Governor of Penang, Malaysia (1871–1872)
- 1872–1873: Sir George William Robert Campbell, KCMG, Acting Lieutenant-Governor of Penang
- 1873–1875: Major General Archibald Edward Harbord Anson, Lieutenant-Governor of Penang under Governor General Sir Andrew Clarke at Singapore.
- 1875–1877: Major General Archibald Edward Harbord Anson, Lieutenant-Governor of Penang under Governor-General Sir William Jervois at Singapore.
- 1877: Major General Archibald Edward Harbord Anson, Acting Governor of the Crown Colony of the Straits Settlements at Penang
- 1877–1879: Major General Archibald Edward Harbord Anson, Lieutenant-Governor of Penang under Sir William Cleaver Francis Robinson at Singapore.
- 1879–1880: Major General Archibald Edward Harbord Anson was Acting Governor of the Crown Colony of the Straits Settlements at Penang.
- 1879–1880: Charles John Irving, Actg. Lieutenant-Governor of Penang (1879–1880)& Resident Councillor of Penang (1885–1887). He was Auditor General to the government of Penang under Anson. He was born in 1831 at Isabelle place in Camberwell, London. He been took up some appointments at Mauritius.
- 1880–1881: Major General Archibald Edward Harbord Anson, Lieutenant-Governor of Penang under Sir Frederick Weld at Singapore. Born 16 April 1826. His military experience began in 1844. He served in England, Ireland and Scotland from 1847 to 1855, Mauritius, 1857–1862 and Madagascar 1862–1865. He then returned to England and was appointed last Lieutenant Governor of Penang from 1867 to 1882, after serving in the army in India. In his memoirs "About Others and Myself." he describes the feeling of depression upon his appointment as Penang's Resident Councillor. He retired in 1881. It was during his appointment that the Penang Riots occurred. The riots ended when he negotiated a peace agreement between the contending parties; Red Flag and Tua Pek Kong members against the White Flag and the Ghee Hin. He was an Acting Governor of Straits Settlements from (4 March 1871 – 22 March 1872; 3–4 November 1873; 3 April 1877 – 29 October 1877; 10 February 1879 – 6 May 1880). Anson died in 1925.
- 1881–1884: Major John Frederick Adolphus McNair (1828-1910), Actg. Lieutenant-Governor of Penang (1881–1884)& Resident Councillor of Penang (1884)only. Entered Madras Royal Artillery in 1845. In 1857, A.D.C. to Governor Blundell in Singapore. From 1865 to 1867 he was in England as deputy governor in charge of public works at Woking Prison. He retired in 1884.
- 1884: Captain David Thompson Hatchell (b.1840), Acting Lieutenant-Governor of Penang. He became commissioner of the court request in Ayer Itam, Penang in 1876.

=== Resident Councillors, Penang ===
- 1884–1885: Major Samuel Dunlop, Actg. Resident Councillor of Penang. D.G.M of Freemasons' Hall in 1885, Singapore.
- 1885–1887: Charles John Irving, Resident Councillor of Penang. He was born in 1831 at Isabelle place in Camberwell, London. He been took up some appointments at Mauritius.
- 1887–1897: Allan Maclean Skinner, Resident Councillor of Penang. Inspector General of Schools, Hospitals and Prisons under Anson. 1881 – Colonial treasurer and Auditor-General, Skinner was the first Resident Councillor who took residence at the official residence called Residency (now Seri Mutiara) in 1890. He was the President of George Town Municipal Council.
- 1887–1889: Sir William Edward Maxwell, Actg. Resident Councillor of Penang. Actg. He was Lieutenant-Governor of Malacca in 1870.
- 1891–1895: Henry Trotter, Actg. Resident Councillor of Penang (24 October 1891 – 31 October 1892; 16 September 1894 – 7 December 1895). Born 1837 in Cape Colony, South Africa. Became a private secretary to the Governor of Dominica in 1852.In 1859, he received a clerkship in the office of Commander-in-chief (Duke of Cambridge) at the House Guards. Appointed as Deputy Comptroller of the Convict Establishment in Bermuda. Transferred to Ceylon as Inspector of Post Offices and later became Postmaster General. In 1871, appointed as Postmaster General of Straits Settlements. He became Auditor-General Of Straits Settlements in 1882.
- 1894–1895: Francis James Anderson, Actg. Resident Councillor of Penang
- 1897–1903: Charles Walter Sneyd-Kynnersley, Resident Councillor of Penang (5 May – 23 December 1897 / 8 April 1900 – 24 February 1901 – 1903). Acting Resident Councillor of Penang from (25 April 1889 – 9 March 1890; 4 February – 23 March 1897). Acting Resident Councillor of Malacca from (7 December 1893 – 1 January 1895; 31 December 1898 – 10 March 1899).Resident Councillor of Malacca from (1 January – 16 April 1895; 6 February 1896 – 4 February 1897). He was born on 25 September 1849. His first appointment was as a Cadet in April 1872 by the Secretary of State and was sent to the Colony the very next month. In October 1873, he passed Final Examination in Malay and was attached to the Lieutenant-Governor's Office, Penang, as Secretary Assistant. In 1875, he worked as the Assistant Magistrate and Commissioner Court of Request in Province Wellesley. He also served as the Secretary for Committee of Management of Penang Free School. He served as Third Magistrate in Singapore in 1880 and as Second Magistrate, the following year, before returning to Penang in the same year as First Magistrate. From 1890 to 1896, he held various posts including First Magistrate, Singapore. He married Ada Maud Nash in 1884 and was invested with CMG in 1899. He died on 11 July 1904.
- 1905–1906: James Kortright Birch, Actg. Resident Councillor of Penang from (3 March 1897 – Aug. 1898; April 1901 – November 1902 – ?; 1903–1905) & Resident Councillor of Penang from (1905–1906). He was born on 12 August 1850. In 1872, he was appointed by the Secretary of State and was sent to the Colony to be attached to the Colonial Secretary's office. He passed Final Examination in Malay in 1873. In 1874, he was the Acting Deputy Collector of Land Revenue, Penang and the Magistrate and Coroner for the Settlement. In 1875, he was the Collector of Land Revenue, Penang. After home leave in 1876–77, he appointment as Acting Magistrate took him to work in Malacca and Singapore until 1882 when he returned to Penang to work as Acting Superintendent of Education in Province Wellesley. In 1888, he was appointed as Senior District Officer, Province Wellesley before becoming First Magistrate of Penang in 1890.
- 1907–1908: Robert Norman Bland, Resident Councillor of Penang from 17 February 1907 – 14 March 1908 and 7 May 1908 – 1910). Acting Resident Councillor in Malacca (22 April – 10 September 1900 and 26 November 1901 – 13 June 1903 and 15 October 1903 – 1 January 1905). Resident Councillor of Malacca (1 January 1905 – 13 March 1906). Acting Resident Councillor of Penang (22 November 1906 – 17 February 1907). Born on 10 October 1859. Arrived in the Colony February 1883 and was attached to the Colonial Secretary's Office as Cadet learning Chinese. In April of the same year, he was posted to Land Office, Malacca as a Cadet learning Malay and passed Final Examination in Malay in 1884. After a home leave in 1886, he was appointed Assistant to Resident Councillor, Penang before becoming District Officer of Balik Pulau in 1887 and District Officer, Nibong Tebal in the following year. He was Acting First Magistrate Penang before taking his second home in 1889. His next appointment after his home leave took him away from Penang to serve as Collector of Land Revenue, Singapore in 1890. Appointed Acting Officer in Charge, Negeri Sembilan from 1893 to 1895. He was transferred to Singapore in 1896 to resume his duties as Collector of Land Revenue before returning to Penang in 1897 to work as Inspector of Prison, Straits Settlement as well as Senior District Officer, Province Wellesley. He became Acting Resident Councillor of Malacca (22 April – 10 September 1900). He became Resident Councillor of Malacca from (26 November 1901)
- 1910–1911: James Oliver Anthonisz, Actg. Resident Councillor of Penang (29 April 1910 – 18 January 1911).
- 1911–1912: William Evans, Resident Councillor of Penang from (21 January 1911 – 11 May 1912 and 29 January 1913 – 13 February 1914). Acting Resident Councillor in Malacca from (15 March 1906 – 17 February 1907). Resident Councillor of Malacca (17 February – 4 September 1907; 25 February – 14 March 1908; 8–29 May 1908; 3 July 1908 – 15 February 1909; 29 May 1909 – 8 February 1910). Acting Resident Councillor of Penang (14 March – 8 May 1908). William Evans was born on 5 September 1860. He first came to the Colony in 1882 and was attached to the Chinese Protectorate Service, Singapore. In 1884, he was sent to Amoy to study Chinese (Hok-kien) and passed its Final Examination in 1885. He also passed Final Examination in Malay in 1888. From 1887 onwards, he continued to serve in Penang and Singapore as the Protector of Chinese in the Straits Settlement until 1902 while holding other post such as Municipal Commissioner for Singapore in 1896.
- 1914–1917: Alfred Thomas Bryant, Resident Councillor of Penang. Born on 4 October 1860. First came to Colony in 1883 and was attached to the Colonial Secretary's Office for two years. After passing his Final Examination in Malay in 1885, he was appointed Acting Third Magistrate, Penang in 1886 and as Acting Collector of Land Revenue, Penang a few months later. In 1890, he was promoted to District Officer of Dindings. After his home leave, he passed Final Examination in Tamil in 1892 and was transferred to Malacca as Acting Collector of Land Revenue and Officer in Charge of Treasury. In 1895, he was in Penang again as Acting First Magistrate, a position he held until he became First Magistrate in 1898, while becoming the Inspector of Schools, Straits Settlements since 1897.
- 1917–1919: Walter Cecil Michell, Resident Councillor of Penang. Acting Resident Councillor of Penang from (18 May 1912 – 29 January 1913) and Acting Resident of Malacca from (11 June 1914 – 24 December 1915). Born in Kensington, London on 9 August 1864. First came to the Colony in 1887 and was attached to the Colonial Secretary's Office until 1888 when he was posted to Sungai Ujong, Negeri Sembilan as Acting Collector of Land Revenue. He passed his Malay Examination in 1889. From 1889 until 1890, he was in Ulu Pahang as Acting Superintendent before arriving in Penang in April 1890 to serve as Acting District Officer, Balik Pulau, but soon to be promoted as District Officer of the district in 1891. In 1895, after home leave, he was transferred to Dindings as Acting District Officer but soon afterwards as its District Officer while holding other duties as Deputy Registrar, Supreme Court, Penang. He was in Singapore from 1897 to 1898 as Acting Second Assistant Colonial Secretary and as Acting Collector of Land revenue. He also passed Final Examination in Siamese in 1898, the year he was Acting Senior District Officer, Province Wellesley. In 1890, he was appointed Second Magistrate, Singapore and Official Assignee in 1901 before becoming Acting Commissioner, Court of Request Singapore in 1902. W.C. Michell loved polo, riding, shooting and member of various clubs in Penang.
- 1919–1922: Gilbert Amos Hall, Resident Councillor of Penang. Acting Resident Councillor of Penang from (24 July – 20 October 1919). Born on 21 July 1867. He went to work for the Straits Settlements Civil Service, Singapore in 1888. In 1891, he passed Final Examination in Malay and was promoted to the Acting Third Magistrate, Penang the same year. In 1894, he was appointed as Acting District Officer, Dindings. A few months later, he passed Final Examination in Hok-kien and was appointed Superintendent of Education, Penang. He worked as Acting District Officer, Alor Gajah, Malacca, after returning from home leave in June 1895 until November 1896. In 1897, he was back in Penang to serve as Acting Second Magistrate and later as Sheriff and Deputy Registrar of the Supreme Court, Singapore, while continued to act as Second Magistrate, Penang. In 1898, he served two positions as Second Assistant Colonial Secretary and Collector of Land Revenue, Penang. He was transferred to Malacca at the end of 1900 after his home leave as Acting Collector of Land Revenue and Officer in Charge of Treasury. In 1902, he worked as Collector of Land Revenue, Malacca. He was the British Adviser of Kedah (1916–1919). He lived in Hampshire after his retirement in 1922.
- 1920: Harold William Firmstone, Acting Resident Councillor of Malacca, Malaysia (4 September 1907 – 6 September 1907; 14 March 1908 – 8 May 1908; 29 May 1908 – 3 July 1908). Acting Resident Councillor of Penang.
- 1922–1925: Arthur Blennerhassett Voules, Resident Councillor of Penang. Acting Resident Councillor of Penang 17 November 1922 – 9 December 1922. Born London 15 September 1870. Joined Perak government Service in 1892. Acting Federal Inspector of Schools at Kuala Lumpur in 1900. Captain of the Royal Selangor Golf Club in 1905. Solicitor-General, Straits Settlements in 1913. Acting Attorney General of Straits Settlements in 1919. Acting Judicial Commissioner of Federated Malay States in 1919. Acting Legal Adviser of Federated Malay States and legal advisor (Officer, Class 1A), both in 1920. President of Selangor Golf Club in 1920. He retired in 1925. He died in 1954. Compiled a book called The Laws of the Federated Malay States, 1877–1920.
- 1924: Stewart Codrington, Acting Resident Councillor of Penang. Codrington Avenue is named after him.
- 1925–1926: William Peel, Resident Councillor of Penang. Born in Hexham, Northumberland on 27 February 1875. Joined the Colonial Service in 1897 as Cadet. Promoted to Acting District Officer of Nibong Tebal in 1898 and Bukit Mertajam in 1899 and Province Wellesley until 1901. Acting Second Colonial Secretary, Singapore in 1902. Returned to Penang in 1905 to serve as Acting Second Magistrate and Coroner. After serving as Acting Auditor in 1908 in Penang, he continued his service at various capacities in the Federated Malay States such as Acting Secretary to the Resident of Selangor in 1909 and Acting District Officer Lower Perak in 1910 before returning to Penang as President of the Municipal Commissioners Penang in 1911. Acting Resident Councillor of Penang from (26 February – 5 October 1917). Later he became president of the municipal commissioners of Singapore in 1918. In 1919 he was appointed as joint passage controller of labour for the Federated Malay States and Straits Settlements in 1920; and chairman of European Unemployment Committee in 1921. In 1922 he became British Adviser for Government of Kedah. He became Acting Resident Councillor of Penang from (10 May – 9 July 1925). In 1927, he acted as officer administering the government and High Commissioner for the Malay States, having been promoted to be Chief Secretary to Government in 1926.He was appointed Governor of Hong Kong in 1930. He retired in 1935. Peel Avenue is named after him.
- 1926–1928: Ralph Scott, Resident Councillor of Penang. Born 26 February 1874. First appointed as Cadet by the Secretary of State in 1895. In 1896, attached to the Colonial Secretary's Office. From 1897 until 1912, served various appointments in the Straits Settlements: Land Office in Malacca, Acting Deputy Registrar at Penang Supreme Court and Acting Collector of Land Revenue, Singapore. In 1912, promoted to Acting District Judge, Singapore and as Acting District Judge and First Magistrate of Penang in 1915. Acting Resident of Malacca (14 February 1909 – 25 July 1910) / Actg. Resident of Malacca from (15 March 1920 – 6 January 1921) /Actg. Resident Councillor of Penang from (10 September – 17 November 1922) /Actg. Resident Councillor of Penang from (May 1926) /Resident Councillor of Malacca from (14 April 1925 – May 1926). Scott Road was named after him.
- 1928–1930: Captain Meadows Frost, Resident Councillor of Penang. Resident Councillor of Malacca (9 June 1926 – 25 March 1927). Acting Resident Councillor of Penang (8 April 1928 – 8 July 1928). Born on 18 April 1875. First joined the Colonial Service in 1898 as a cadet and promoted to Assistant District Officer of Kuala Pilah, Negeri Sembilan in 1901 and Acting District Officer of Kuala Lipis, Pahang in 1902. Moved to Pekan, Pahang in 1904 also to serve as Assistant District Officer. In 1905, promoted to District Treasurer of Seremban, Negeri Sembilan. His next appointment took him to the Northern part of the Malay Peninsula where he was to act as British Consul to the Siamese Southern States in 1905 and as Acting British Adviser to His Royal Highness Raja of Perlis from 1909 to 1911. Acting British Adviser of Kedah in 1911. Acting Superintendent, Convict Establishment. He married Catherine Fulton Carver in 1911 and died on 28 August 1954.
- 1930–1931: Edward Wilmot Francis Gilman, Resident Councillor of Penang. Acting Resident Councillor of Penang (17 January – 17 April 1930). Born on 16 August 1876 in Shanghai, China. Appointed as a Cadet in the Straits Settlements in 1899. Acting Fourth Magistrate of Singapore in 1901. In 1902, passed examination in Tamil and was transferred to Penang as Acting Assistant of Indian Immigration. In 1910, served as Acting District Officer of Kuala Lipis, Pahang for a year before reassigned as Deputy Superintendent of Immigrants Straits Settlements and Federated Malay States in 1911. Secretary Indian immigration Committee in 1912 and Deputy Controller of Labour in same year. Federal Examiner in Tamil in 1913 and served as Immigration Officer in Madras for the Straits Settlements and Federated Malay States. In 1915, he was the Officiating Deputy Controller of Labour, Penang, and Assistant Censor in 1916. He married Bessie Violet Bagot in 1904 and was invested with CBE in 1929. Retired on 15 August 1931 and died on 13 March 1955.
- 1931–1933: Percy Tothill Allen was Resident Councillor of Penang. Acting Resident Councillor of Penang from (2 May 1931 – 16 August 1931). Born 14 October 1878. Appointed as a Cadet by the Secretary of State in 1902 and was later promoted to acting Second Assistant in the Chinese Protectorate at Penang in 1905. Served as District Officer of Matang, Perak in 1906. Acting District Officer of Christmas Island, Australia in 1907 then District Officer until 1909. In 1909, returned to Penang to hold the Acting Assistant Protector of Chinese and Superintendent of Prisons. Served a few months as Acting Second Assistant for District Officer in Tapah, Perak in 1909 before being appointed Secretary to the Resident of Negeri Sembilan in the same year. Acting Magistrate of Seremban, Negeri Sembilan until 1912. Returned to Penang to hold post of Acting Assistant, Protector of Chinese in 1913 and in Singapore in 1917.
- 1933–1941: Arthur Mitchell Goodman was Resident Councillor of Penang. Born 15 December 1886. Joined the Malayan Civil Service in 1909 as a Cadet. Acting Assistant Protector of Chinese, Perak in 1912. Assistant Controller of Labour, Perak in 1915. Acting Magistrate in Ipoh in 1916. Acting Assistant Protector of Chinese, Penang in 1917. Acting Secretary for Chinese Affairs of the Federated Malay States 1921. Secretary Chinese Affairs SS 1927. Member Penang Harbour Board. Member Executive and Legislative Councils SS. Acting Resident Councillor of Penang (21 April 1933 – 14 October 1933). Resident Councillor of Penang (14 October 1933 – 24 November 1934). On leave from (24 November 1934 – 29 August 1935). Resumed duty from (29 August 1935 – 8 December 1937). Resumed duty on 6 July 1938.
- 1934: James Startin Wills Arthur was Acting Resident Councillor for Penang. Born in Powick, Worcester 9 March 1881. District Officer of Christmas Island, Australia (1911–1912), Assistant Adviser Kedah 1916–1921, Deputy President Municipal Commissioners Penang 1923, District Judge Malacca 1924, MCS Assistant Treasurer in Penang. Director-General of Posts and Telegraphs, Malaya 1934. Acting Resident Councillor for Malacca (20 February 1934) and Penang (24 November 1934). Retired 29 August 1935.
- 1937–1938: George Alexander de Chazal de Moubray, Actg. Resident Councillor of Penang. Born 1888. Director of Land Office of Terengganu (1926–1929). DO Kinta and Member of Perak State Council 1934. Acting British Adviser, Kelantan 1938. British Adviser of Terengganu (1940–1941). Police Magistrate, Straits Settlements. He was taken as prisoner of war in Changi, Singapore during Japanese Occupation. Changi and Sime Rd internee.
- 1940–1941: Leslie Forbes (born 1889) was Acting Resident Councillor of Penang. He was an internee at Changi and Sime Rd. He was a member of the British Military Administration until 1973.

== Japanese occupation ==
- 1942–1943: Lt-Gen. Shotaro Katayama
- 1943–1944: Maj-Gen. Masakich i Itami
- 1944: Lt-Gen. Shinohara Seiichiro
- 1944: S. Ikagawa
- 1944–1945: Lt-Gen. Shinohara Seiichiro

== British military administration ==
- 1945: Peter Dicken Cracroft (1907–2003) assumed command as Military Governor of Penang on 24 September 1945 under Lord Louis Mountbatten.
- 1945–1946: Thomas John Norman Hilken (1901–1969)

== Malayan Union and Federation of Malaya ==
=== Resident commissioners of the Settlement of Penang ===
- 1946–1948: Sydney Noel King (b. 6 June 1897) was Resident Commissioner of Penang from 1946 to 1948. He was born on 6 June 1897. He was a Cadet in the Straits Settlements in March 1920. He was attached to Land Office, Penang in May 1920. He served as Acting District officer in Bukit Mertajam in 1923. In March 1932 he worked as Acting First Magistrate, Johor Bahru, before being appointed Deputy Public Prosecutor, Johor, in the same year. He was District Officer of Christmas Island, Australia from 1925 to 1926. He was appointed Acting Under Secretary of the Straits Settlements in April 1936 and as Acting Legal Adviser of Kedah in June 1937. He was an internee at Changi and Sime Rd. He was a member of the British Military Administration until 1973.
- 1948–1951: Arthur Vincent Aston (b. 1896) was a Resident Commissioner of Penang. He was an internee at Changi and Sime Rd.
- 1948: George Evan Cameron Wisdom was Acting Resident Commissioner of Penang. He was Resident Commissioner of Malacca from 1951 to 1954.
- 1951–1957: Robert Porter Bingham was Resident Commissioner of Penang. He was an Acting Resident Commissioner of Penang in 1950.
- 1952: Norman Ward was acting Resident Commissioner of Penang.
- 1954: John Sjovald Hoseason Cunyngham-Brown (1905-1989) was Acting Resident Commissioner of Penang from 25 June – 17 July 1954. He retired in 1957 and died, in Georgetown, Penang, in 1989.
- 1954–1955: David Gray (born 1906), Acting Resident Commissioner of Penang, from 30 December 1954 to 3 August 1955. He had been Assistant Protector of Chinese, Singapore Police Magistrate, Chinese Secretariat in 1934. He was an internee at Changi and Sime Rd internee. Upon returning to Malaya in 1947, he was assigned to the Dept of Labour, Federation of Malaya. He was appointed to Secretary of Chinese Affairs, Federation of Malaya in 1951. In 1952 he was appointed Acting Chief Secretary of the Federation of Malaya. He was Acting Resident Commissioner, Penang, from 1954 to 1955. He then moved on to become Acting Chief Secretary for the Federation of Malaya and Officer Administering the Government of the Federation of Malaya from 1955 to 1956.

== Independent Federation of Malaya and Malaysia ==
No.	Portrait	Governor	Term of office		
No.	Portrait	Governor	Took office	Left office	Time in office
1		Tun Dato' Seri Utama Sir; Raja Uda Raja Muhammad (1894–1976)	31 August 1957	30 August 1967	10 years, 0 days
2		Tun Dato' Seri Utama; Syed Sheh Shahabudin (1912–1969)	31 August 1967	31 January 1969	1 year, 154 days
3		Tun Dato' Seri Utama; Syed Sheh Hassan Barakbah (1906–1975)	1 February 1969	1 February 1975	6 years, 0 days
4		Tun Dato' Seri Utama; Sardon Jubir (1917–1985)	2 February 1975	30 April 1981	6 years, 88 days
5		Tun Dato' Seri Utama; Awang Hassan (1910–1998)	1 May 1981	30 April 1989	8 years, 0 days
6		Tun Dato' Seri Utama; Hamdan Sheikh Tahir (1921–2005)	1 May 1989	30 April 2001	12 years, 0 days
7		Tun Dato' Seri Utama Haji; Abdul Rahman Abbas (b. 1938)	1 May 2001	30 April 2021	20 years, 0 days
8		Tun Dato' Seri Utama; Ahmad Fuzi Abdul Razak (b. 1949)	1 May 2021	30 April 2025	4 years, 0 days
9		Tun Dato' Seri Utama; Ramli Ngah Talib (b. 1941)	1 May 2025	Incumbent	1 year, 165 days

== See also ==
- Factory Records: Straits Settlements IOR/G/34 1786–1830
