= Richard Pearson (police officer) =

British Army officer and senior police officer

Lieutenant-Colonel Richard Pearson CB JP
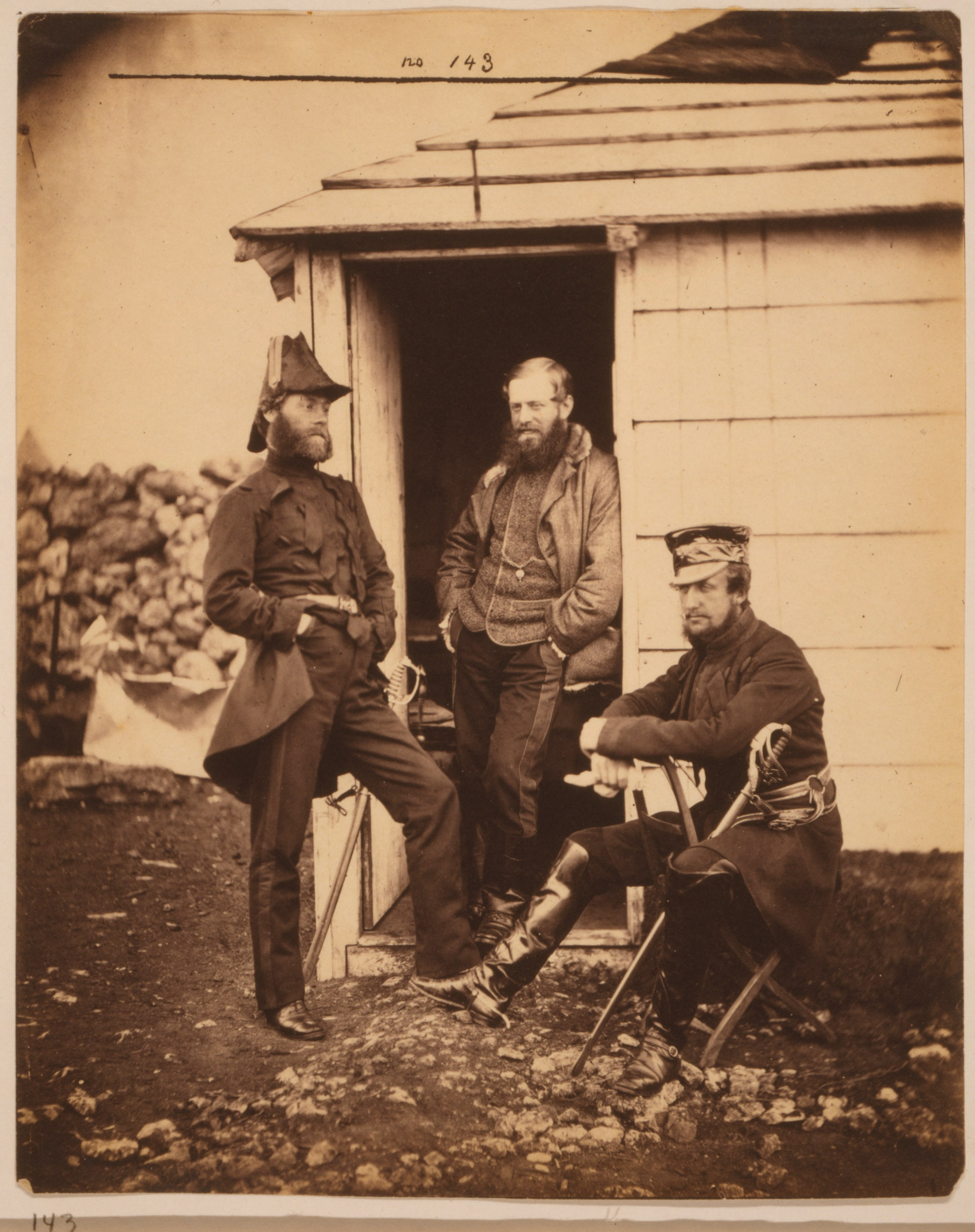
- Captains Ponsonby, Pearson, and Markham, on the staff of Sir George Brown, in the Crimea in 1855
- Born: 1831
- Died: 18 May 1890 (aged 58–59)
- Relatives: Henry Shepherd Pearson, Governor of Penang (father); John Lyons of Antigua (grandfather); Edmund Lyons, 1st Baron Lyons (uncle); Richard Lyons, 1st Viscount Lyons (first cousin); Sir Algernon Lyons, Admiral of the Fleet (first cousin)
- Military career
- Allegiance: United Kingdom
- Branch: Grenadier Guards
- Rank: Lieutenant-Colonel (British Army)
- Conflicts: Crimean War

Lieutenant-Colonel Richard Lyons Otway Pearson CB JP (1831–30 May 1890) was Assistant Commissioner (Executive) of the London Metropolitan Police from 1881 to 1890.

Pearson was the son of Henry Shepherd Pearson and Caroline Lyons, daughter of John Lyons of Antigua and sister of Edmund Lyons, 1st Baron Lyons.

He was educated at Eton College and the Royal Military College, Sandhurst. He was commissioned into the Grenadier Guards. During the Crimean War (1854–1855), he served as aide-de-camp to General Sir George Brown, and was present at Alma, Inkerman and Sebastopol.

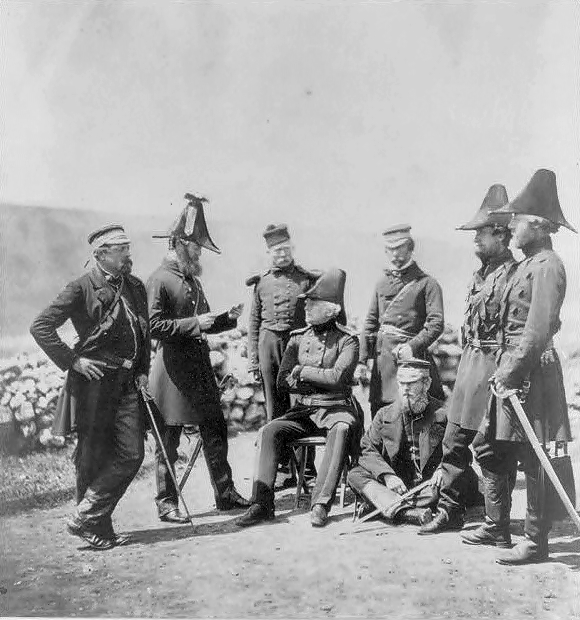
Lieutenant-General Sir George Brown and his staff in the Crimea in 1855. Pearson, Brown's aide-de-camp, is seated on the floor.

In 1856, Pearson married Laura Elizabeth Frederica Markham, great-granddaughter of William Markham. They had two sons: Charles Lyons Markham Pearson and Richard Frederick Sydney Pearson.

Pearson retired from the army in 1864 with the rank of lieutenant-colonel. In 1881 he was appointed Assistant Commissioner of the Metropolitan Police. In June 1887, he was made a Companion of the Order of the Bath (CB). He was also a Justice of the Peace for Middlesex.

He died after a prolonged illness while still serving in the Metropolitan Police.

== See also ==
- Lyons family

== Sources ==
- "Pearson, Richard Lyons Otway (1831 - 1890), Lieutenant-Colonel and Metropolitan Police Commissioner". The National Archives of the UK.
- "Pearson, Henry Shepherd (1775-1840): Profile and Legacies Summary". University College London.
- Langford Vere, Oliver. History of the Island of Antigua, Vol. 2. Mitchell and Hughes, London, 1894. pp. 213–223.
- Atkinson, George (1801). The Worthies of Westmorland. p. 269.

Police appointments
Preceded by William C. Harris	Assistant Commissioner (Executive), Metropolitan Police; 1881–1890	Succeeded by Charles Howard
