= John James Erskine =

British colonial administrator

- Born: 1771; Muthill, Perthshire, Scotland
- Died: 1833 (aged 62)
- Resting place: Muthill Church, Perthshire, Scotland
- Occupation: Colonial administrator
- Employer: East India Company
- Spouse: Isabella Boyd
- Parent(s): Reverend William Erskine and Helen Drummond

John James Erskine (1771-1833) was a British colonial administrator who served as a member of the governing council of Prince of Wales Island (Penang), Malaysia (1810-1826) and worked for the East India Company.

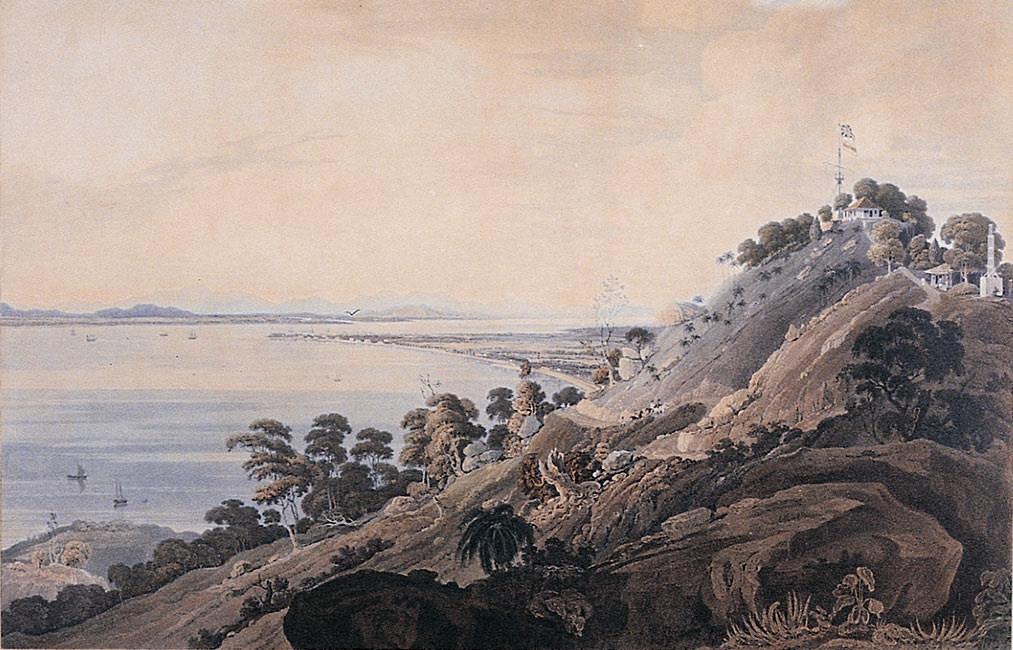
Mount Erskine in 1818, named after John James Erskine, colonial administrator in Penang.

== Early life ==
John James Erskine was born in Muthill, Perthshire, Scotland, second son of Reverend William Erskine, Episcopalian Minister and Helen Drummond. He joined the East India Company in London as a merchant sailing on East Indiamen between Europe and Asia as Mate.

== Career ==
At the age of 24 he was offered a job in the marine supplies section for the East India Company based on Prince of Wales Island. He arrived on 18 September 1805 with Philip Dundas, newly appointed governor and other members of the new Fourth Presidency of India, including Thomas Raffles, later founder of Singapore.

His first job was Assistant to the Superintendent and Storekeeper of Marine with an initial salary of 6,000 Spanish dollars plus 2% commission on sale of goods, and in 1811 he was appointed Warehouse Keeper.

In 1810 when governor Charles Andrew Bruce died in office there was a vacancy in the governing council and he was sworn in as Third Member in Council. Five years later he was promoted to Second Member in Council, second only to the governor. In 1819 he declined to vote in favour of governor John Alexander Bannerman's proposal to withhold support to Stamford Raffles when he requested assistance to secure Singapore for the British Crown, although Bannerman later changed his mind.

He retired on 26 July 1826 and married Isabella Boyd on 6 July 1830. He died in 1833 aged 62 and was buried in Muthill Church.

== Legacy ==
Mount Erskine, the hilly area north-west of George Town, Penang, and the street leading to it bear his name.
