= Anna (1790 ship) =

History

Great Britain
- Name: Anna
- Owner: 1790-1815:Bruce, Fawcett & Co.; 1816:Remington Crawford
- Builder: Bombay Dockyard (Mazagon)
- Launched: 21 July 1790, or 1788
- Nickname(s): Bombay Anna
- Fate: Lost 1816

General characteristics
- Type: Ship
- Tons burthen: 850, or 899 (bm)
- Propulsion: Sail
- Complement: 80
- Armament: 1797:2 × 9-pounder + 18 × 6-pounder guns 1797:20 × 9&6-pounder guns
- Notes: Teak built

Anna was launched at Bombay in 1790. She was often called Bombay Anna to distinguish her from Bengal Anna. Bombay Anna made two voyages for the British East India Company (EIC). She was lost at sea in 1816.

== Career ==
Anna first appeared in Lloyd's Register for 1797 (published in 1796), with M. Gilmore, master, changing to J. Horne, Law & Co., owner, and trade London–East Indies. The entry noted that she had been built in 1788 of teak in the East Indies.

In 1796 she carried rice from Bengal to Britain on behalf of the British government which was importing grain to address high prices for wheat in Britain following a poor harvest.

Anna was admitted to the Registry of Great Britain on 24 November 1796. The next day Captain John Horn acquired a letter of marque.

On 31 July 1797 Bengal Anna, Bombay Anna, and Coromandel arrived in Portsmouth with invalids and prisoners from the West Indies. They had made a rapid voyage of about a month. The vessels may have gone out to the West Indies in connection with Admiral Sir Hugh Cloberry Christian's expedition to the West Indies, thought they are not listed amongst the vessels that left on 24 January 1796.

On 20 November 1798 Captain James Horsburgh sailed from China, bound for England. Anna left Whampoa Anchorage on 20 November 1798 and was at Lintin on 7 February 1799. She reached Malacca on 22 February and St Helena on 8 May; she arrived at Long Reach on 17 July.

On 9 December 1799 Bengal Anna and Bombay Anna were at Madeira taking on wine. They were in company with Calcutta, which shortly thereafter was captured and recaptured. They had sailed from Spithead on 20 November. One report has her in the Red Sea as one of the many transports supporting General Baird's expedition to help General Ralph Abercromby expel the French from Egypt.

Captain James Horsburgh sailed from Bombay on 6 May 1801, bound for England. Anna reached St Helena on 26 August and arrived at The Downs 30 October.

She then made voyages to China in 1802, 1805, 1806, and 1807. On the voyage in 1804 she carried opium. From 1807 to 1808 her captain was F. Smith.

In the summer of 1810 the Royal Navy took up Anna as a transport. The navy detached Anna and Minerva, and two Calcutta ships, Oxford and Troubridge from the rest of the transports and sent the four to the Cape of Good Hope to gather reinforcements. The governor there, Lord Caledon, delayed their departure. They were armed and received a naval officer to command them. (They may thereafter have been styled briefly as HM hired armed ships.) They arrived at Mauritius too late to participate in the Invasion of Île de France in December. Lieutenant Bertie Cator was appointed to command Anna. He moved from temporary command of HMS Otter and by some accounts commanded Anna during the Invasion. He then became (acting) commander of HMS Acteon, which he sailed back to England with duplicate dispatches. (Note: In 1816 the Admiralty paid prize money for the campaign, and the Invasion. A first-class share, that of a captain or commander, was worth £153 5s 5½d. A second-class share, that of a lieutenant, was worth £29 2s 5¼d. It is not clear whether Cator qualified for a first-class share as commander of Anna, despite being a lieutenant. A sixth-class share, that of an ordinary seaman, was worth £1 18s 0¾d. In 1828 there was a fourth and final payment. A first-class share was worth £29 19s 5¼d, and a second-class share was worth £6 7s 7d. A sixth-class share was worth 8s 2½d.)

Captain Jonathon Tate commanded Anna between 1811 and 1816. She made a voyage to Mauritius in 1811.

Anna served as a transport ship during the British invasion of Java in 1811. She was part of the second division, which sailed from Malacca on 11 June 1811.

On 4 July 1812 Anna was at Prince of Wales' Island when a fire broke out on shore. She was among the many vessels, Navy and merchant, that contributed men to fight the fire.

In 1812, 1814, and 1816 Anna again sailed to China. In 1814, for instance, she carried 14,495 piculs of cotton to China.

== Fate ==
Captain Jonathon Read commanded Anna in 1816. Anna was lost at sea in 1816, or 1817.

== See also ==
- List of people who disappeared mysteriously at sea
