= Charles Howard (police officer) =

Sir Charles Howard KCB

Assistant Commissioner of Police of the Metropolis (Executive)
- In office 1890–1902

Personal details
- Born: Andrew Charles Howard; 12 September 1832 Shaldon, Devon, England
- Died: 11 June 1909 (aged 76)
- Occupation: Police officer

Sir Andrew Charles Howard KCB (12 September 1832 – 11 June 1909) was the third Assistant Commissioner (Executive) of the London Metropolitan Police, serving in the post from 1890 to 1902. He was the first career police officer to be appointed an Assistant Commissioner.

Howard was born in Shaldon, Devon. He joined the Merchant Navy and was commissioned into the East India Company's army, serving with Rattray's Sikhs throughout the Indian Mutiny. He then served with the police in Bengal. He was chief of police of Monghyr and Patna from 1864 to 1867, when he returned to England. He was one of the first four men appointed to the new rank of District Superintendent in the Metropolitan Police on 25 February 1869. (Note: On 22 October 1886 this rank was renamed chief constable.) Howard married Emily Emma Montgomery in 1871.

He was appointed to the post of Assistant Commissioner on 22 June 1890, a Companion of the Order of the Bath (CB) in 1894 and knighted in 1897. After his retirement from the post of Assistant Commissioner on 29 September 1902, he was appointed Knight Commander of the Order of the Bath (KCB) in the 1902 Birthday Honours, and was invested with the insignia by King Edward VII at Buckingham Palace on 18 December 1902. His wife died on 26 February 1929.

== Notes ==
Police appointments
Preceded by Richard Pearson	Assistant Commissioner (Executive), Metropolitan Police; 1890–1902	Succeeded by Frederick Wodehouse
