= David Gray (colonial administrator) =

British colonial administrator (1906–1976)

David Gray OBE
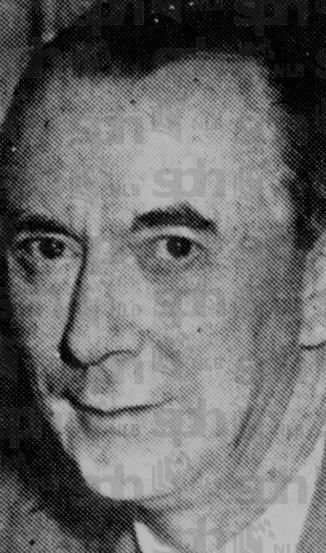
- Gray in 1953

Acting Resident Councillor of the Settlement of Penang
- In office 1954–1955
- Preceded by: Robert Porter Bingham
- Succeeded by: Robert Porter Bingham

Personal details
- Born: 2 April 1906
- Died: 1 November 1976 (aged 70)
- Children: 1
- Education: Merton College, Oxford, London School of Economics
- Occupation: Colonial administrator

David Gray (2 April 1906 – 1 November 1976) was a British colonial administrator. He served as acting Chief Secretary of the Federation of Malaya from 1953 to 1954 and acting Resident Councillor of Penang from 1954 to 1955.

== Early life and education ==
Gray was born on 2 April 1906, the eldest son of W.S.Gray of Carlisle, Cumbria. He was educated at Carlisle Grammar School; Merton College, Oxford and the London School of Economics.

== Career ==
Gray joined the Malayan Civil Service as a cadet in 1930 and served in various posts. In 1934, he was attached to the Chinese Secretariat in Singapore and in 1936 was acting Protector of Chinese in Negeri Sembilan where he organised relief work for unemployed Chinese. After he was interned by the Japanese military in Singapore from 1942 to 1945, he returned to the service after the War and in 1947 was attached to the Department of Labour of the Federation of Malaya as deputy commissioner. Between 1951 and 1953, he was Secretary for Chinese Affairs of the Federation of Malaya. He also served as a member of the Federal Legislative Council. From 1954 to 1955, he was Resident Councillor of Penang and served as the first chairman of the newly created council assembly of the settlement. In 1953, and from 1955 to 1956, he was called on to act as Chief Secretary of the Federation of Malaya, and in 1956 as Officer Administering the government of the Federation of Malaya.

After retiring from the service in 1956, Gray returned to England and was Secretary-General of the Engineering Industries Association. He then spent ten years as the Secretary of the Industrial Society (now The Work Foundation), a post he held until 1968 when his services were recognised with the award the OBE.

== Personal life and death ==
Gray married Betty Humphrey in 1938 and they had a son.

Gray died on 1 November 1976, aged 70.

== Honours ==
Gray was appointed Officer of the Order of the British Empire (OBE) in the 1968 Birthday Honours.
