= William Edward Phillips =

Governor of Penang

William Edward Phillips (1769–1858) was a British army officer and colonial administrator. He was acting governor of the Prince of Wales' Island on six occasions.

== Life ==
He was the son of General William Phillips. He went to India in 1787 as a cadet in the forces of the East India Company. In Penang in 1800, he became secretary to George Alexander William Leith, and after that to Robert Townsend Farquhar. He was then in charge of Penang until the arrival of Philip Dundas with full powers, and Phillips was at that point given a customs post.

Further sets of circumstances then saw Phillips govern Prince of Wales' Island, in an acting capacity, which he did in total six times. They included

1. From the death of newly arrived Lieutenant-Governor Charles Andrew Bruce in December 1810, until the arrival of Archibald Seton in 1811.
2. From the death of Lieutenant-governor William Petrie in 1816 until the arrival of Colonel John Alexander Bannerman in 1817.
3. From the death of Bannerman in 1819, until he was appointed Lieutenant-governor in 1820.

Phillips then served as Governor of Prince of Wales' Island from 1820, frustrating the hopes for the post of Stamford Raffles.

== Family ==
In 1818 Phillips married Janet Bannerman, daughter of Colonel John Alexander Bannerman. Their second son was the barrister Charles Palmer Phillips; and their third son was William Cornwallis Phillips of the Madras Army.

The Phillips marriage was part of a double wedding, in which Henry Burney married another Janet Bannerman. She was the daughter of the Rev. James Patrick Bannerman, brother of Colonel Bannerman.
