= Anna (1793 ship) =

British East India ship launched at Calcutta in 1793

History

Great Britain
- Name: Anna
- Owner: 1797:Farlie & Co.; 1812:Dempster
- Builder: George Foreman & Nathaniel Bacon, Calcutta
- Launched: 14 January 1793
- Nickname(s): Bengal Anna
- Fate: Lost c.1811

General characteristics
- Type: Ship
- Tons burthen: 684 (bm)
- Propulsion: Sail
- Complement: 1796:90, 1805:100
- Armament: 1796:18 × 12&6-pounder guns; 1805:14 × 9-pounder guns
- Notes: Teak built.

Anna was launched at Calcutta in 1793. She was often called Bengal Anna to distinguish her from Bombay Anna. Bengal Anna made three voyages for the British East India Company (EIC). She was lost on the coast of Chittagong c.1811, after participating in a military expedition.

== Career ==
Captain Mungo Gilmore sailed from Calcutta on 23 December and was at Saugor on 15 February 1795. Anna reached the Cape of Good Hope on 19 April and St Helena on 5 May; she arrived at Deptford on 18 August. Gilmore acquired a letter of marque on 22 December 1795. Anna was admitted to the Registry of Great Britain on 27 September 1796.

She first appears in Lloyd's List in 1797 with "Gilmour", master, and Farlie & Co., owner.

On 31 July 1797 Bengal Anna, Bombay Anna, and Coromandel arrived in Portsmouth with invalids and prisoners from the West Indies. They had made a rapid voyage of about a month. The vessels may have gone out to the West Indies in connection with Admiral Sir Hugh Cloberry Christian's expedition to the West Indies, thought they are not listed amongst the vessels that left on 24 January 1796.

Anna, Mungo Gilmore, master, arrived in England on 2 August 1799 from China. This voyage was apparently at the behest of the EIC, though it does not appear in the list of voyages maintained at the British Library. On 9 December Bengal Anna and Bombay Anna were at Madeira taking on wine. They were in company with Calcutta, which shortly thereafter was captured and recaptured. They had sailed from Spithead on 20 November.

Captain Patrick Clark sailed from Calcutta on 1 July 1800, bound for England. Anna was at Saugor on 10 October. She reached St Helena on 14 January 1801 and arrived at Long Reach on 16 April.

On 9 November 1802 Lloyd's List reported that Anna, Scott, master, had put into Île de France (Mauritius) in distress.

Captain Thomas Scott sailed from Kedgeree 28 February 1804, bound for England. She was at Saugor on 2 July, and left Bengal on 5 July in company with the country ship Mornington, and Maria, Northampton, and Princess Mary.

She reached St Helena on 29 September, and was still there on 4 October, together with Mornington. Anna arrived at Deptford on 22 December. Captain Scott acquired a letter of marque on 11 March 1805.

On 24 March 1810, Anna, Captain Thomas Scott, delivered Charles Andrew Bruce to assume the governorship of Prince of Wales Island (now called Penang). (Bruce died in office, in December).

Anna then participated as a transport vessel in the British invasion of Île de France (Mauritius), on 3 December 1810.

The British government then chartered Anna and eight other vessels as cartels to carry back to France the French troops that they had captured in these campaigns.

== Fate ==
Anna was lost on the coast of Chittagong while returning from Mauritius. She was last listed in the Register of Shipping in 1812.
