= Lucy Maria (1801 ship) =

History

United Kingdom
- Name: Lucy Maria or Lucy and Maria
- Owner: Walter Dawes
- Builder: J. Gilmore, Calcutta
- Launched: 15 January 1801
- Fate: Seized c. February 1804

Batavian Republic
- Name: Victoria
- Acquired: c. February 1804 by seizure
- Captured: 26 July 1806

United Kingdom
- Name: Troubridge or Trowbridge
- Namesake: Sir Thomas Troubridge, 1st Baronet
- Owner: Fairlie & Co.
- Acquired: 1806 by purchase of a prize
- Renamed: Lucy Maria or Lucy and Maria (c.1815)
- Fate: Broken up 1821

General characteristics
- Tons burthen: 750, or 75360/94 or 770, or 775, or 800, or 804 (bm)
- Propulsion: Sail
- Complement: 135 (Victoria)
- Armament: 18 guns (Victoria)

Lucy Maria or Lucy and Maria was launched at Calcutta in 1801. She made one voyage to England carrying rice from Bengal on behalf of the British East India Company (EIC). She was seized at Amboyna in 1804 and then sailed as the Dutch ship Victoria. The British recaptured her in 1806 and new owners renamed her Troubridge and later renamed her Lucy Maria. As Troubridge she served as a transport for two invasions, that of Mauritius in 1810 and Java in 1811. She was broken up in 1821.

== Career ==
Lucy Maria cost sicca rupees 191,000 (c.£38,200) to build. She was built of teak and her actual carrying capacity (as distinct from her registered burthen), may have been on the order of 1300 tons.

Captain Walter James, or more correctly Walter Dawes, sailed Lucy Maria from Calcutta on 7 February 1801, bound for England. She was at Saugor on 21 March and Simon's Bay on 31 July. She reached Saint Helena on 19 August and arrived at The Downs on 31 October. She was one of several vessels that delivered rice that the EIC offered for sale in December. The EIC offered the last 20 bags of rice from her in March 1802.

Lucy Maria had sailed with 86 lascars as crew. Twenty-two of these men died on the voyage, and 20 were sick on their arrival in England.

On 26 February 1802 Lucy and Maria was admitted to the Registry of Great Britain. She entered the Register of Shipping in 1802 with Dawes, master, Capt. & Co. owner, and trade London–Bengal.

=== Dutch ownership ===
Lloyd's List reported on 21 August 1804 that a French squadron under Admiral Charles-Alexandre Léon Durand Linois had captured Lucy Maria, and some other vessels, prior to 28 February as she was sailing from Bengal to China.

However, that report was in error. Lucy Maria, Dawes, master, had put into Ambonya, having lost most of her crew to sickness. The Batavian colonial authorities there took possession of her and sent her to Batavia. Captain Dawes survived for a few more days after her departure, but then died. Only three members of her crew survived. They arrived at Madras in the grab Nancy, from Tranquebar.

The frigate HMS Greyhound and brig-sloop HMS Harrier recaptured her in 1806.

The two Royal Navy vessels encountered a Dutch squadron consisting of the 36-gun escort frigate Pallas, 24-gun escort corvette William and the East Indiamen Victoria and Batavier. The British captured all but William, which escaped.

The Asiatic Annual Register... reported under the rubric "Bengal — Occurrences for October, 1806" that one of the Dutch vessels that Greyhound and Harrier had captured was Lucy Maria. The article does not specify whether she was Victoria or Batavier, but Lucy Maria better fits the size descriptions of Victoria. The article also reports that Dawes had put into Ambonya because of sickness amongst his crew, and that he too had died of the disease. Another source confirms that Victoria was Lucy Maria.

The British prizes were sold in India.

=== British ownership ===
New owners renamed Victoria. Apparently she became Troubridge, or Trowbridge. In 1810 her master appears to have been Captain Samuel Gourley, who however died in Bengal.

As Troubridge she participated in the campaign to capture Île de France (Mauritius).

In 1810 the British Government detached Bombay Anna and Minerva, and two Calcutta ships, Oxford and Troubridge, from the rest of the transports and sent the four to the Cape of Good Hope to gather reinforcements. The governor there, Lord Caledon, delayed their departure. They were armed and received a naval officer to command them. (They may thereafter have been styled briefly as HM hired armed ships.) They arrived at Mauritius too late to participate in the attack. Troubridge's naval commander may have been Lieutenant Thomas Mansel; obituaries describe him as her commander and state that he participated in the invasion. (Note: In 1816 the Admiralty paid prize money for the campaign, and the Invasion. A first-class share, that of a captain or commander, was worth £153 5s 5 1/2d. A second-class share, that of a lieutenant, was worth £29 2s 5 1/4d. It is not clear whether Mansel qualified for a first-class share as commander of Troubridge, despite being a lieutenant. A sixth-class share, that of an ordinary seaman, was worth £1 18s 0 3/4d. In 1828 there was a fourth and final payment. A first-class share was worth £29 19s 5 1/4d, and a second-class share was worth £6 7s 7d. A sixth-class share was worth 8s 2 1/2d.)

Trowbridge, Fairlie, Fergusson, and Co., owners, appeared in a list of vessels belonging to the port of Calcutta in January 1811.

Troubridge served as a transport during the British invasion of Java in 1811. She was part of the second division, which sailed from Malacca on 11 June 1811.

On 2 October 1813 there occurred a trial on Java under a British judge and before an Anglo-Dutch jury. Troubridge's third mate, a gunner, and another crewman were charged with having kidnapped a young girl at Sambas, in Borneo, and attempted to sell her as a slave at Semarang on 23 August. The jury found them "Not guilty". Troubridge's master was Captain Humphreys. On 10 October Troubridge sailed from Java for Bengal with Major General Gillespie.

By 1815 or so Troubridge had reverted to the name Lucy Maria. The East-India Register and Directory for 1819 gives the name of Lucy Maria's owner as Fairlie & Co., and her port of registry as Calcutta.

In 1816 Lucy and Maria, Captain A. Barclay, transported the 72nd Regiment of Foot from Calcutta to Mauritius and the Cape of Good Hope. This trip was mentioned in an article in the Edinburgh Literary Journal of 1830 — Quote: ❝ I avail myself of this opportunity of mentioning another instance of voracity of the shark, which came under my own observation in 1814 [actually, 1815–16], when in command of the ship Lucy and Maria, engaged by the Hon. East India Company to convey his Majesty’s 72d regiment from Calcutta to the Cape of Good Hope. On the passage, during a calm, one of the privates was sitting in a port of the lower gun-deck, eating peas-soup out of an English quart tin pot; and, by carelessness, let the pot, with a portion of the soup, fall from his hand overboard; almost immediately after this, it was intimated to me a large shark was caught by the hook; a rope was got over his body, and he was hauled on deck. As he was considered a very large one, most of the officers (sixteen in number) of the regiment, with myself, attended to examine the contents of the stomach, and, to our surprise, the tin pot entire, which the man had dropt overboard, was taken from the shark. Major-General Monckton, who commanded the regiment, was present; Captain Moses Campbell, now on the retired list, and Lieut. Gowan, on the recruiting-service, at present at Glasgow, were likewise witnesses to the circumstance.❞

Then in August 1817 Lucy and Maria delivered the 80rd Regiment of Foot to Portsmouth. Lt. Col. John Ashley Sturt, the commander of the regiment, presented Barclay with a piece of plate on behalf of the officers of the regiment as a token of appreciation for Barclay's kindness and professionalism.

Lucy Maria sailed from Portsmouth on 29 September and from the Cape on 23 December. She arrived at Madras in February 1818. She sailed for Calcutta on 13 February. She brought with her 250 ships' letters, and £130,000 sterling in hard dollars for Calcutta. Much to the disappointment of the Europeans in Madras she did not bring regular mail and new publications.

== Fate ==
The Register of Shipping for 1821 gives the name of Lucy Maria's master as Barclay, her owner as Fairlie & Co., and her trade as London–India. Lucy Maria was broken up in 1821 at Calcutta.
