= Norman Macalister =

Scottish officer in the Bengal Army and colonial administrator

Colonel Norman Macalister (20 February 1760 – August 1810) was a Scottish officer in the Bengal Army and colonial administrator who was Lieutenant-Governor of Prince of Wales Isle (Penang) from 1808 to 1810.

Macalister was born on the Isle of Skye, the eighth son of Ranald Macalister of Skerrinish and Anne Macdonald of Kingsburgh. In 1783, he joined the Bengal Army as a cadet.

The present brick structure of Fort Cornwallis in Penang, was built by convict labour in 1810 during his term as Governor of Penang. He was lost at sea, in the South China Seas, while on the ship Ocean" traveling back to Scotland. Macalister Road in George Town, Penang is named after him. In 1805, as Commander of the Artillery, Macalister made an inventory of the useful timber of Penang, part of the Company's exercise to identify potential naval timber and secure suitable woods for masts and spars to replace supplies from the lost American colonies.
