= HMS Harrier (1804) =

Brig-sloop of the Royal Navy

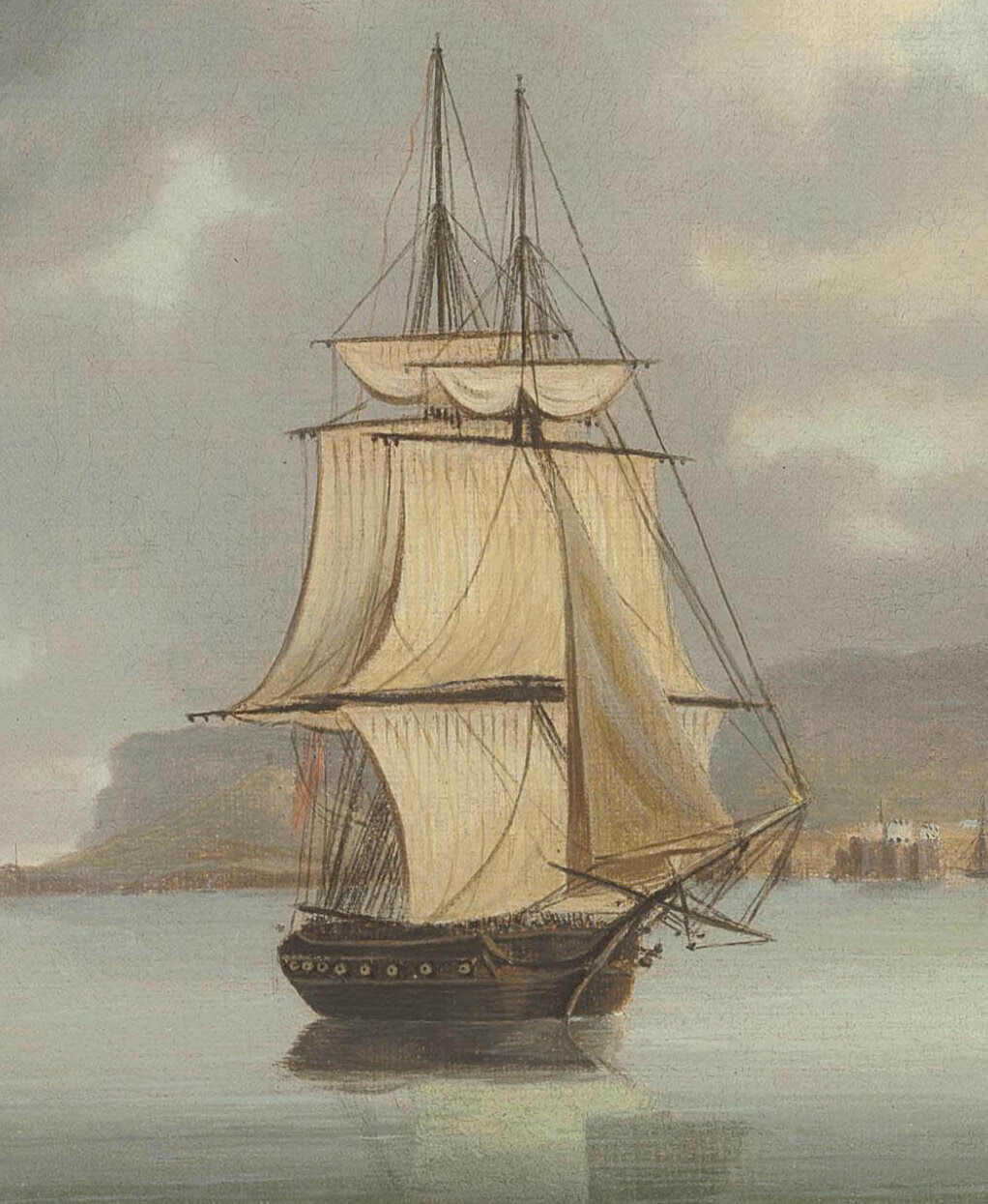
- Painting of Harrier by Thomas Buttersworth

History

United Kingdom
- Name: HMS Harrier
- Ordered: 23 May 1804
- Builder: (Mrs.) Francis Barnard & Sons, Deptford
- Laid down: June 1804
- Launched: 22 August 1804
- Fate: Lost, presumed foundered March 1809

General characteristics
- Type: Cruizer-class brig-sloop
- Tons burthen: 383 32/94 (bm)
- Length: 100 ft 0 in (30.5 m) (overall); 77 ft 3 1/8 in (23.5 m) (keel)
- Beam: 30 ft 6 1/2 in (9.3 m)
- Depth of hold: 12 ft 9 in (3.9 m)
- Sail plan: Brig
- Complement: 121
- Armament: 16 × 32-pounder carronades; 2 × 6-pounder bow guns

HMS Harrier was a Cruizer-class brig-sloop of the Royal Navy launched in 1804. She took part in several notable actions before she was lost in March 1809, having presumably foundered.

== Career ==
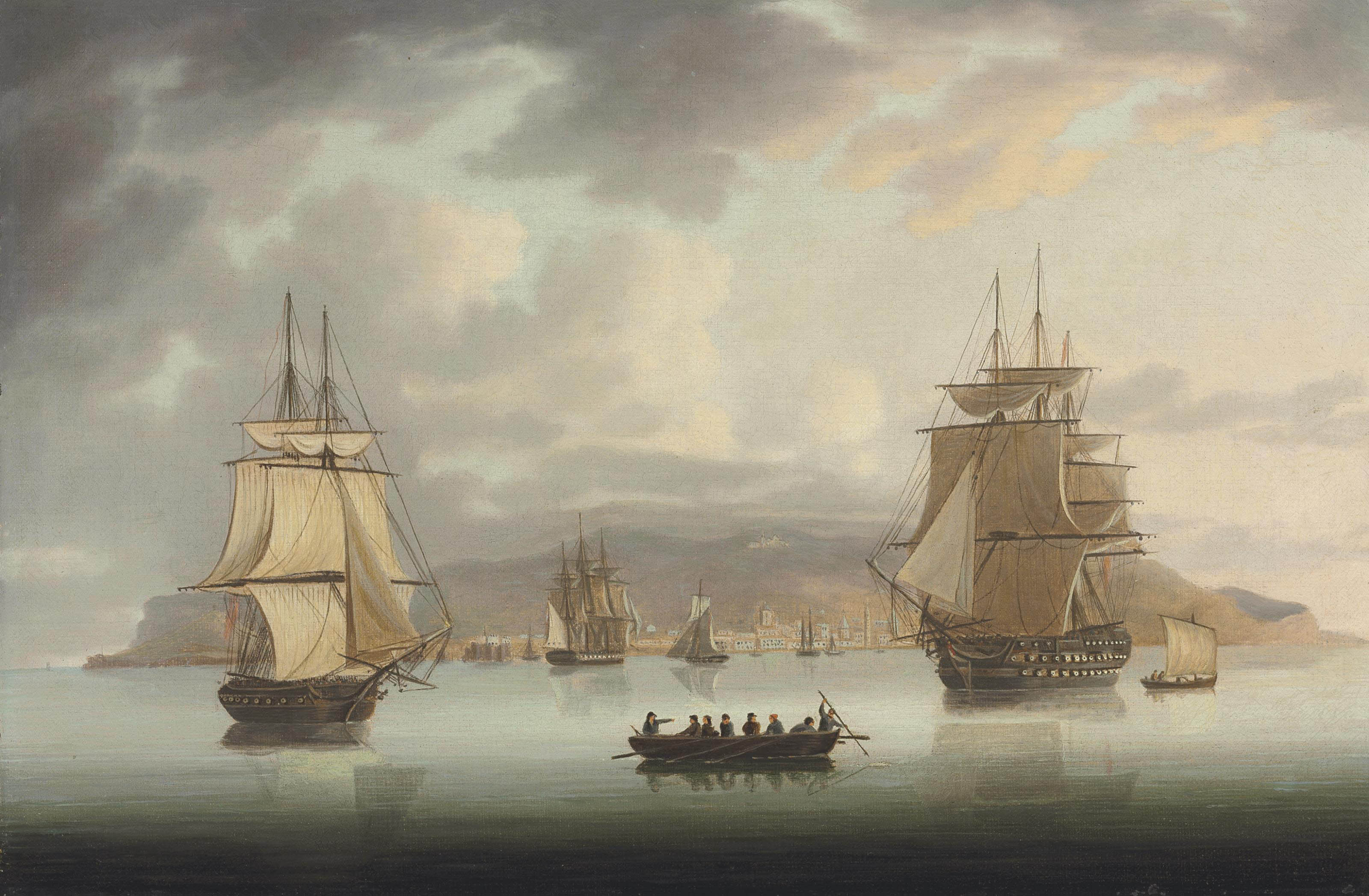
Painting of Harrier (first from left) with Blenheim and Greyhound in the Funchal roadstead in 1805

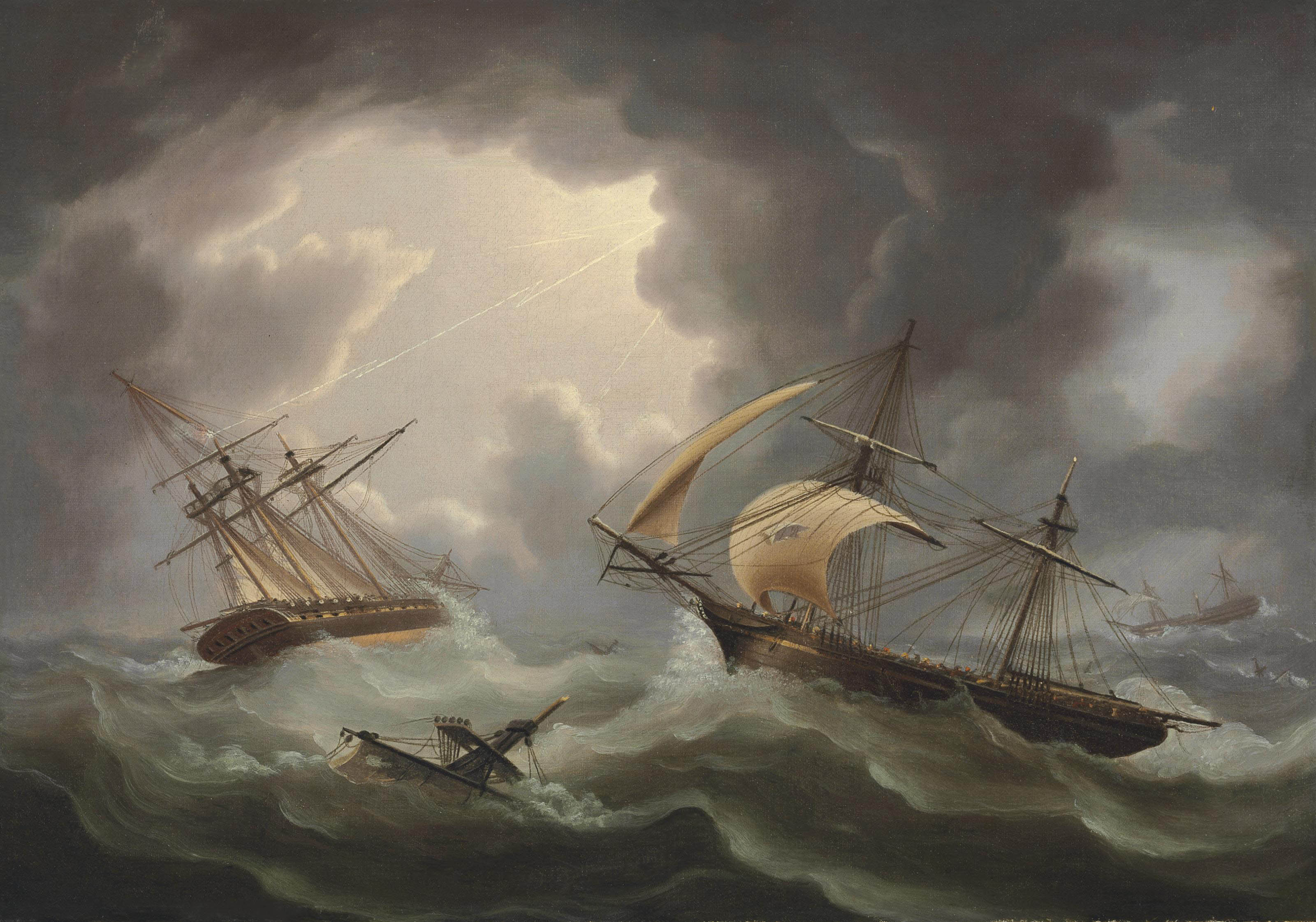
Painting of Harrier, Blenheim and Java in a hurricane off Rodriguez in February 1807

Harrier was commissioned in November 1804 under Commander William Woodridge, who sailed her for the East Indies on 24 December 1804. In 1805 Commander Edward Ratsey replaced Woodridge. On 2 August 1805, Harrier fought the 40-gun Sémillante, Captain Léonard-Bernard Motard, in the San Bernardino Strait off San Jacinto, Philippines, together with the Phaeton, under Captain John Wood. After exchanges of fire first with Harrier and then with Phaeton, Sémillante took refuge under the guns of a shore battery. Unable to dislodge her, the two British vessels eventually sailed off, each having suffered two men wounded. Sémillante was reported to have suffered 13 killed and 36 wounded. After resupplying at San Jacinto, Sémillante intended to sail for Mexico in March 1805 to fetch specie for the Philippines; the encounter with Phaeton and Harrier foiled the plan. Motard returned to the Indian Ocean, operating for the next three years against British shipping from Île de France.

In 1806 Lieutenant Edward Troubridge took command. On 4 July Harrier was in company with Greyhound, under the command of Captain Edward Elphinstone, when they captured and destroyed the Dutch East India Company’s brig Christian Elizabeth. She was armed with eight guns and carried a crew of 80 men. Christian Elizabeth was sheltering under the guns of Fort Manado. Greyhound and Harrier then sailed across the Molucca Sea to the island of Tidon in the Celebes. There, on 6 July, they captured another enemy ship, Belgica. She was armed with 12 guns and had a crew of 32 men. Greyhound and Harrier continued their cruise westward until the evening of 25 July when, in the Salayer Strait, they sighted four ships. The next morning they were able to bring the Dutch squadron to action.

After 40 minutes of an exchange of fire the Dutch frigate Pallas struck to Greyhound. Harrier engaged the two merchant vessels, Victoria and Batavier, which struck to her. The fourth Dutch vessel, the corvette William, which had not been engaged, escaped. Casualties on Pallas were heavy, with eight men killed outright and 32 wounded, including her captain and three of his lieutenants. Six of the wounded later died, including the Dutch captain. There were also four men killed on the East Indiamen and seven wounded, one of whom died later. British losses by contrast were light, with one man killed and eight wounded on Greyhound and just three wounded on Harrier.

Pallas was carrying the Mr. Robson, the chief mate of Sydney, which on 20 May 1806 had wrecked off New Guinea. Robson and a party of lascars had reached Ambonya where the governor had treated them with great kindness and hospitality, and put them on Pallas. Prize crews took the three captured ships to Port Cornwallis on South Andaman Island. Troubridge received promotion to commander in September, and assumed command of HMS Celebes, the former Pallas. Commander William Wilbrahim replaced Troubridge in Harrier.

Between 1 and 3 February 1807 Harrier endured a hurricane of Madagascar on her way to the Cape of Good Hope. She logged sightings of Blenheim and Java, neither of which was ever seen again. Blenheim was the flagship of Admiral Sir Thomas Troubridge, father of Edward Troubridge. One of the passengers on Blenheim was Elphinstone, who had been recalled to Britain. Harrier herself reached the Cape of Good Hope, but not without difficulty, and refitted there. In 1807, Commander George Pigot replaced Wilbrahim in command of Harrier. Pigot was superseded in turn by Commander Justice Finley (acting), at the Cape of Good Hope. Finley was captain of Harrier on 7 August 1807 when she captured the Helena.

Harrier, Laurel, and Grampus shared in the capture of the Jeune Laure on 5 March 1808. Commander John James Ridge was captain of Harrier on 19 October 1808 when she captured the French ship Soeuffleur. Harrier, Nereide and Leopard shared in the capture on 5 January 1809 of Goende Monche.

== Fate ==
On 13 and 14 March 1809, Harrier was in company with her sister ship Racehorse, about 1,000 nautical miles (1,900 km; 1,200 mi) from Rodrigues. Harrier fell behind and was never seen again. She was presumed to have foundered with all hands.

== See also ==
- List of people who disappeared mysteriously at sea
