= HMS Celebes =

Frigate of the Royal Navy

History

Holland
- Name: Pallas
- Builder: P. Glavimans
- Launched: 1781
- Captured: 26 July 1806

United Kingdom
- Name: HMS Makassar or Macassa, renamed to Celebes
- Acquired: 26 July 1806 by capture
- Out of service: 1807
- Fate: Sold

General characteristics (Note: All linear measurements are in Amsterdam feet (voet) of 11 Amsterdam inches (duim) (see Dutch units of measurement). The Amsterdam foot is about 8% shorter than an English foot. The data is from the Rotterdams jaarboekje.)
- Type: frigate
- Tons burthen: 850 (est.; bm)
- Length: 145 voet
- Beam: 40 voet
- Draught: 15 voet
- Propulsion: Sails
- Armament: 36 guns (nominal)

HMS Celebes was the Dutch and Batavian Republic frigate Pallas, under the command of Captain Nicolaas Sebastiaan Aalbers, that the frigate HMS Greyhound and brig-sloop HMS Harrier captured on 26 July 1806 in the East Indies.

In the battle with the British vessels, casualties on Pallas were heavy, with eight men killed outright and 32 wounded, including Aalbers and three of his lieutenants. Six of the wounded later died, including Aalbers. British losses by contrast were light, with one man killed and eight wounded on Greyhound and just three wounded on Harrier.

The British took her into service as HMS Makassar (or Macassa), but renamed her within the year to Celebes. Commander Edward Troubridge, formerly of Harrier, became her first British captain. Commander William Wilbraham succeeded him. In 1807 she came under the command of Captain William Pakenham. She was paid off at Calcutta on 23 September 1807. Following a survey, the decision was taken not to commission her into the Royal Navy. She was sold instead.
